= Uttara Padwar =

Indian charity worker

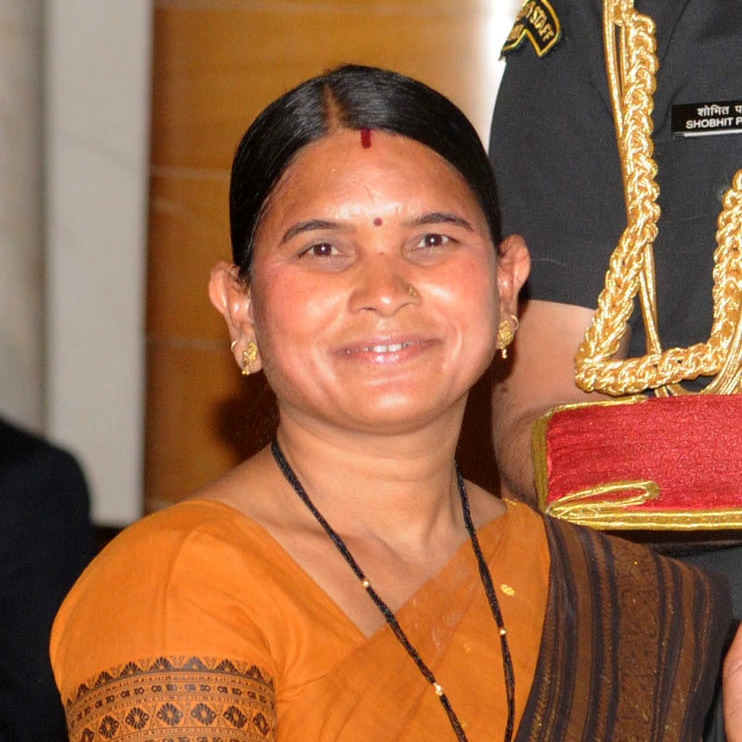
- Occupation: charity worker
- Known for: winter kits
- Awards: Nari Shakti Puraskar (2013)

Uttara Padwar is an Indian charity worker from Madhya Pradesh who was awarded the Nari Shakti Puraskar in 2013.

== Life ==
Uttara Padwar is from Madhya Pradesh where she leads a "Prayas Shiksha Samiti". This group works with Baigas, Gondi people and the Abhujhmarias. These tribal people suffer from poverty, malnutrition and disease and her group strives to alleviate it. Padwar started teaching children and her small class grew into a school which was registered with the name "Rani Durgawati School". One of the common causes of death locally is fire as people will make a mattress of dried grasses and then go to sleep beside a fire. They then die when their mattress catches alight. A related problem is cold as each winter people need to decide between warm clothing and eating. Padwar and her charity supply "winter kits". The kits consist of warm clothes, woollens and blankets and they can save families thousands of rupees each year.

Padwar was chosen to receive the Nari Shakti Puraskar/Stree Shakti Puraskar on International Women's Day in 2016. The award was made by President Pranab Mukherjee at the Presidential palace in New Delhi. Another fourteen women and seven institutions were honoured that day.

Mukherjee and the Prime Minister Narendra Modi gave speeches about the need to empower women. Mukherjee highlighted the problem of the higher number of male babies due to some parents choosing to have an abortion if their child is female.

She is profiled for her work in the media and she has been recognised with other awards.
