= Hina Shah =

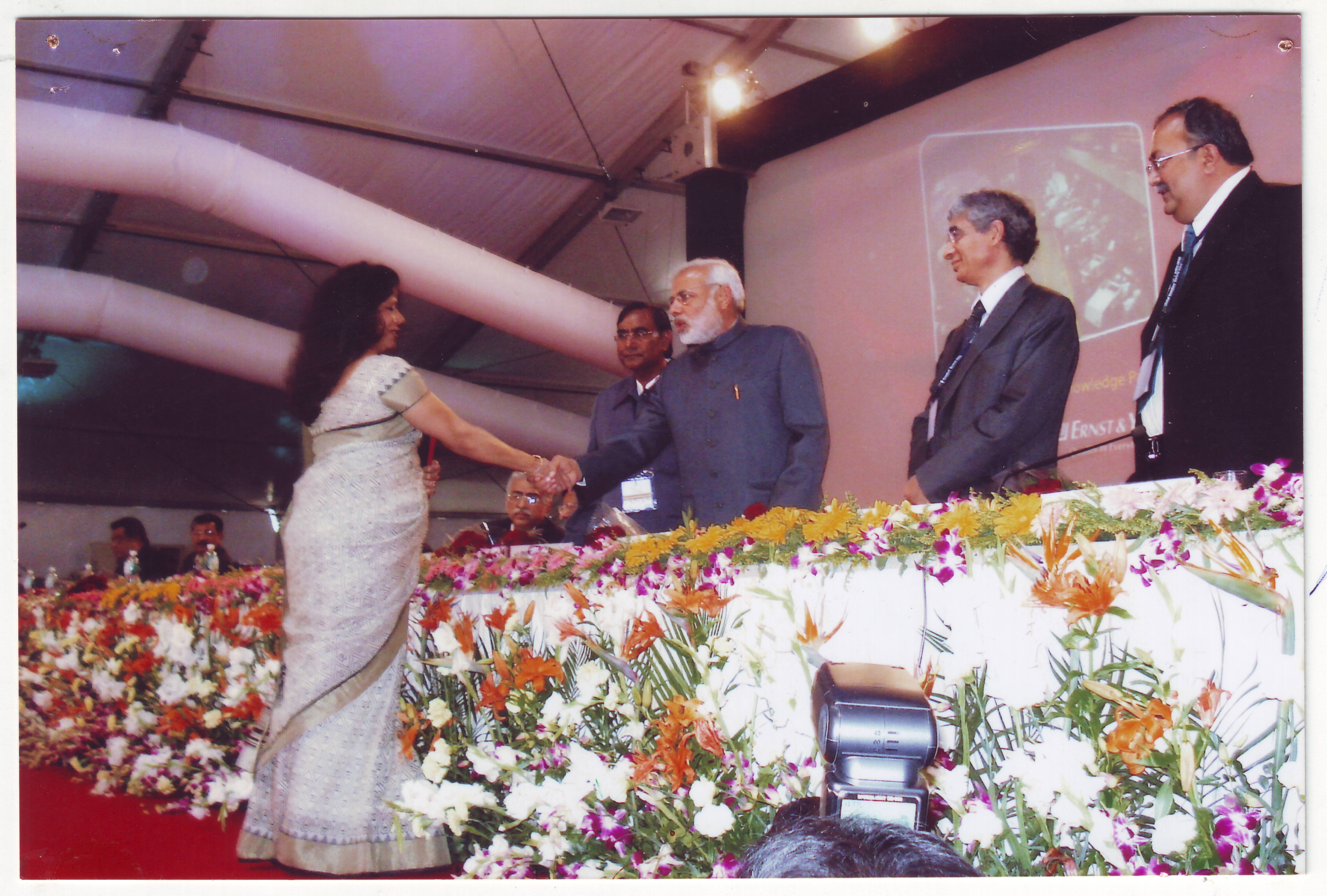
Hina Shah with Narendra Modi, CM, Gujarat

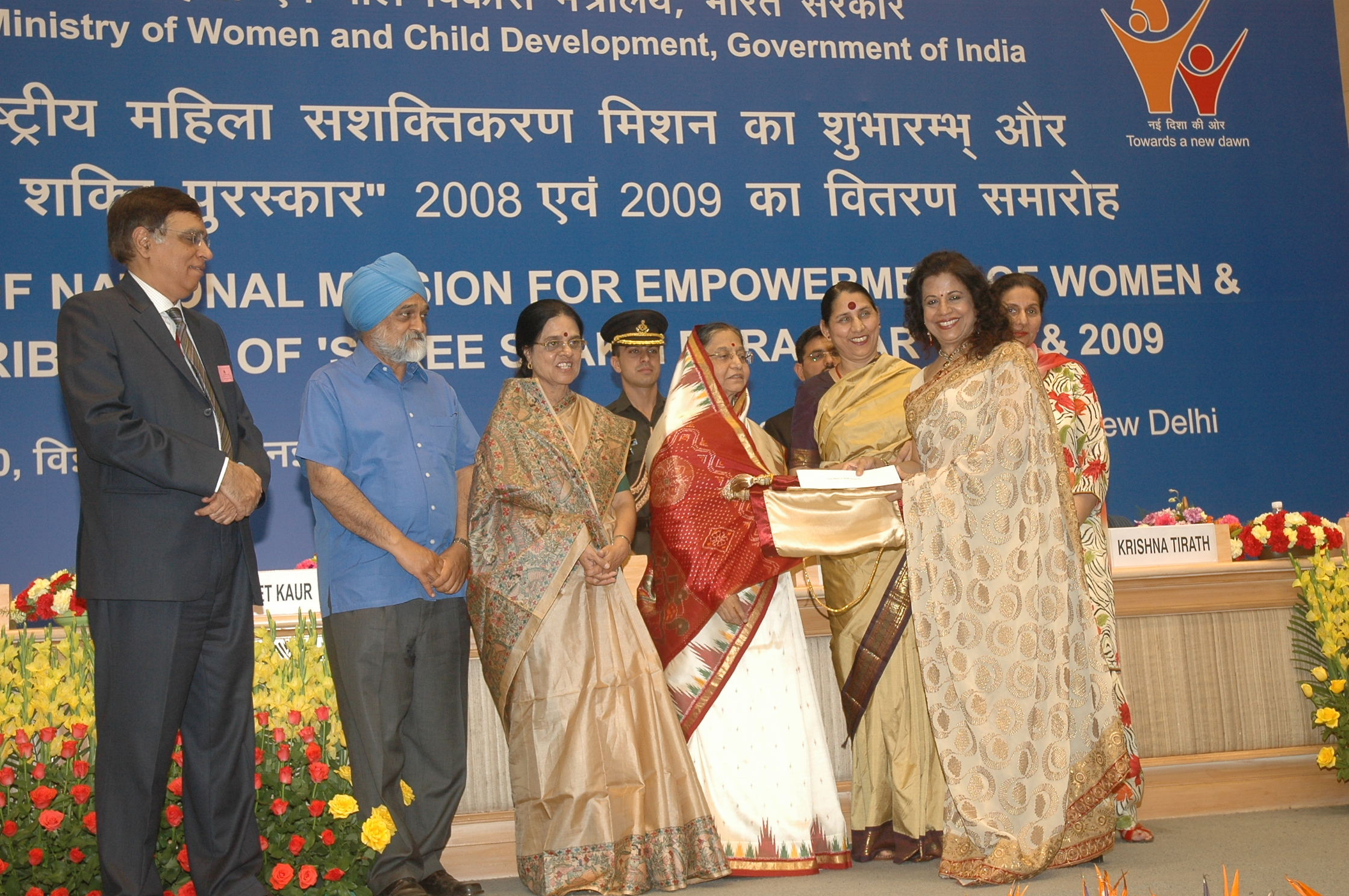
Hina Shah being awarded the Stree Shakti Puraskar by President of India, Smt. Pratibha Patil on Woman's Day

Hina Shah is an Indian entrepreneur who awards, including the Stree Shakti Award which was awarded by Pratibha Patil the President of India for her contribution in the field of economic development, the Bharat Jyoti Award, the Titan Be More Legend title, and the Best Project Award from the Project Management Institute.

== Women's empowerment ==
She began her career in 1976 in the plastic packaging industry.

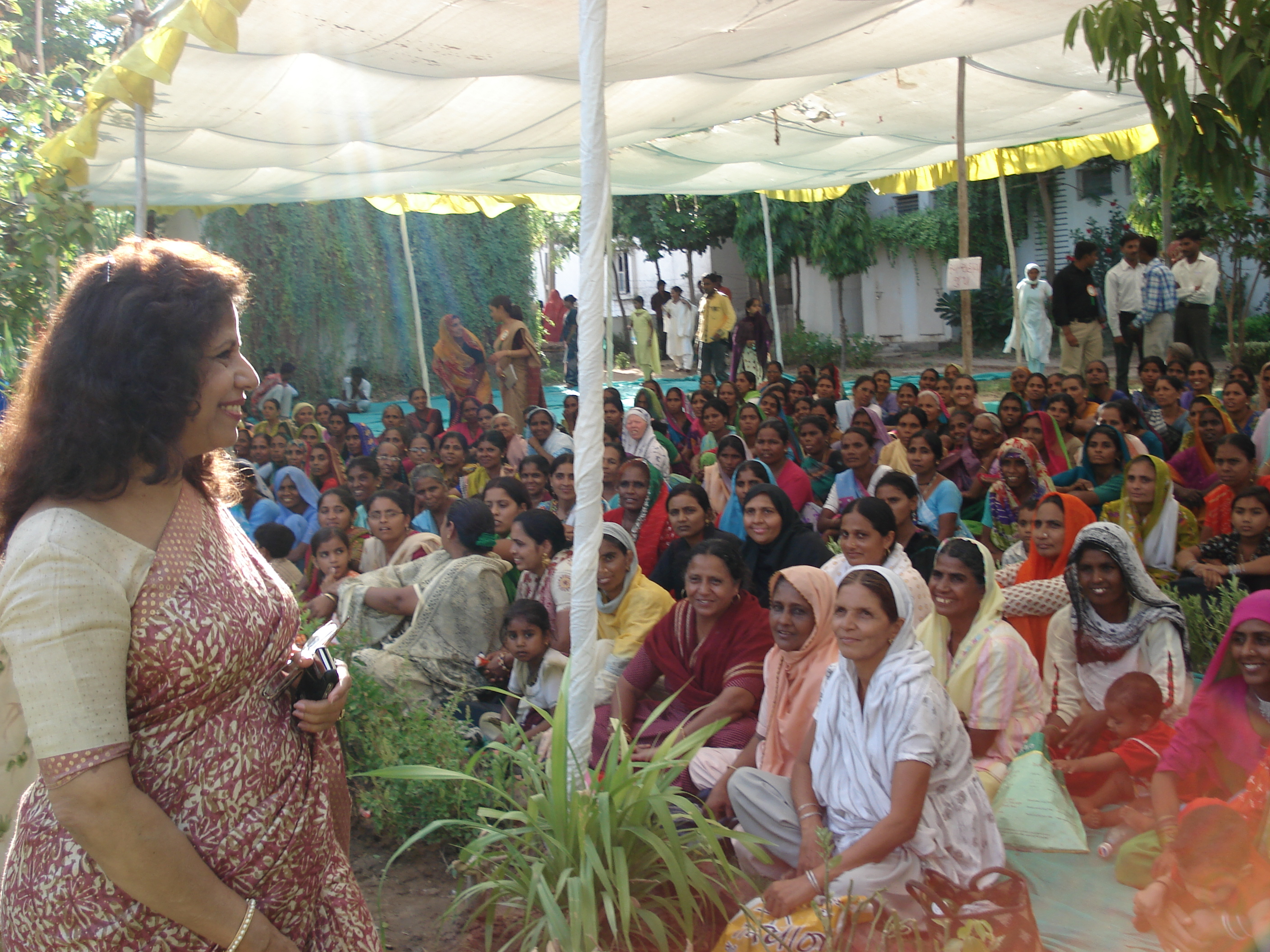
Hina Shah at a meeting with entrepreneur widows of Gujarat

In 1986, she started The International Centre for Entrepreneurship and Career Development]. Shah's "Entrepreneurship Development Programme for Women", was started with 25 women from Gujarat and 16 of them established non-traditional businesses which were still in business in 2011.

Shah was instrumental in initiating and institutionalizing women's economic empowerment strategies in Zambia, Bangladesh, Lesotho, Botswana, Cameroon, Malaysia, Philippines, Jordan, Sri Lanka, Guyana, Ivory Coast, and St. Kitts.
