= Pamela Chatterjee =

Indian writer and rural activist (born c. 1930)

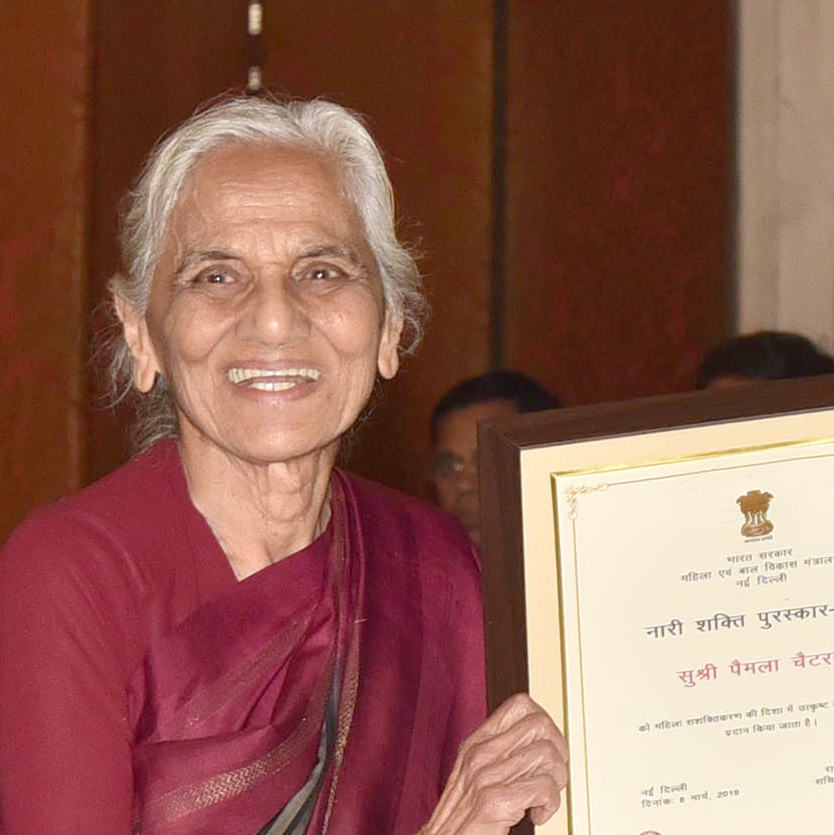
- receiving the Nari Shakti Puraskar
- Born: c. 1930
- Occupations: activist and writer

Pamela Chatterrjee (born c. 1930) is an Indian writer and rural activist. Her project reclaimed 625,000 hectares of land. She has been recognised with the Nari Shakti Puraskar award. It is the highest award for women in India.

== Life ==
Pamela Chatterrjee was born in about 1930.

Chatterjee lives in Kumaon Region in Uttaranchal State in India.

Chatterjee, supported by the World Bank, was able to reclaim 4,600 hectares of land. The project started with 95 farmers but over two years the numbers increased. The land in question had too much sodium and is known as Sodic soil. The first harvests of Paddy from the land showed a higher yield than traditional fields.

She published "Listen to the mountains: a Himalayan journal" in 2005.

Eventually there were 10,000 farmers and the land reclaimed was 625,000 hectares.

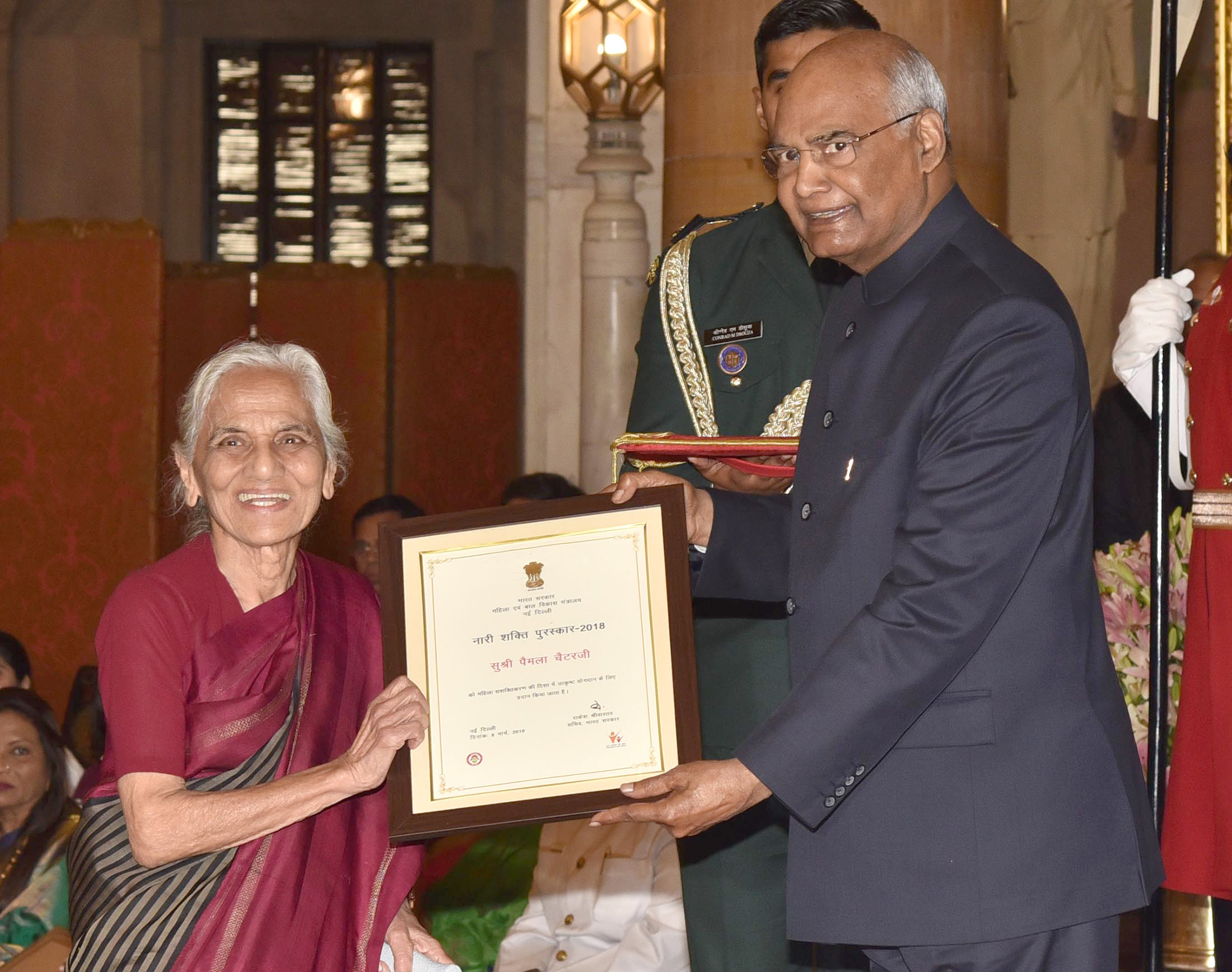
President Ram Nath Kovind presenting the Nari Shakti Puruskar to Chatterjee

She wrote up her experiences with the farm as a book titled "The Jamun Tree" which was published in 2012. It describes the project and includes recollections from those involved. The book was dedicated to the social leader Ramesh Bhai and released by Dr Ashok Khosla at the Delhi office of the World Bank.

She was given the Nari Shakti Puraskar award in 2017. The award was made in the Presidential Palace by the President of India. Prime Minister Narendra Modi was present.
