= Rhea Mazumdar Singhal =

Indian entrepreneur

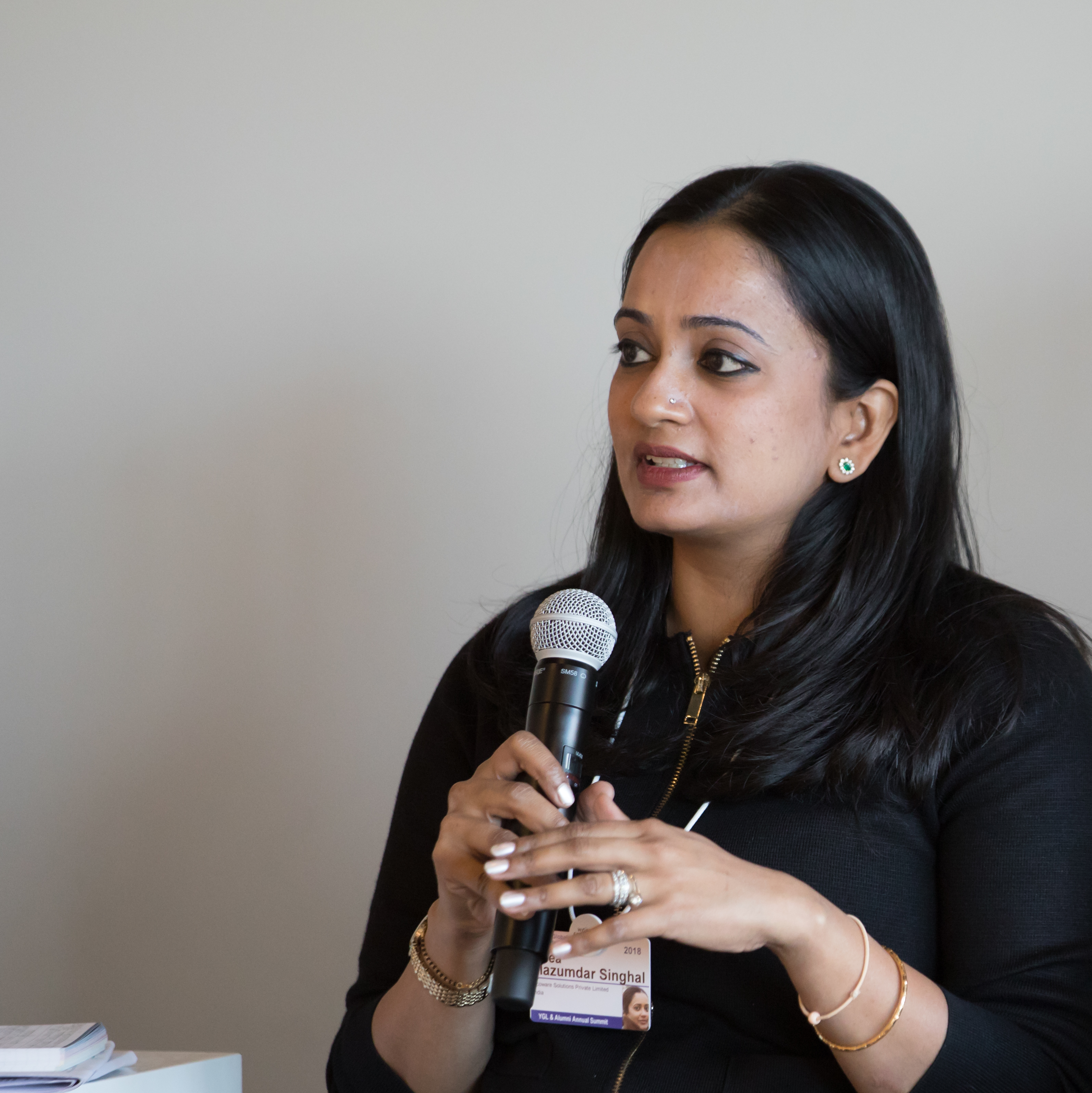
- Born: 1982 (age 43–44); Mumbai
- Education: Bristol, Oxford and Harvard Universities
- Occupations: Founder & CEO, Ecoware Solutions
- Known for: young entrepreneur with Nari Shakti Puraskar award

Rhea Mazumdar Singhal (born 1982) is an Indian entrepreneur creating biodegradable disposable products. Her awards include the Nari Shakti Puraskar.

== Life ==
Singhal was born in Mumbai in 1982. She was educated at Bristol, Oxford and Harvard Universities. She spent time in London and Dubai and returned to India in 2009. She had worked in sales for the London office of the Pfizer pharmaceutical company and she was surprised to see so much plastic being disposed of without a thought for recycling. In May 2009 she started a $1m company to create biodegradable products in India.

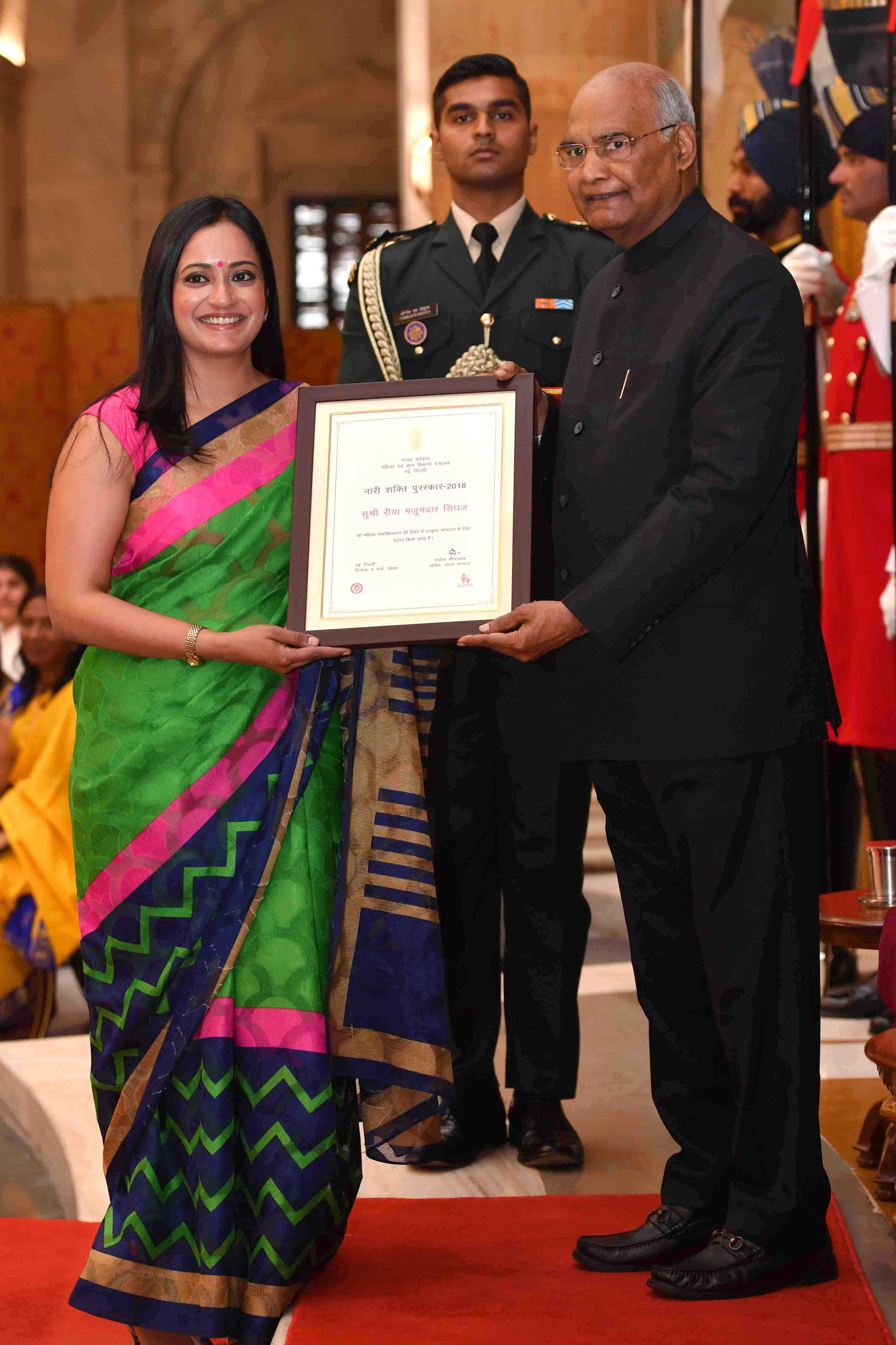
Singhal receiving the Nari Shakti Puraskar in March 2019

She retained 20 employees and she went out to market her products but she got a poor reception. Her products would biodegrade in soil in 90 days and this compared with normal plastic where the first straw every human uses is in a landfill somewhere.

Her company creates a large range of disposable items like cutlery and plates. They are made from waste from the cereal industry. One of the important customers she has gained has been Indian Railways.

In 2019 she was given the 'Woman Strength Award' (Nari Shakti Puraskar) for "pioneering the sustainable food packaging industry" in India. She was chosen from over 1,000 who were nominated. The awards were made at the Presidential Palace, the Rashtrapati Bhavan in New Delhi. She was one of over 40 women to receive the Nari Shakti Puraskar which is the highest civilian honour especially for women in India. The award was made by the President of India – Ramnath Kovind.

== Awards and honours ==
- Nari Shakti Puraskar
- World Economic Forum ‘Young Global Leader’ (YGL)
- member of the Confederation of Indian Industry's National Committee on Women Empowerment & Clean Air.
