= Draupadi Ghimiray =

Indian social activist

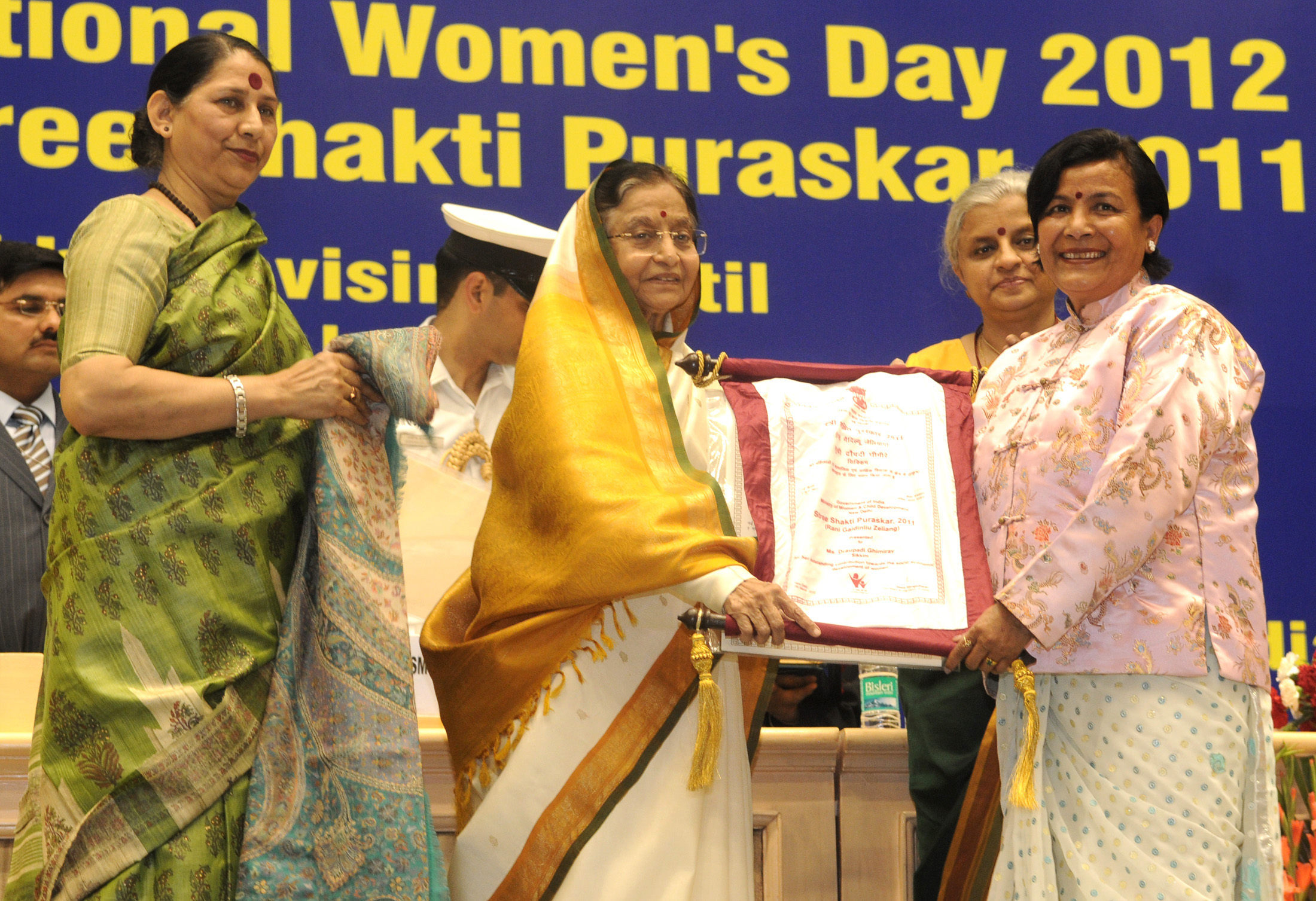
- Former president Pratibha Patil presenting the “Rani Gaidinliu Zeliang Award” to Ms. Draupadi Ghimiray (Sikkim), at the Stree Shakti Puraskar, 2011.
- Occupation: Social activist
- Known for: Contribution to education among adivasis (indigenous populations)
- Awards: Padma Shri (2019)

Draupadi Ghimiray is an Indian social activist. She was honoured with the Padma Shri, India's fourth highest civilian award in 2019.

== Notable Work ==
Ghimaray founded Sikkim Viklang Sahayata Samiti (SVSS) for the benefit of the disabled people of Sikkim.
