= Beti Zindabad Bakery =

Award winning bakery helping survivors of trafficking

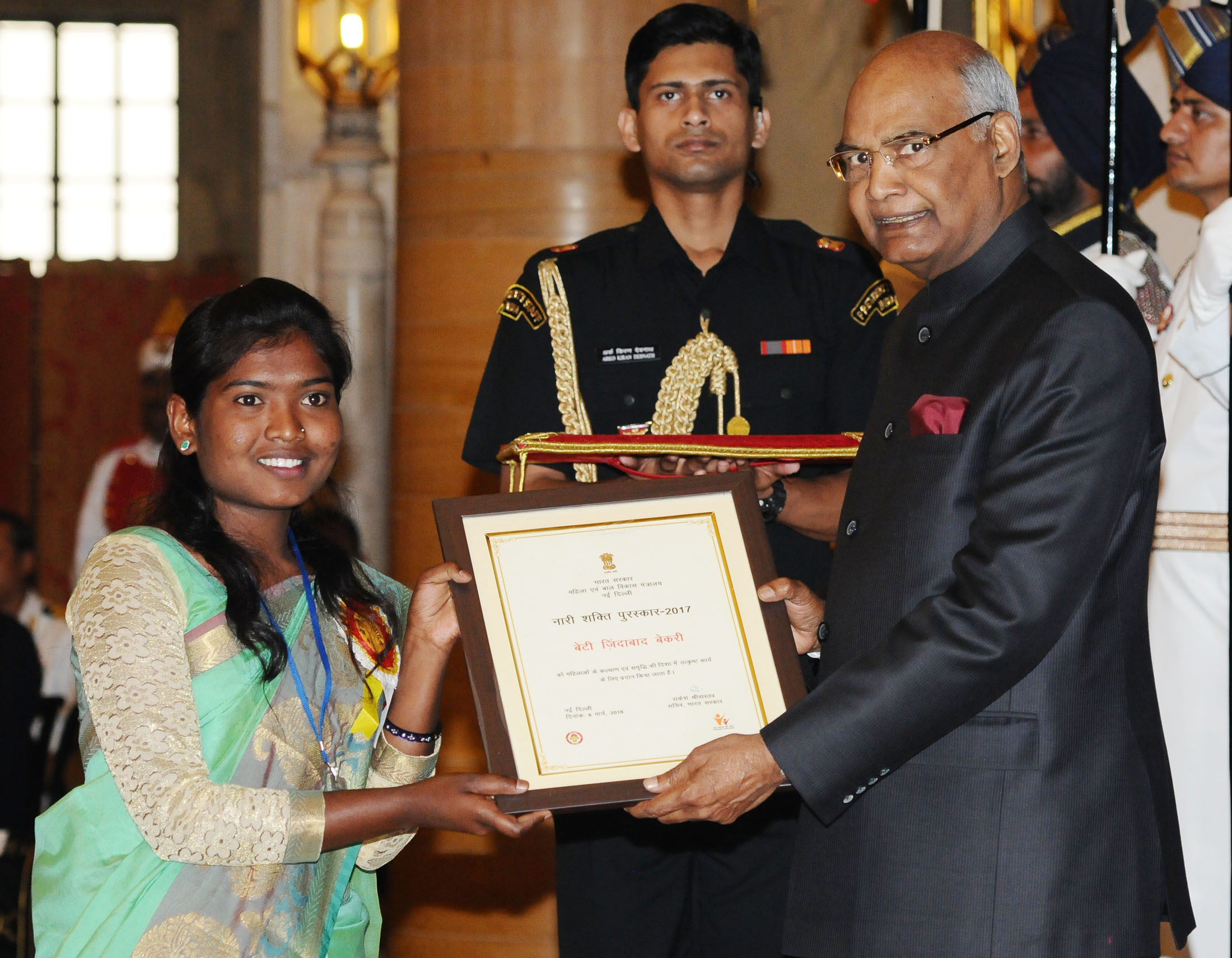
Ram Nath Kovind presenting the Nari Shakti Puruskar to Beti Zindabad Bakery, on International Women’s Day at Rashtrapati Bhavan

The Beti Zindabad Bakery was established in the Jashpur district of Chhattisgarh, India in 2017. It employs survivors of human trafficking and won the 2017 Nari Shakti Puraskar.

== History ==
The Beti Zindabad Bakery was established in the village of Kansabel in the Jashpur district of Chhattisgarh in 2017. It employs people who have survived human trafficking. Founded by a District Collector, the bakery is the only one in the village and sells cakes and cookies. The employees, women between the ages of 15 and 22, received training at the Vigyan Ashram in Pune and then opened the bakery with loans from Zilla Vyapar Udyog and the Women and Child Development Department. By 2018 the bakery was turning a daily profit and the ten employees could pay off their initial costs at Rs 8800 per month. Other costs include rent at Rs 4000 and electricity at Rs 5200 per month, respectively.

Workers from the bakery received the 2017 Nari Shakti Puraskar from the President of India, Ram Nath Kovind, in recognition of the project. The prize came with an award of Rs 100,000. The bakery is one of a number of project across India which aims to help people who would otherwise find it hard to find employment.
