= Sadhana Mahila Sangha =

Indian non-governmental organization supporting sex workers

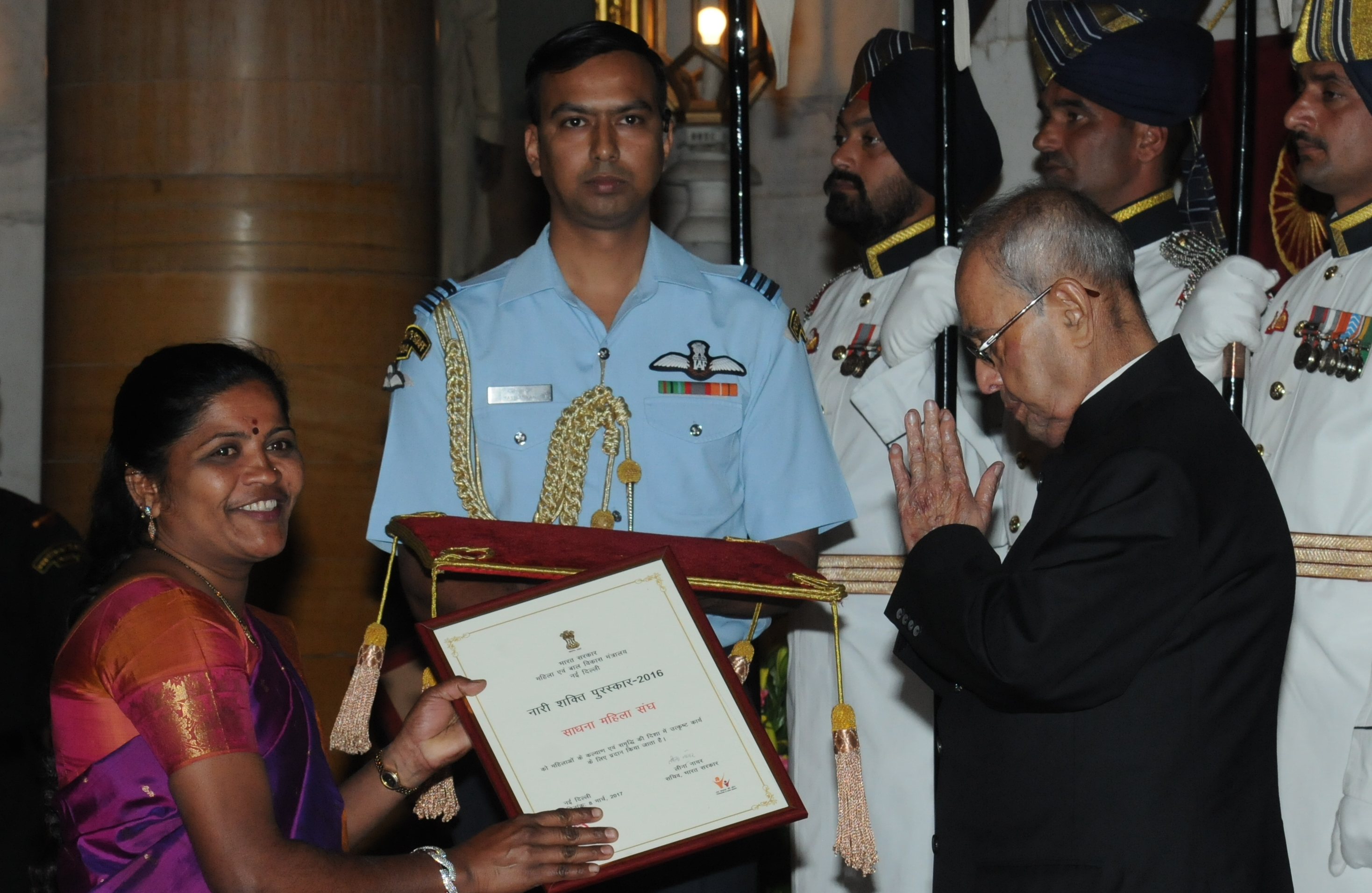
- receiving the Nari Shakti Puraskar
- Formation: 2011; 15 years ago
- Location: Bangalore, India
- Secretary General: Geetha M.
- Award: Nari Shakti Puraskar

Sadhana Mahila Sangha is an NGO in Bangalore that supports sex workers. During the Coronavirus disease 2019 pandemic they had to feed sex workers who could no longer find clients.

== History ==
The organisation was formed in 2011 and registered in 2013. Sex workers get harassed and mistreated by the police. M.Geetha, the secretary of Sadhana Mahila Sangha, says there is a 2009 ruling by the Supreme Court that specifically makes this illegal. The organisation also helps workers who intend to change their work but workers face continued discrimination. Many of them have already lost their husbands and families and even in normal times they face psychological problems on top of risks like HIV. The NGO arranges HIV testing for the sex workers every three months and then gives them counselling if they test positive. They advise them to use condoms and make sure they realise the moral issues of not doing so. Some use the positive test as an opportunity to leave sex work and others find themselves homeless after they were thrown out of their households. In both cases the NGO offers support to these women.

== Coronavirus pandemic ==
By March 2020 sex workers were reporting hardships. Many of them live outside the city and they would travel in each morning to work. During the pandemic the buses were cancelled, the clients were afraid of catching the virus and the sex workers were short of food as they relied on their clients to buy them a meal. The organisation estimated that there were 1,000 sex workers in Bangalore. Their incomes had fallen by about 55%. If a sex worker can find two clients a day then they could eat two meals but too many customers are keeping their distance. Without cash they cannot pay for their rented houses in the suburbs and because they value their privacy they will find it tricky to explain to their landlords why they cannot pay the rent. Sadhana Mahila Sangha has been providing food for those who are unemployed. By May 2020 most had not worked in four weeks. One worker noted that with HIV they could use a condom but with COVID-19 they cannot wear a complete cover all outfit.

== Awards ==
The whole organisation was honoured when it was awarded the Nari Shakti Puraskar for their work. The award was made in New Delhi and the group received a citation and one lakh of rupees. They received one of 31 awards that were made by President Pranab Mukherjee on International Women's Day, 2017, at the Presidential palace (Rashtrapati Bhavan).
