= Ela Lodh =

Indian obstetrician and gynaecologist (died 2021)

Ela Lodh (born 29th Nov 1942 - died 19 July 2021 at 79) was an eminent Indian obstetrician and gynaecologist. She received the 2020 Nari Shakti Puraskar posthumously on 8 March 2022.

== Career ==
Ela Lodh was born in Khowai in the Indian state of Tripura. Qualified as an obstetrician and gynaecologist, she worked for the Tripura Health Service, eventually becoming the Director of Tripura Health Services. She held the post from 1990 until 2000 and was also the founder of the Hepatitis Foundation of Tripura. She died of cardiac arrest in a private hospital in Kolkata on 19 July 2021.

== Awards and recognition ==
Ela Lodh received the 2020 Nari Shakti Puraskar posthumously on 8 March 2022. Her son Debanjan Lodh received the award on her behalf from President Ramnath Kovind.
