= Twinkle Kalia =

Indian woman (born 1982)

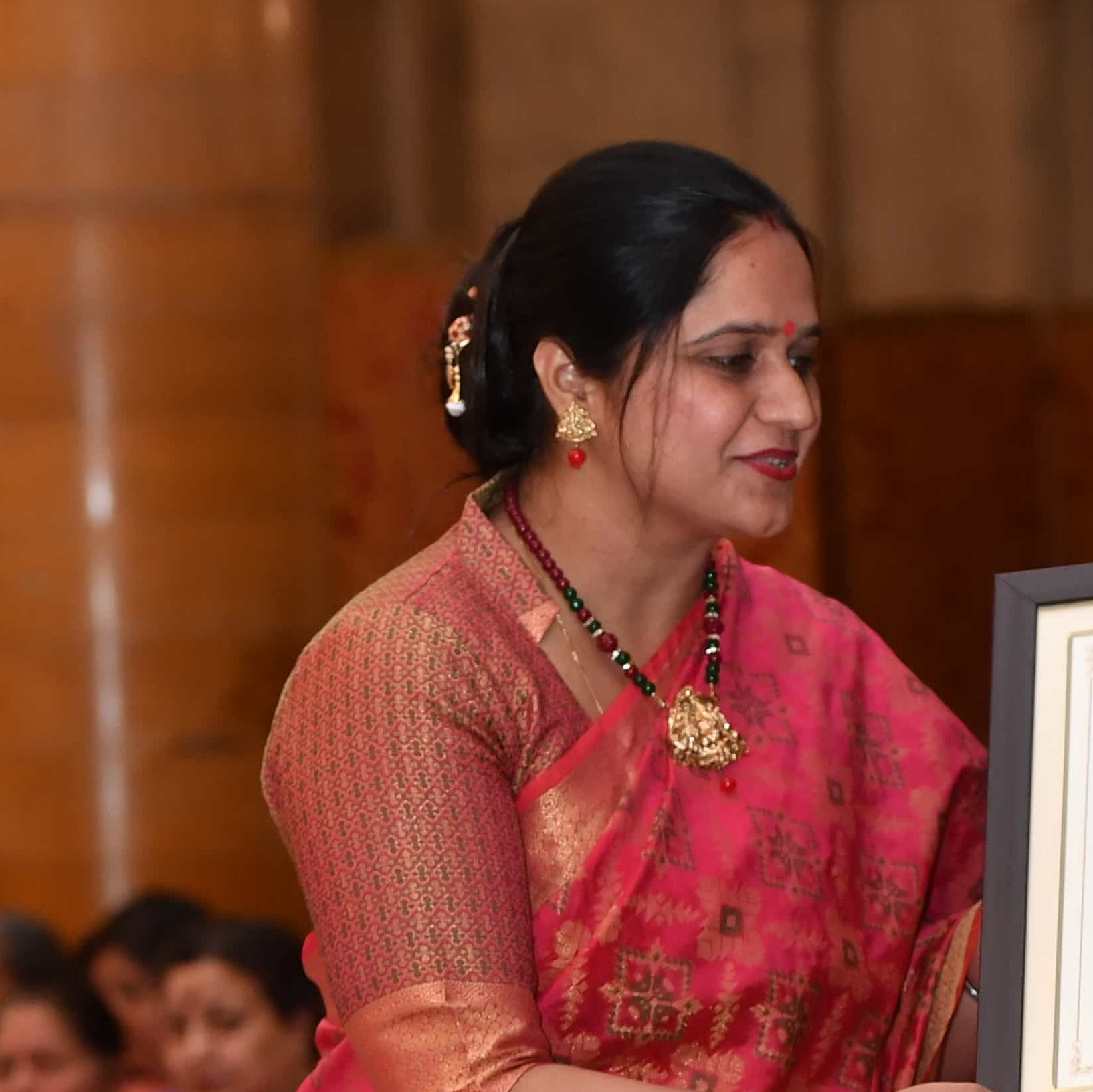
- Born: 1982 (age 43–44)
- Occupation: selling insurance
- Known for: running a free ambulance service
- Spouse: Himangshu Kalia

Twinkle Kalia (born 1982) is an Indian woman who lives in Delhi. She funds and drives ambulances. She was given the highest award for women, the Nari Shakti Puraskar, in 2018.

== Life ==
Kalia was born in 1980. When she came to marry her fiancé in 2002 he said that he did not want a dowry, but he did drive a rented ambulance and he would like to have his own. His driving force was that he had to go to work at 14 because his father went into a coma for six years. A coma he might not have had if the family hadn't wasted hours trying to find an ambulance.

Kalia's moment was when she had liver cancer and realised the value of ambulances and care. She and her husband both sell insurance for a living but they have put all their spare cash into buying and operating ambulances. Kalia has also suffered from jaundice which she believes was caused by uncovered drains. She complained but nothing happened and she realised that the only way was to become a politician. Kalia stood for the local council in 2017.

She was given the Nari Shakti Puraskar award in 2019. The "2018" award was made in the Presidential Palace by the President of India. Prime Minister Narendra Modi was present.

In 2019, they had operations in other cities too and she and Himangshu Kalia met Mamata Banerjee and mayor Firhad Hakim to discuss setting up another of their groups of ambulances in Kolkata.
