= Seema Sakhare =

Indian feminist

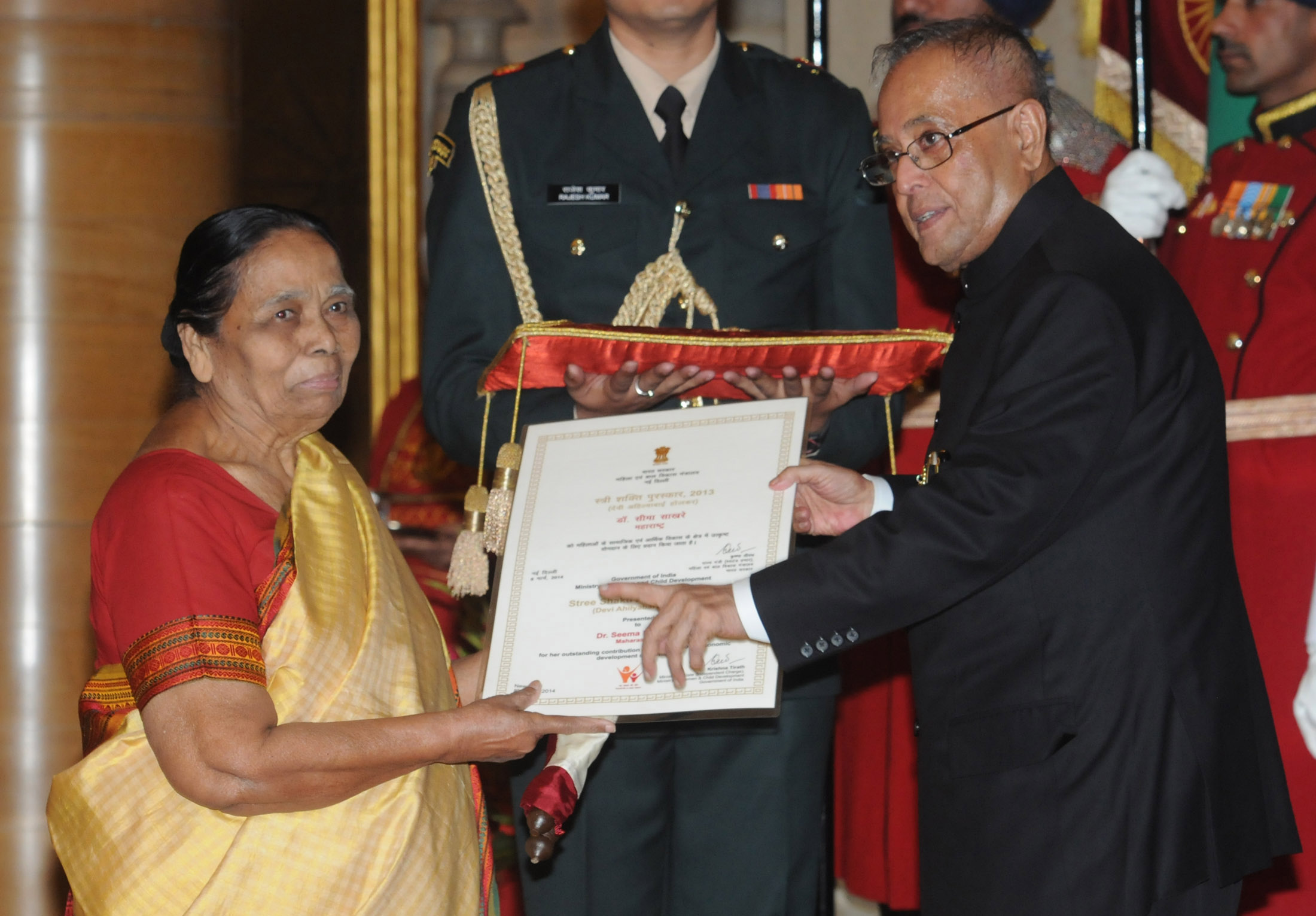
Sakhare receives the Stree Shakti Puraskar 2013

Seema Sakhare (born c. 1933) is an Indian feminist who campaigns to stop violence against women.

== Career ==
Seema Sakhare (born c. 1933) is from Nagpur in the Indian state of Maharashtra. After a young Adivasi woman from Desaiganj was raped in 1972 and the ensuing court case became a national issue, Sakhare visited her and later founded an organization which campaigned to stop violence against women. She became well-known in India for supporting women and offering legal support. In 2016, she told The Times of India that she had helped around 200 survivors of rape. When Nationalist Congress Party leader Asha Mirje made remarks suggesting that women were partly to blame for being raped, Sakhare condemned the comments and called for her resignation.

In recognition of her work, she was awarded the 2013 Stree Shakti Puraskar (now re-named Nari Shakti Puraskar).
