= P. Kausalya =

Indian HIV activist

P Kausalya
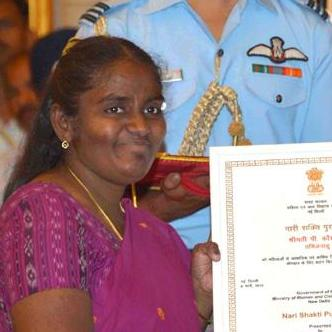
- Born: c. 1975
- Employer: Advocate for Positive Women Network
- Known for: First Indian woman to admit to being HIV positive
- Spouse: Died
- Awards: Nari Shakti Puraskar

P Kausalya, aka Periasamy Kousalya (born c. 1975) is an Indian HIV activist. She came to notice as the first woman to talk to the media about being one of India's HIV-positive people. She was awarded the Nari Shakti Puraskar in 2015 by the Indian government. She was one of four people who started the Positive Women Network to champion the rights of women who were HIV+.

== Life ==
She was born in about 1975 and when she was twenty she married her first cousin. She had been brought up by her father and his wife as her mother had died when she was two. She didn't get on with her step mother and she was assured that her mother before she died had wanted her to marry her cousin. Two weeks after the wedding she felt ill and investigations revealed that she was HIV positive. She had contracted the infection from her husband and they were both soon taking what was said to be "cures". Information was not available, she says that a doctor told her to have her uterus removed. Her husband, a lorry driver, had known he was HIV positive before the marriage. They separated and he tried, unsuccessfully to marry again. He killed himself and the media began taking interest in her story. They encouraged her to speak out and she made the brave decision that made her the first woman in India to identify herself as being HIV positive.

She was confused and scared and it was the news of Dr Suniti Solomon's work that allowed her to get her life back in order. She continued to talk to the press but she would not allow her photo to be published. She and her family were worried by stories of HIV people being killed in India. After her housemates found out about her status then they shunned her. In 1999 she became very ill with Tuberculosis and Meningitis. Drugs that would later cost 300 rupees then cost 7,500 rupees. Subsidised drugs would not be available for another five years. Luckily her uncle agreed to pay for her medicines.

As one of the few HIV positive people willing to talk to the media she became involved in discussing discrimination and the marriage of HIV positive people to "innocent" partners.

She was one of the founders of Positive Women Network with Varalakshmi, Jones and Hema. They created pressure on government organisations to supply information on HIV. They have used India's commitment to the Millennium Development Goals to persuade the government to supply homes to destitute women and to argue for special treatment for widows who are HIV positive.

When ARV drugs were introduced as part of the Management of HIV/AIDS then the PWN arranged for one of their volunteers to monitor the delivery of treatment inside hospitals to improve the behaviour of staff.

On International Women's Day in 2015 she received the Nari Shakti Puraskar. She was one of the first eight Nari Shakti Awards for her leadership and achievement the year before. The award was made on International Women's Day from the then Indian President Pranab Mukherjee.

In 2020 she was President of the PWN and still arguing to resist discrimination against people who are HIV positive. She sells red ribbons to wear of World AIDS day for twenty rupees. She notes that the money is important, but so is wearing the ribbons as it shows that people support the cause.
