= Janki Vasant =

Indian activist

Janki Vasant (born c. 1965) is an Indian activist. She received the 2016 Nari Shakti Puraskar.

== Career ==
Janki Vasant was born c. 1965. She was on board Pan Am Flight 73 when it was hijacked in 1986. She established the NGO Samvedana in 2003 aiming to help children living in slums to gain access to education and health services. Vasant began to work with inhabitants of slums in Ahmedabad and set up a school for 250 children which as well as education provided vaccinations, food and workshops. She received the 2016 Nari Shakti Puraskar in recognition of her achievements.
