= Shobha Gasti =

Indian activist

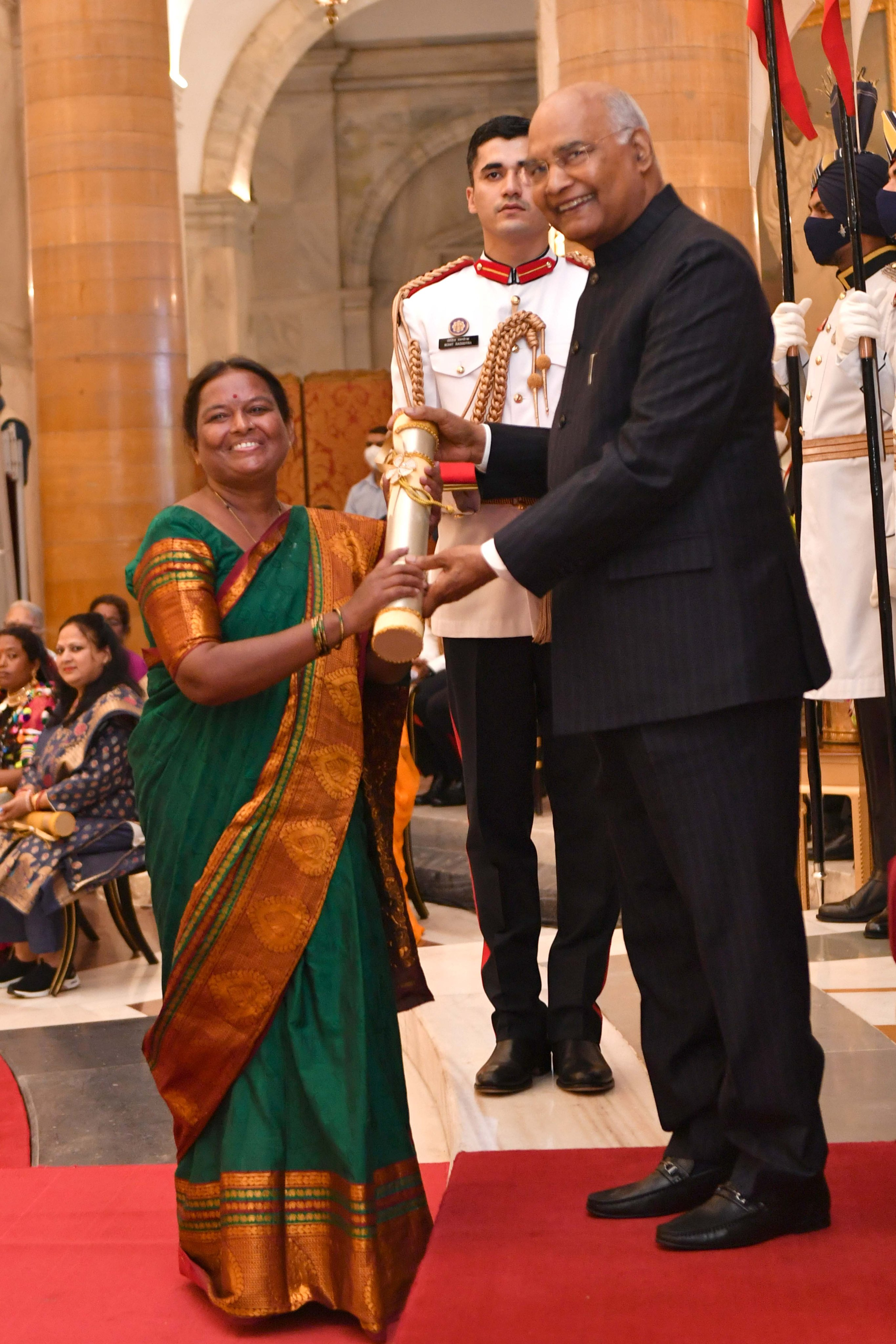
Gasti receives the Nari Shakti Puraskar from Ram Nath Kovind, March 2022

Shobha Gasti is an Indian activist based in Belgaum in the Indian state of Karnataka. Gasti also promotes children's rights, working with groups such as Child Rights and You (CRY).

In recognition of her work, Gasti was given the 2021 Nari Shakti Puraskar by President Ram Nath Kovind in 2022.
