= C. K. Durga =

Indian surgeon and oncologist

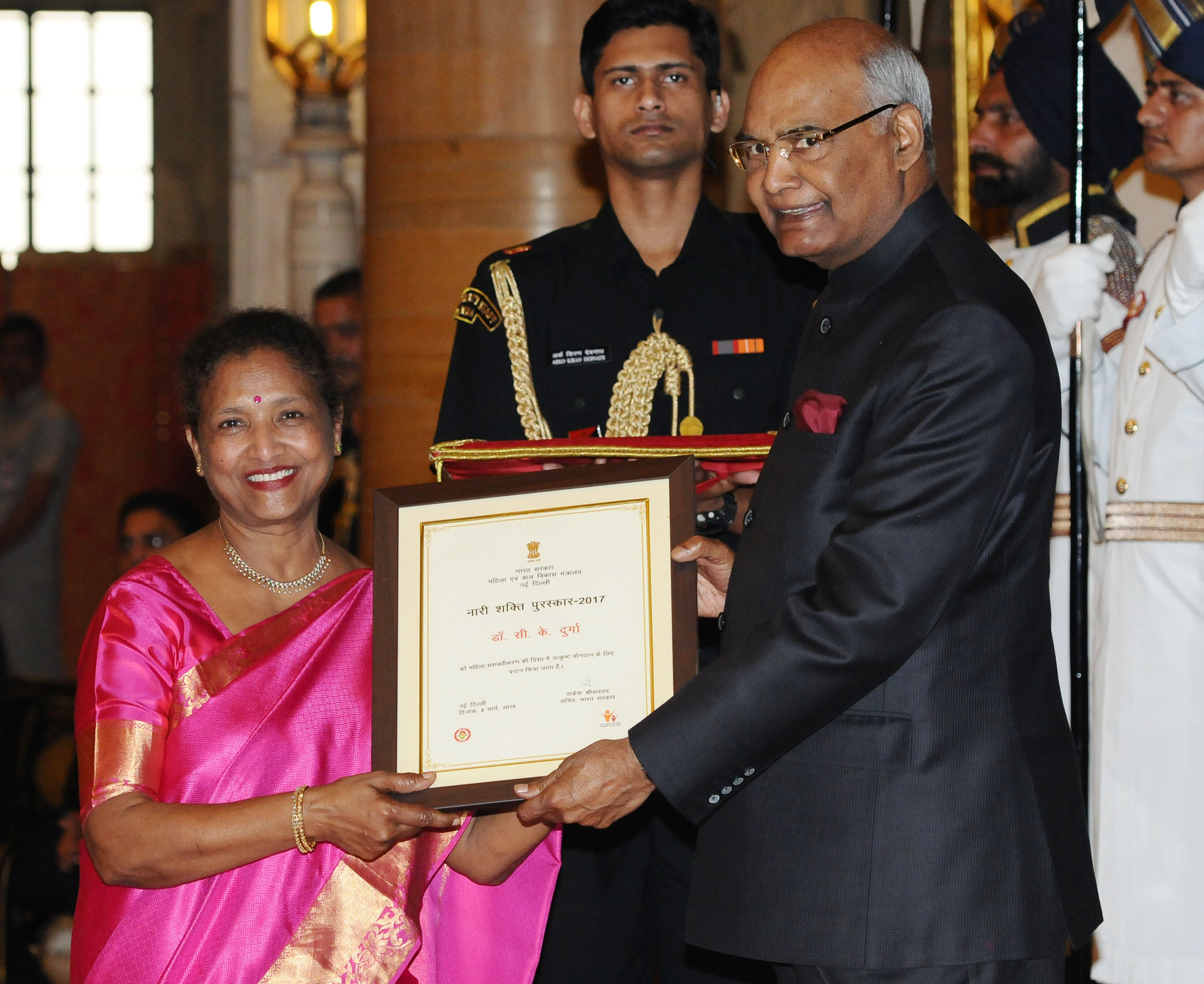
- C.K. Durga receiving Nari Shakti Puraskar for the year 2017 from President of India Ram Nath Kovind at Rashtrapati Bhavan
- Education: MBBS; M.S. (Surgery)
- Occupations: Surgeon, Oncologist
- Known for: Development of breast cancer surgery technique
- Awards: Nari Shakti Puraskar (2018)

C. K. Durga is an Indian surgeon and oncologist. She developed a breast cancer surgery technique that simultaneously removes the cancer and reconstructs the breast using the patient's own tissue, which has been widely adopted by surgeons worldwide. She is known for her contributions to women's health, particularly through her extensive research on breast cancer.

She is the recipient of the 2018 Nari Shakti Puraskar, India's highest civilian honour for women, given by the Government of India.

== Life and career ==
She obtained her MBBS and later completed her M.S. (Surgery) in 1981. She began her career as a senior resident at Dr. Ram Manohar Lohia Hospital and later became a specialist in 1987. Presently, she holds the position of Professor in Surgery at the Postgraduate Institute of Medical Education and Research and serves as Consultant and Head of the Department of Surgery at Dr. Ram Manohar Lohia Hospital, New Delhi. She also serves as Associate Editor of the Indian Journal of Surgery and is a Co-opted GC member of the Association of Surgeons of India from Delhi since 2018.

In 2017, Durga was elected as President of the Delhi Chapter of the Association of Surgeons of India. She received the Best State Chapter award by the Association of Surgeons of India the same year. She has mentored numerous students in cancer research and conducted awareness programs designed to enhance the quality of life for cancer patients.
