= Urmi Basu =

Indian woman protecting girls in red light areas

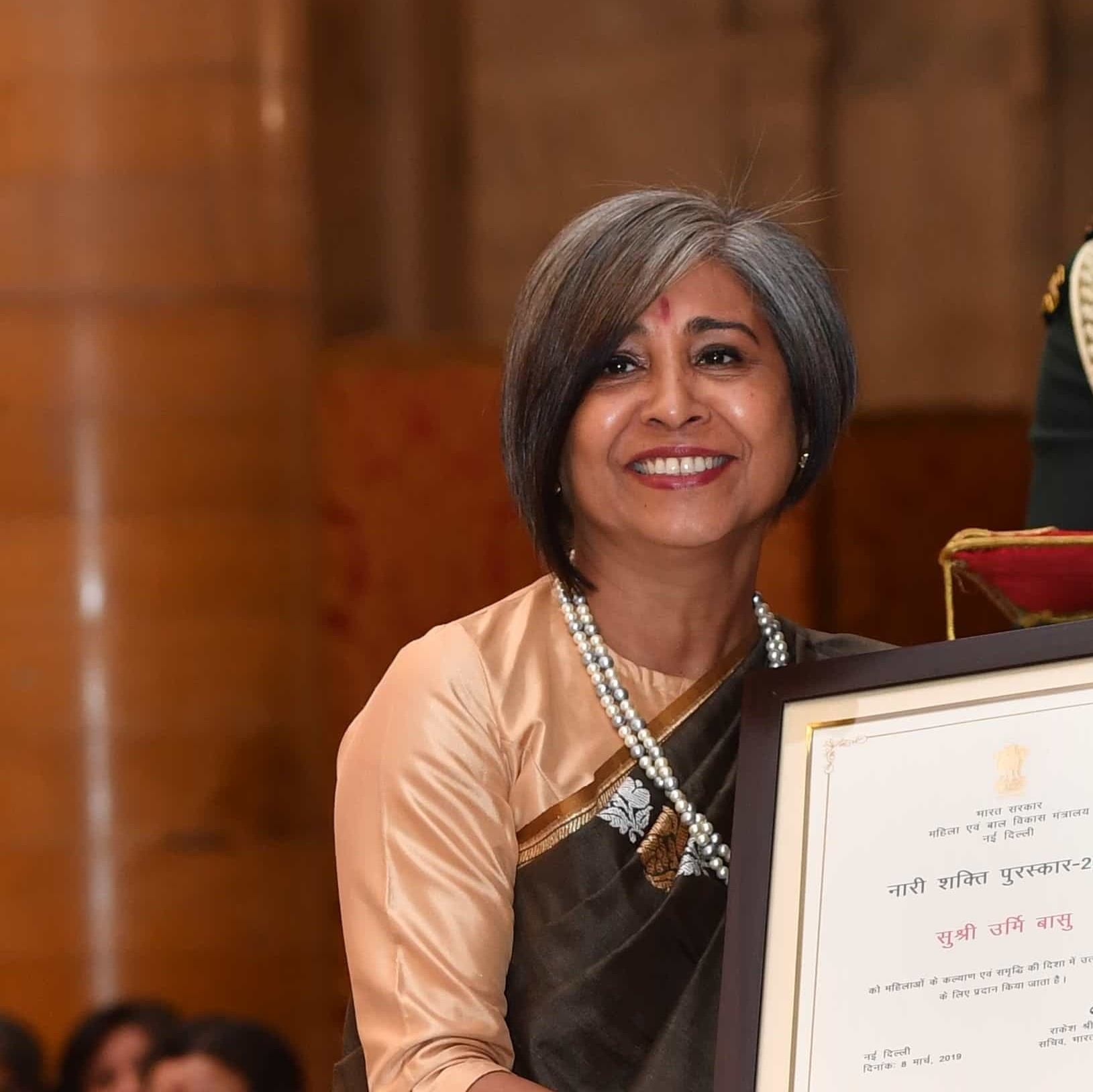
- in 2017
- Born: Kolkata
- Education: Tata Institute of Social Sciences (MA)
- Known for: founding New Light
- Spouse: 2

Urmi Basu is an Indian activist who has been protecting sex workers in Kolkata. In 2019 she received the Nari Shakti Puraskar - the highest award for women in India.

== Life ==
Basu was born in Kolkata. Her parents were both medical professionals. Basu graduated with a MA in Social Work from Tata Institute of Social Sciences, Mumbai in 1986.

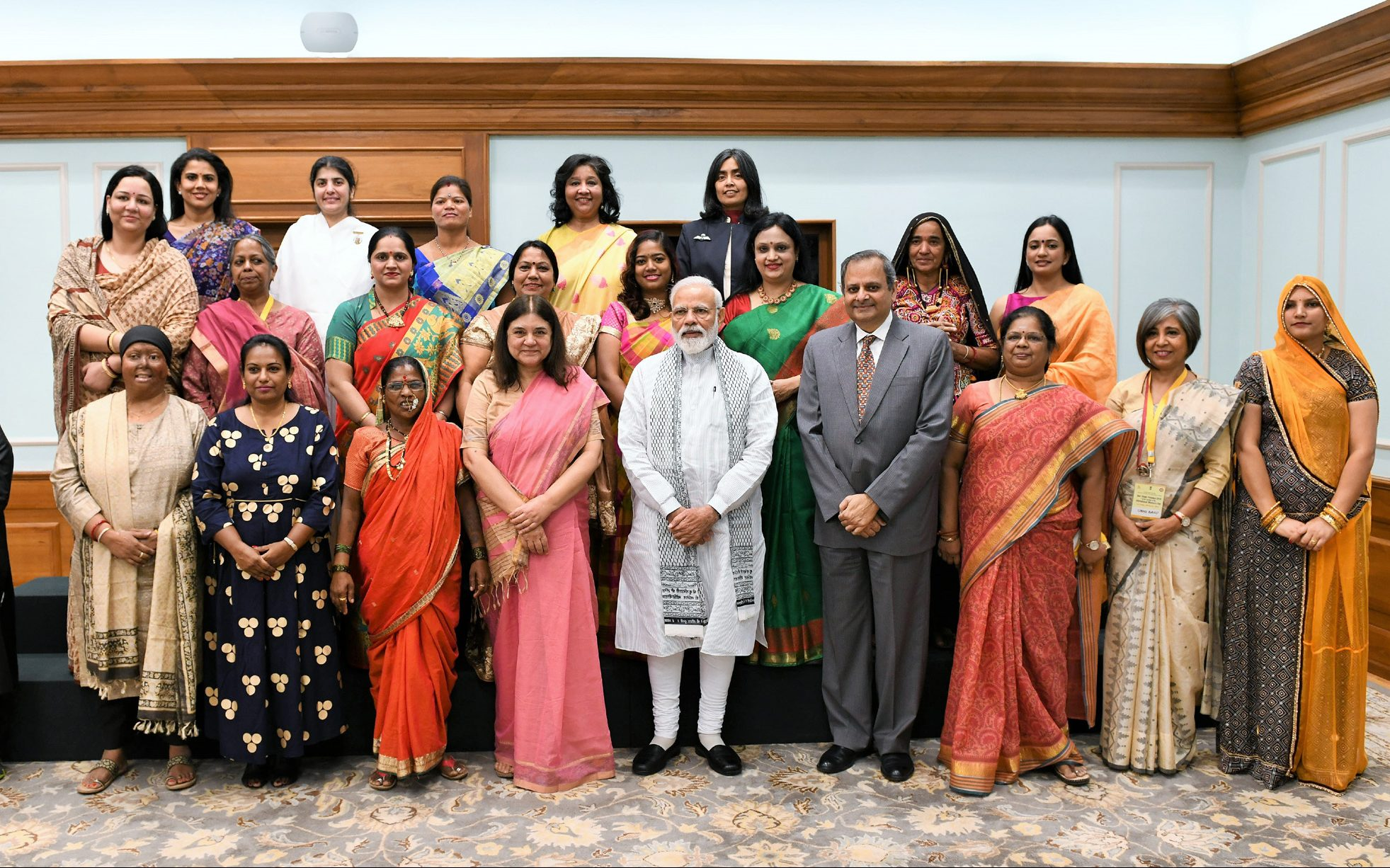
The Nari Shakti Puraskar awardees. Basu is far right bar one

She founded the organisation, "New Light" that looks after sex workers in Kolkata in 2000. She used her own funds to create the organisation. It was said that she left her second husband when he was unsupportive of her work. New Light's base has a creche and it allows women to stay there in the night shelter. She is concerned about trans-generational prostitution, 90% of the daughters of sex workers follow them into prostitution starting at an average age of thirteen.

In 2012 she and her organisation were featured in an American (PBS) film titled "Half the Sky: Turning Oppression into Opportunity for Women Worldwide". It was a four-hour documentary which premiered on PBS in October 2012.

She was given the Nari Shakti Puraskar award on International Women's Day in 2019. The "2018" award was made in the Presidential Palace by the President of India. Prime Minister Narendra Modi was present.
