= Deepika Kundaji =

Indian farmer (born 1963)

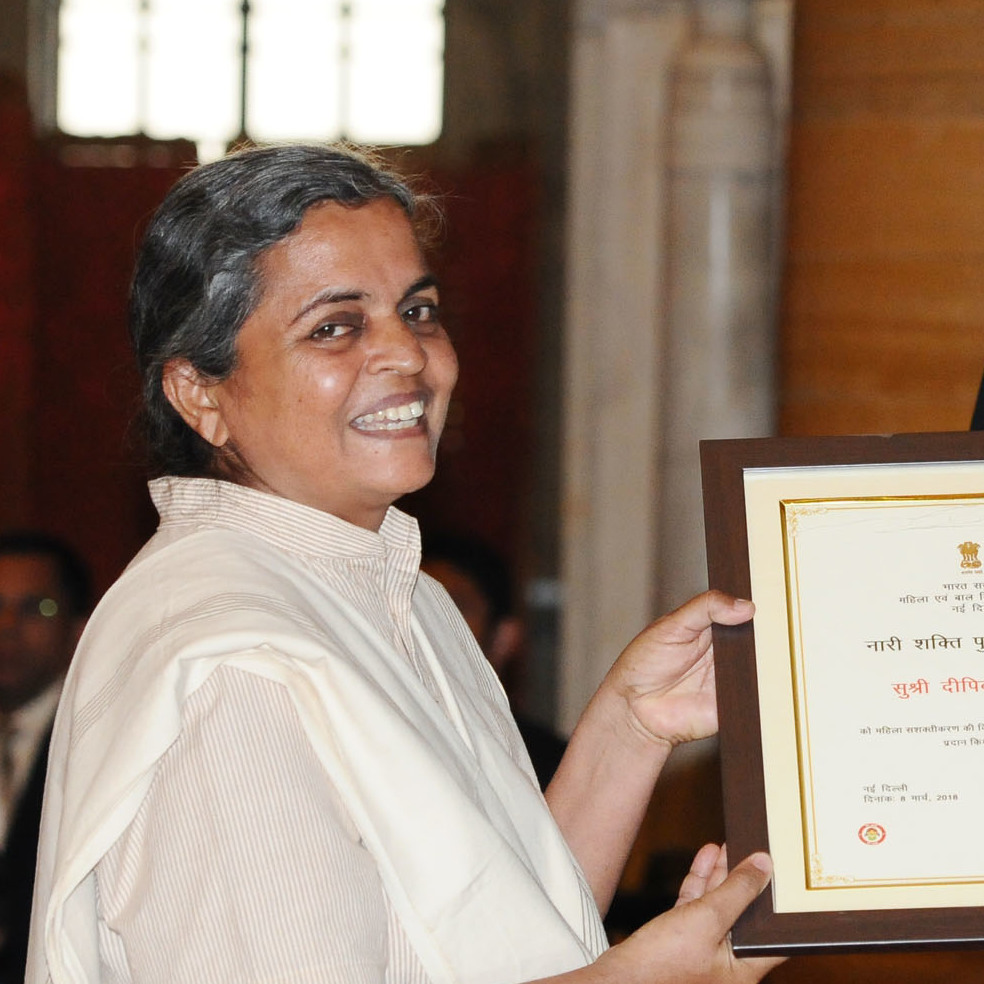
- Deepika Kundaji in 2017
- Born: c. 1963
- Education: archaeology
- Known for: transforming land in India

Deepika Kundaji (born c. 1963) is an Indian farmer whose methods gained national attention. The Nari Shakti Puraskar award is India's highest civilian award for women, presented by the President of India, Ram Nath Kovind, for contribution made by her in the field of farming.

== Early & personal Life ==
She was born in about 1963 and spent her childhood in Karnataka. She trained to be an archaeologist and she is married.

== Work ==
She has created the Pebble Garden in Auroville near Pondicherry which is an experiment. The Pebble Garden is built on dry valueless land. She is transforming the land without using external chemicals or even natural compost. She knows that plants are mostly created from the air and only a small part of them comes from the soil. If she can get a few varieties to thrive then they will create compost as they die and are replaced. Once this has started then other varieties can be introduced. She has worked with her husband Bernard Declercq since 1994 and they do not use external labour on their 9 acres of Pebble garden. The seven acres they own is an example of a type of land that was ruined they say by deforestation by French and British colonists. If they find out how to fix their land then there is 93 million hectares of land in India that also needs to be restored to productive and sustainable use.

In 2009 she had spoken about the importance of seeds. She believes that the local farmers in Auroville need to concentrate on preserving their seeds. The poor land is being transformed slowly using 80-90 different seed varieties but to achieve success they need to save and distribute about 3,000 packets of seeds. She ensures that the hardiest of varieties are conserved so that they can transform the land. She understands climate change is coming but it isn't new - climate does change. Kundaji notes that humans have been cultivating crops for 10,000 years and we need to exploit the varieties of crops that are available.

== Award & recognition ==
Deepika received the Nari Shakti Puraskar, from President of India, Ram Nath Kovind, in the Durbar Room of Rashtrapati Bhavan on International Women's Day. The award is India's highest civilian award for women. She had not been expecting the award. She had flown to New Delhi the night before after an official had contacted her at the start of March to mention the award. She had been dealing with both her brother and her mother who had needed her support when the phone call came.
