= Sumita Ghose =

Indian entrepreneur

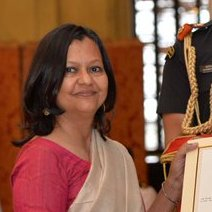
- receiving the Nari Shakti Puraskar
- Born: Kolkata
- Education: Mumbai
- Spouse: Sanjay Ghose

Sumita Ghose, is an Indian entrepreneur who started the Rangsutra collective and won the Nari Shakti Puraskar award from the president of India. Hundreds of artisans co-own Rangsutra and through the company they sell their goods bridging the gap to global customers such as Ikea.

== Life ==
Ghose was born in Kolkata, and she graduated in Mumbai before taking a master's degree in economics. She was married to Sanjoy Ghose, and they worked with rural communities trying to improve health education in Rajasthan. Her husband was kidnapped in Assam by the United Liberation Front of Assam and he never returned.

For many years she worked in rural areas of India trying to improve their society and economy. In 2007, Ghose decided that she would establish a business to assist rural artisans to find better paid work and the first task was to establish some working capital. She did not have that kind of money, and the banks could see that she had no collateral to offer to secure a loan. Ghose decided that she would persuade the artisans to invest and in exchange they would own shares in the emerging company. It worked although some of the investors now owned share certificates, and this was their only possession as everything else in their lives belonged to their husbands. The new business was the Rangsutra collective.

Ghose was chosen to receive the Nari Shakti Puraskar on International Women's Day in 2016. The award was made by President Pranab Mukherjee at the Presidential palace in New Delhi. Another fourteen women and seven institutions were honoured that day. At the time Rangsutra had 2,000 artisan investors in the collective.

In 2020, Ikea launched its Botanisk range created by their designers in collaboration with social entrepreneurs in Thailand, Romania, Jordan and India. Rangsutra, which Ghosh still leads, was one of their India suppliers together with Industree, and Ramesh Flowers. Rangsutra is supplying cushion covers made from sustainable materials fitting in with the botanical theme. They and Ikea are creating work for hand loom weavers and other rural artisans.

== Awards ==
Ghosh has also been awarded grants and fellowships. She has been in the Fulbright Program, and the Aspen Institute.
