= Vanastree =

Indian conservation project

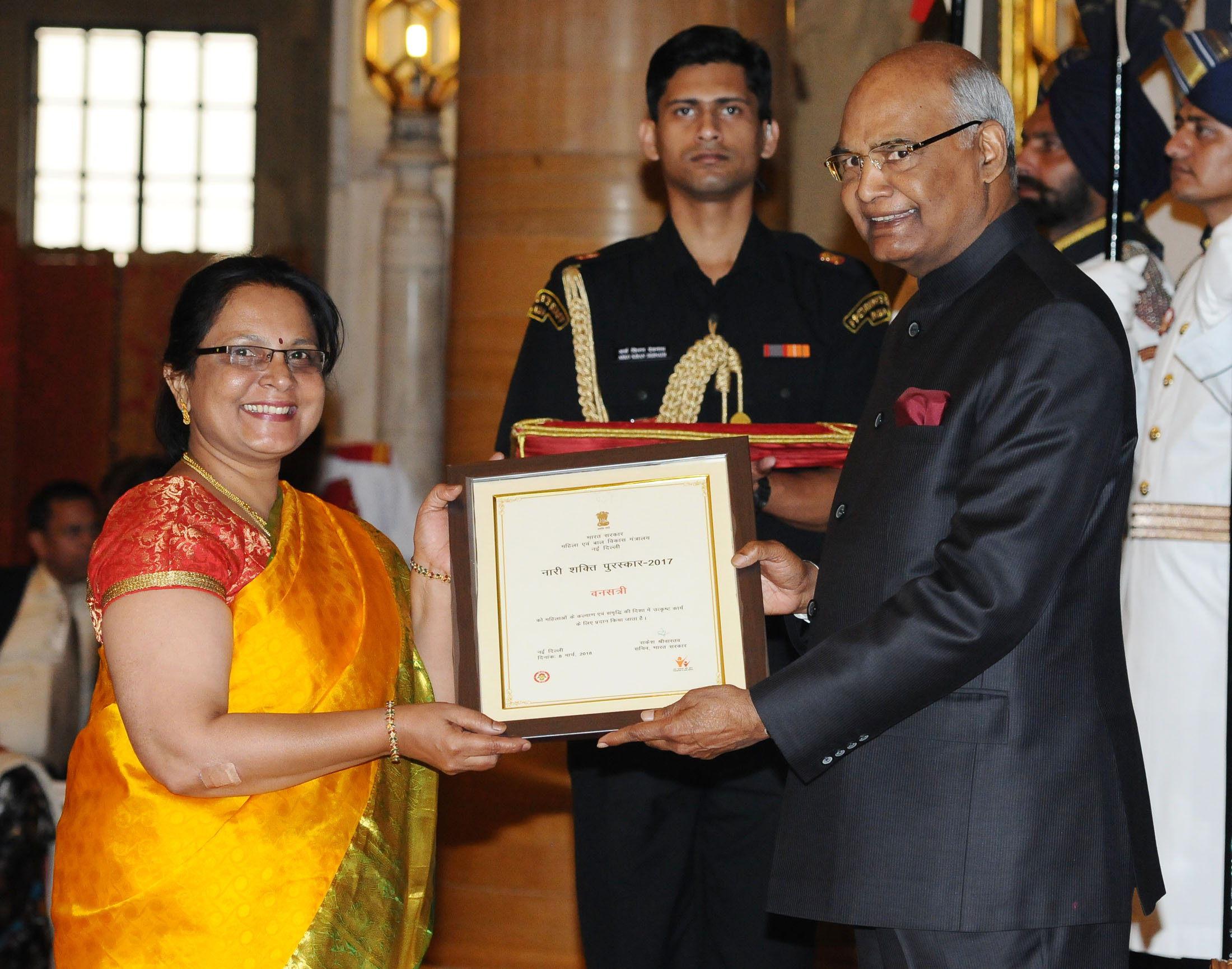
- A representative of Vanastree receiving the 2017 Nari Shakti Puraskar
- Origins: 2008
- Official language: Kannada
- Award: Nari Shakti Puraskar
- Website: vanastree.org

Vanastree is a farming and conservation project registered in 2008, in Uttara Kannada, in the Indian state of Karnataka. In Kannada, Vanastree means "Women of the Forest". As of 2013, Vanastree numbered 150 women farming sustainably and it promotes seed exchange. By 2017, Vanastree products were available for sale in Bengaluru, the capital of Karnataka. The same year, Vanastree was awarded the Nari Shakti Puraskar in recognition of its achievements.

The Vanastree garden in Sirsi has saved seeds from over 100 types of vegetables. Sisters Mala and Sonia Dhawan worked with Vanastree and then set up the handicrafts organisation A Hundred Hands.
