= Nari Shakti Puraskar =

Highest civilian honour for women in India

- Civilian award
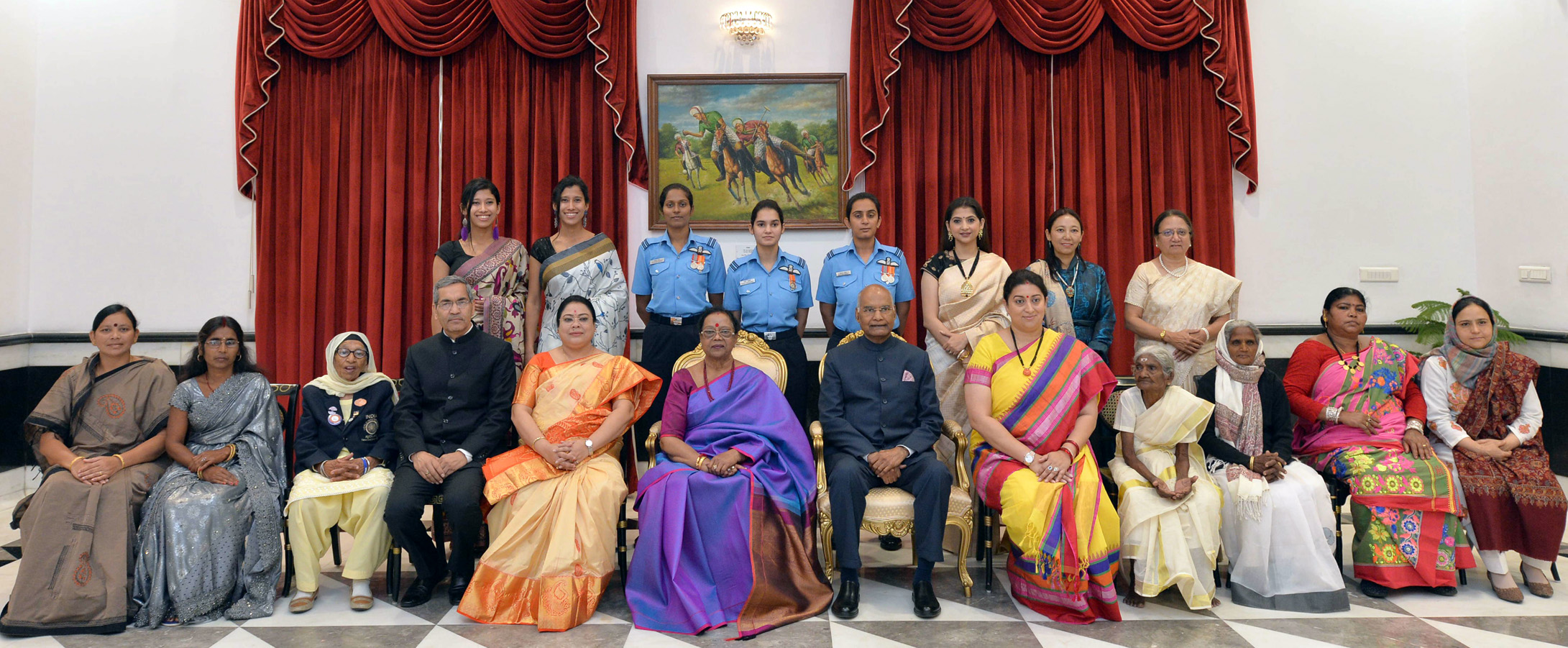
- Ram Nath Kovind with the recipients of the 2019 awards
- Awarded for: National Award in recognition of exceptional work for women empowerment
- Sponsored by: Ministry of Women and Child Development, Government of India
- Formerly called: Stree Shakti Puraskar
- Reward: ₹ 1–2 lakh
- First award: 1999
- Final award: 2021
- Website: Nari Shakti Puraskar

The Nari Shakti Puraskar (lit. 'Woman Power Award') is an annual award given by the Ministry of Women and Child Development of the Government of India to individual women or to institutions that work towards the cause of women empowerment. It is presented by the president of India on International Women's Day (8 March) at Rashtrapati Bhavan in New Delhi. The award was instituted in 1999 under the title of Stree Shakti Puraskar (lit. 'Woman Power Award'), renamed and reorganised in 2015. It is awarded in six institutional and two individual categories, which carry a cash prize of 200,000 and 100,000 rupees, respectively.

== Categories ==
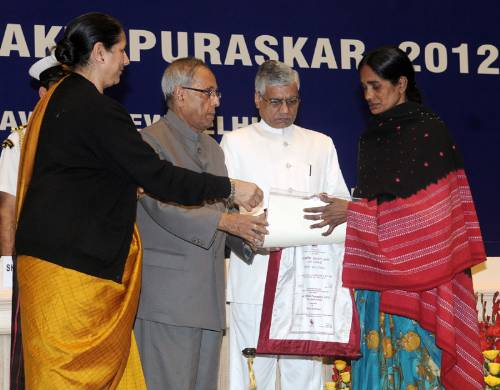
Then President of India, Pranab Mukherjee bestowing the 2012 Rani Lakshmibai Stree Shakti Puraskar posthumously on 2012 Delhi gang rape victim, Nirbhaya.

The Nari Shakti Puraskar is given in six institutional categories and two categories for individual women.

=== Institutional categories ===
Each of the six institutional categories is named after an eminent woman in Indian history.

- Devi Ahilya Bai Holkar Award for best private sector organization or public sector undertaking in promoting the well-being and welfare of women. Named after Ahilyabai Holkar, an 18th-century ruler of the Malwa kingdom.
- Kannagi Devi Award for best state which has appreciably improved Child Sex Ratio (CSR). Named after Kannagi, the central character of the Tamil epic Silapathikaram.
- Mata Jijabai Award for best urban local body for providing services and facilities to women. Named after Mata Jijabai, mother of Chatrapati Shivaji Maharaj, who founded the Maratha Empire in the 17th century.
- Rani Gaidinliu Zeliang Award given to a civil society organisation (CSO) doing outstanding work for the welfare and well-being of women. Named after Rani Gaidinliu, a 20th-century Naga spiritual and political leader
- Rani Lakshmi Bai Award given to the best institution for research and development in the field of women empowerment. Named after Lakshmibai, one of the leading figures of the Indian Rebellion of 1857 and a queen of Jhansi.
- Rani Rudramma Devi Awards given to two District Panchayats and two Gram Panchayats for work in the area of women welfare especially related to the Beti Bachao, Beti Padhao Yojana. Named after Rudrama Devi, a 13th-century ruler of Deccan Plateau.

=== Individual categories ===
- Award for courage and bravery
- Awards for making outstanding contributions to women’s endeavour, community work, or making a difference, or women's empowerment

== History ==
Stree Shakti Puraskar, the predecessor of the Nari Shakti Puraskar, was instituted in the year 1999. It carried a cash prize of ₹100,000 and a citation. The Stree Shakti Puraskar was given in the same six categories as the Nari Shakti Award.

1999 to 2015 Stree Shakti Puraskar
Year	Kannagi Devi Award	Mata Jijabai Award	Devi Ahilyabai Holkar Award	Jhansi Ki Rani Laxmibai Award	Rani Gaidinliu Award	Rani Rudramma Devi Award
1999	K. V. Rabiya	Chinna Pillai	Brahmacharini Kamala Bai	Kinkri Devi	Kumari Lalita Pradkar	—
2001	Satya Rani Chadha	Mukta P. Dagli	Thamma Pawar	Mah-Naaz Warsi	Sumani Jhodia	—
2002	Mahjabi Sarbar	Sunita Yadav	Shanta Trivedi	Yamuna Sarojini Devi	Auda Viegas	—
2003	Vandana Gopikumar	Kamala Khora	Sunita Krishnan	Gopa Kothari	Bhagirathi Dutta	—
2004	Pinki Virani	Shamshad Begum	Kavita Srivastava	Triveni Balkrishna Acharya	Monmohani Debnath	—
2005	Shaik Shamshad Begum	Sandhya Raman	Neeta Bahadur	Rani Bang	Salmin Lyngdoh	—
2006	Kalpana Sarkar	Nighat Shafi Pandit	D. Shanthi	Vanguri Suvartha	Seno Tsuhah	—
2007	Aruna Tara	V. Vijaya	Vaishnavi Jayakumar	Rani Devi	Buangi Sailo	—
2008	Mahe Jabeen	—	Hina Shah	Sunita Devi	Jhingubai Shrawan Bolake	—
2009	Phoolbasan Bai Yadav	—	Rashmi Singh	M. Vijaya	Ved Kumari Ghai	Sugatha Kumari
2010	Thagu Maya Bardewa	—	Monika S. Garg	Pottabathini Padmavathi	Rathnamma	—
2011	Kanwaljit Kaur	Jagmati Malik	Hypno Padma Kamlakar	Sandhya Pandey	Draupadi Ghimiray	Rakhee Gupta Bhandari
2012	Guramma H. Sankina	Sonika Agarwal	Olga D’mello	—	Omana T.K	Pranita Talukdar
2013	T. Radha K. Prashanti	Bina Sheth Lashkari	Seema Sakhare	Manasi Pradhan	Vartika Nanda	M. Venkaiah
2014	P Bhanumati	Chandraprabha Bokey	Anyay Rahit Zindagi (NGO)	Seema Prakash	Sister Mariola	Astha Sansthan (NGO)
2015	State of Haryana	—	Konoklota Mahila Urban Co-Operative Bank, Assam	Technology, Information, Forecasting & Assessment Council (TIFAC)	Guria Swayam Sevi Sansthan	Angadipuram Gramma Panchayat, Kerala

== 1999 recipients ==
The first Stree Shakti Puraskar awards were conferred on five women by Prime Minister Atal Bihari Vajpayee at the Vigyan Bhavan in New Delhi on 4 January 2001:

- Kannagi Stree Shakti Puraskar awarded to K. V. Rabiya of Malappuram district, Kerala for her efforts to promote the education of children with physical and/or mental disabilities
- Mata Jijabai Stree Shakti Puraskar awarded to Chinna Pillai of Madurai, Tamil Nadu for her efforts towards initiating and spreading the microcredit movement and changing the lives of women living in poverty.
- Devi Ahilyabai Holkar Stree Shakti Puraskar awarded to Brahmacharini Kamala Bai of Nagaur district, Rajasthan for establishing schools for girls
- Jhansi Ki Rani Laxmibai Stree Shakti Puraskar awarded to Kinkri Devi of Sirmaur district, Himachal Pradesh for leading public opposition to illegal mining
- Rani Gaidinliu Stree Shakti Puraskar awarded to Kumari Lalita Pradkar of Dhar district, Madhya Pradesh

== 2001 recipients ==
Five women were awarded the 2001 Stree Shakti Puraskar on 26 March 2003:

- Kannagi Stree Shakti Puraskar awarded to Satya Rani Chadha
- Mata Jijabai Stree Shakti Puraskar awarded to Mukta P. Dagli
- Devi Ahilyabai Holkar Stree Shakti Puraskar awarded to Thamma Pawar
- Jhansi Ki Rani Laxmibai Stree Shakti Puraskar awarded to Mah-Naaz Warsi
- Rani Gaidinliu Stree Shakti Puraskar awarded to Sumani Jhodia

== 2002 recipients ==
The recipients of the 2002 and 2003 Stree Shakti Puraskar were announced on 19 November 2006.

- Kannagi Award to Mahjabi Sarbar
- Mata Jijabai Award to Sunita Yadav,
- Devi Ahilya Bai Holkar Award to Shanta Trivedi
- Jhansi Ki Rani Lakshmi Bai Award to Yamuna Sarojini Devi
- Rani Gaidinliu Zeliang Award to Auda Viegas

== 2003 recipients ==
- Kannagi Award to Vandana Gopikumar
- Mata Jijabai Award to Kamala Khora
- Devi Ahilya Bai Holkar Award to Sunita Krishnan
- Jhansi Ki Rani Lakshmi Bai Award to Gopa Kothari
- Rani Gaidinliu Zeliang Award to Bhagirathi Dutta

== 2004 recipients ==
The recipients of the 2004, 2005 and 2006 Stree Shakti Puraskar were announced on 8 March 2008.

- Kannagi Award to Pinki Virani, Delhi
- Mata Jijabai Award to Shamshad Begum, khammam
- Devi Ahilya Bai Holkar Award to Kavita Srivastava, Rajasthan
- Jhansi Ki Rani Lakshmi Bai Award to Triveni Balkrishna Acharya, Maharashtra
- Rani Gaidinliu Zeliang Award to Monmohani Debnath, Tripura

== 2005 recipients ==
- Kannagi Award to Shaik Shamshad Begum, Andhra Pradesh
- Mata Jijabai Award to Sandhya Raman, Delhi
- Devi Ahilya Bai Holkar Award to Neeta Bahadur, Uttar Pradesh
- Jhansi Ki Rani Lakshmi Bai Award to Rani Bang, Maharashtra
- Rani Gaidinliu Zeliang Award to Salmin Lyngdoh, Meghalaya

== 2006 recipients ==
- Kannagi Award to Kalpana Sarkar, Madhya Pradesh
- Mata Jijabai Award to Nighat Shafi Pandit, Jammu and Kashmir
- Devi Ahilya Bai Holkar Award to D. Shanthi, Tamil Nadu
- Jhansi Ki Rani Lakshmi Bai Award to Vanguri Suvartha, Andhra Pradesh
- Rani Gaidinliu Zeliang Award to Senu Tsuhah, Nagaland

== 2007 recipients ==
The recipients of the 2007 Stree Shakti Puraskar were announced on 28 February 2009:

- Kannagi Award to Aruna Tara, Andhra Pradesh
- Mata Jijabai Award to V. Vijaya, Andhra Pradesh
- Devi Ahilya Bai Holkar Award to Vaishnavi Jayakumar, Tamil Nadu
- Jhansi Ki Rani Lakshmi Bai Award to Rani Devi, Haryana
- Rani Gaidinliu Zeliang Award to Buangi Sailo, Mizoram

== 2008 recipients ==
The recipients of the 2008 and 2009 Stree Shakti Puraskar were announced on 8 March 2010.

- Kannagi Award to Mahe Jabeen, Andhra Pradesh
- Devi Ahilya Bai Holkar Award to Hina Shah, Gujarat
- Jhansi Ki Rani Lakshmi Bai Award to Sunita Devi, Haryana
- Rani Gaidinliu Zeliang Award to Jhingubai Shrawan Bolake, Maharashtra

== 2009 recipients ==
- Kannagi Award to Phoolbasan Bai Yadav, Chhattisgarh
- Devi Ahilya Bai Holkar Award to Rashmi Singh, Delhi
- Jhansi Ki Rani Lakshmi Bai to M. Vijaya, Karnataka
- Rani Gaidinliu Zeliang Award to Ved Kumari Ghai, Jammu & Kashmir
- Rani Rudramma Devi Award to Sugatha Kumari, Kerala

== 2010 recipients ==
The 2010 Stree Shakti Puraskar was awarded to four women:

- Kannagi Award to Thagu Maya Bardewa from Sikkim
- Devi Ahilya Bai Holkar Award to Monika S. Garg from Uttar Pradesh
- Rani Lakshmi Bai Award to Pottabathini Padmavathi from Andhra Pradesh
- Rani Gaidinliu Zeliang Award to Rathnamma from Karnataka

== 2011 recipients ==
The 2011 Stree Shakti Puraskar was awarded to six women:

- Kannagi Award to Kanwaljit Kaur from Chandigarh
- Mata Jijabai Award to Jagmati Malik from Haryana
- Devi Ahilya Bai Holkar Award to Hypno Padma Kamlakar from Andhra Pradesh
- Rani Lakshmi Bai Award to Sandhya Pandey from Chhattisgarh
- Rani Gaidinliu Zeliang Award to Draupadi Ghimiray from Sikkim
- Rani Rudramma Devi Award to Rakhee Gupta Bhandari from Delhi

== 2012 recipients ==
The 2012 Stree Shakti Puraskar was awarded to five women. In addition, the Rani Lakshmi Bai Award was posthumously dedicated to the "Spirit of Nirbhaya".

- Kannagi Award to Guramma H. Sankina from Karnataka
- Mata Jijabai Award to Sonika Agarwal from Delhi
- Devi Ahilya Bai Holkar Award to Olga D’mello of Maharashtra
- Rani Gaidinliu Zeliang Award to Omana T.K from Kerala
- Rani Rudramma Devi Award to Pranita Talukdar from Assam

== 2013 recipients ==
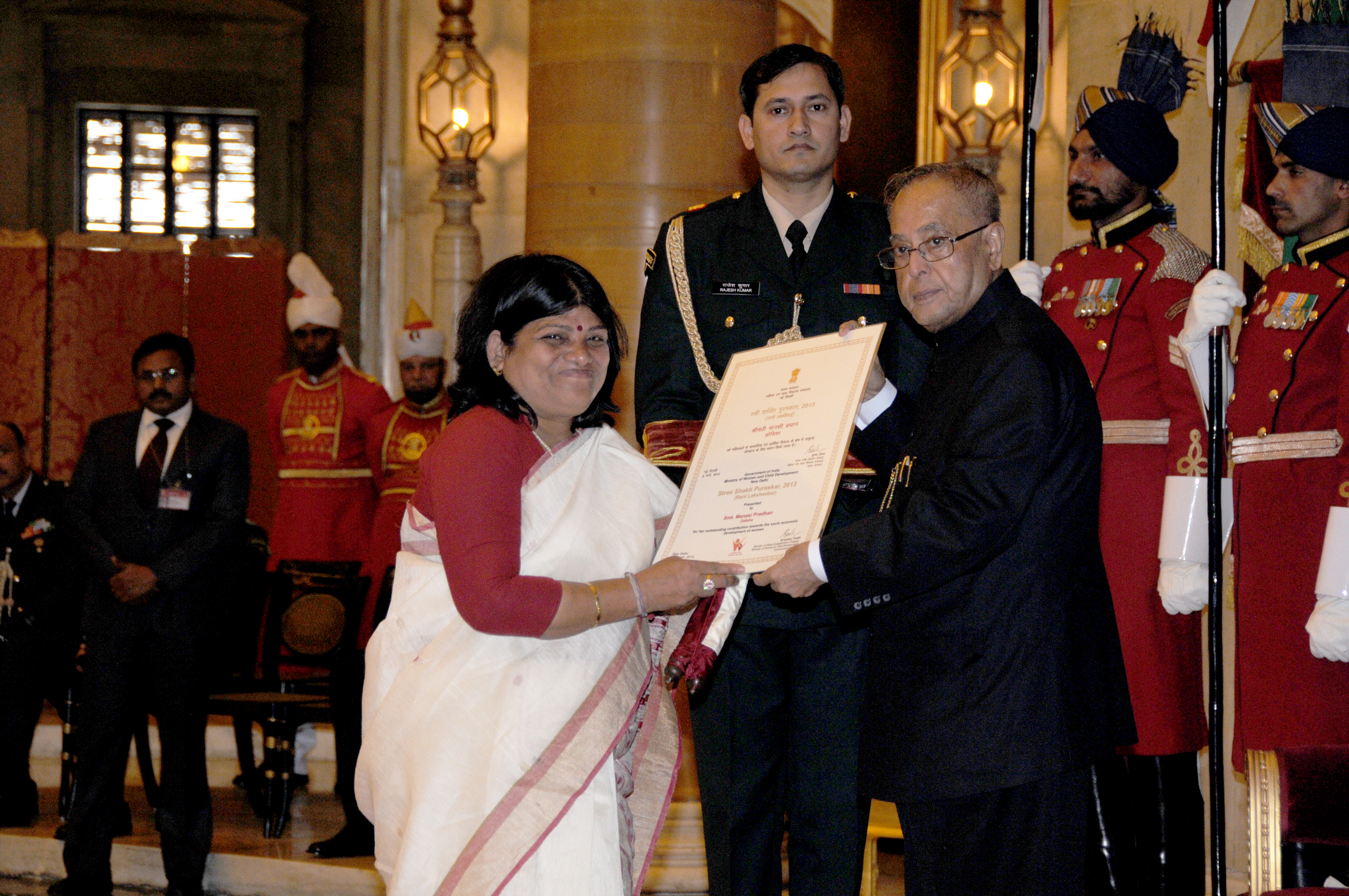
President of India Pranab Mukherjee bestowing the 2013 Rani Lakshmibai Stree Shakti Puraskar on Manasi Pradhan at Rashtrapati Bhawan in New Delhi on 8 March 2014.

The 2013 Stree Shakti Puraskar was awarded to six recipients:

- Kannagi Award to T. Radha K. Prashanti from Andhra Pradesh
- Mata Jijabai Award to Bina Sheth Lashkari from Maharashtra
- Devi Ahilya Bai Holkar Award to Seema Sakhare from Maharashtra
- Rani Lakshmi Bai Award to Manasi Pradhan from Odisha
- Rani Gaidinliu Zeliang Award to Vartika Nanda from Delhi
- Rani Rudramma Devi Award to M. Venkaiah from Andhra Pradesh

== 2014 recipients ==
For the year 2014, the Stree Shakti Puraskar was awarded to four individuals and two organizations:

- Kannagi Award to P Bhanumati of Kerala
- Mata Jijabai Award to Chandraprabha Bokey from Maharashtra
- Devi Ahilya Bai Holkar Award to Anyay Rahit Zindagi (NGO) of Goa
- Rani Lakshmi Bai Award to Seema Prakash of Madhya Pradesh
- Rani Gaidinliu Zeliang Award to Sister Mariola from Rajasthan
- Rani Rudramma Devi Award to Astha Sansthan (NGO) of Rajasthan

8 women received the Nari Shakti Puraskar, which was conferred for the first time:

- Rashmi Anand
- Nanditha Krishna
- Laxmi Gautam
- Neha Kirpal
- Latika Thukral
- Sailakshmi Balijepally
- P. Kausalya
- Swaraj Vidwan

== 2015 recipients ==
The award was given to 22 recipients: 7 institutions and 15 individuals. The individual recipients are listed below:

- Lucy Kurien
- Saurabh Suman
- Basanti Devi
- Suparna Baksi Ganguly
- Meena Sharma
- Preeti Patkar
- Uttara Padwar
- Polumati Vijaya Nirmala
- Vasu Primlani
- Sujata Sahu (17000 ft Foundation)
- Jyoti Mhapsekar
- Sumita Ghosh
- Anjali Sharma
- Krishna Yadav
- Shakuntala Majumdar

The institutional awards for 2015 were divided into categories:

- Kannagi Award to the State of Haryana
- Devi Ahilya Bai Holkar Award to the Konoklota Mahila Urban Co-Operative Bank, Assam
- Rani Lakshmi Bai Awards to the Technology, Information, Forecasting & Assessment Council (TIFAC), Delhi and the Breakthrough Trust, Delhi
- Rani Gaidinliu Zeliang Awards to Jagori, Delhi and Guria Swayam Sevi Sansthan, Uttar Pradesh
- Rani Rudramma Devi Award to the Angadipuram Gramma Panchayat, Kerala

== 2016 recipients ==
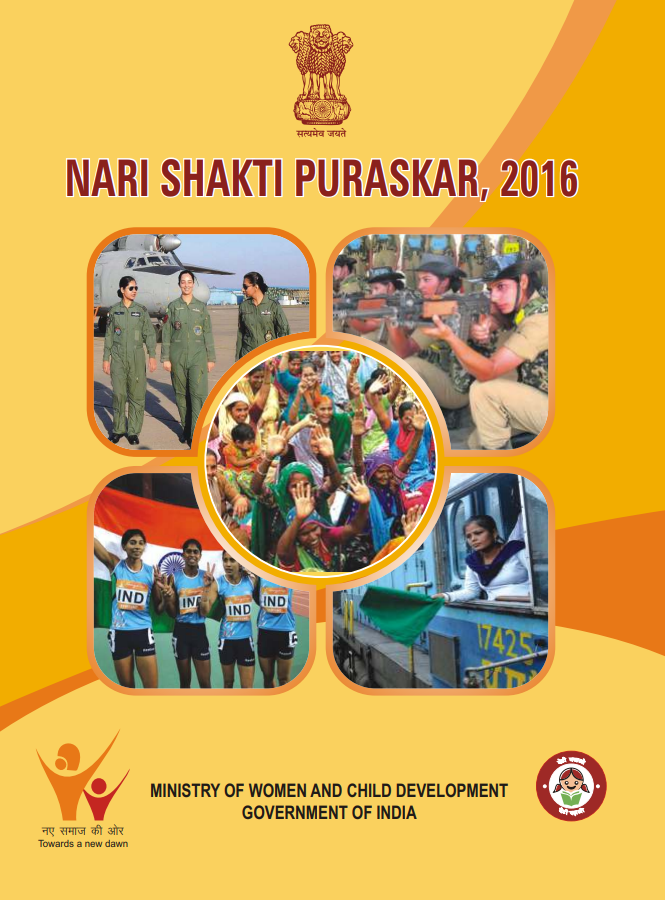
Nari Shakti Puraskar 2016 recipients

The award was given to 33 recipients: 6 institutions and 27 individuals.

- State of Rajasthan
- Chhanv Foundation, Delhi
- Mizo Hmeichhe Insuihkhawm Pawl (MHIP), Mizoram
- Sadhana Mahila Sangha, Karnataka
- Shikshit Rojgar Kendra Prabandhak Samiti, Rajasthan
- Tripunithura Kathakali Kendram Ladies Troupe, Kerala
- Amruta Patil, Goa
- Amala Akkineni, Telangana
- Anatta Sonney, Karnataka (Joint Award)
- Anoyara Khatun, West Bengal
- B. Codanayaguy, Puducherry (Joint Award)
- Bano Haralu, Nagaland
- Deepa Mathur, Rajasthan
- Divya Rawat, Uttarakhand
- Ilse Köhler Rollefson, Rajasthan
- Janki Vasant, Gujarat
- Kalpana Sankar, Tamil Nadu
- Kalyani Pramod Balakrishnan, Tamil Nadu
- Mumtaz M. Kazi, Maharashtra
- Nandita Shah, Tamil Nadu
- Pallavi Fauzdar, Delhi
- Pamela Malhotra, Karnataka
- Qamar Dagar, Delhi
- Reema Sathe, Maharashtra
- Ringyuichon Vashum, Manipur
- Sangita Iyer, Kerala
- Smita Tandi, Chhattisgarh
- Sumitra Hazarika, Assam
- Sunita Singh Choken, Haryana
- Subha Varier, Kerala (Joint Award)
- Tiasa Adhya, West Bengal
- V. Nanammal, Tamil Nadu
- Zuboni Hümtsoe, Nagaland

== 2017 recipients ==
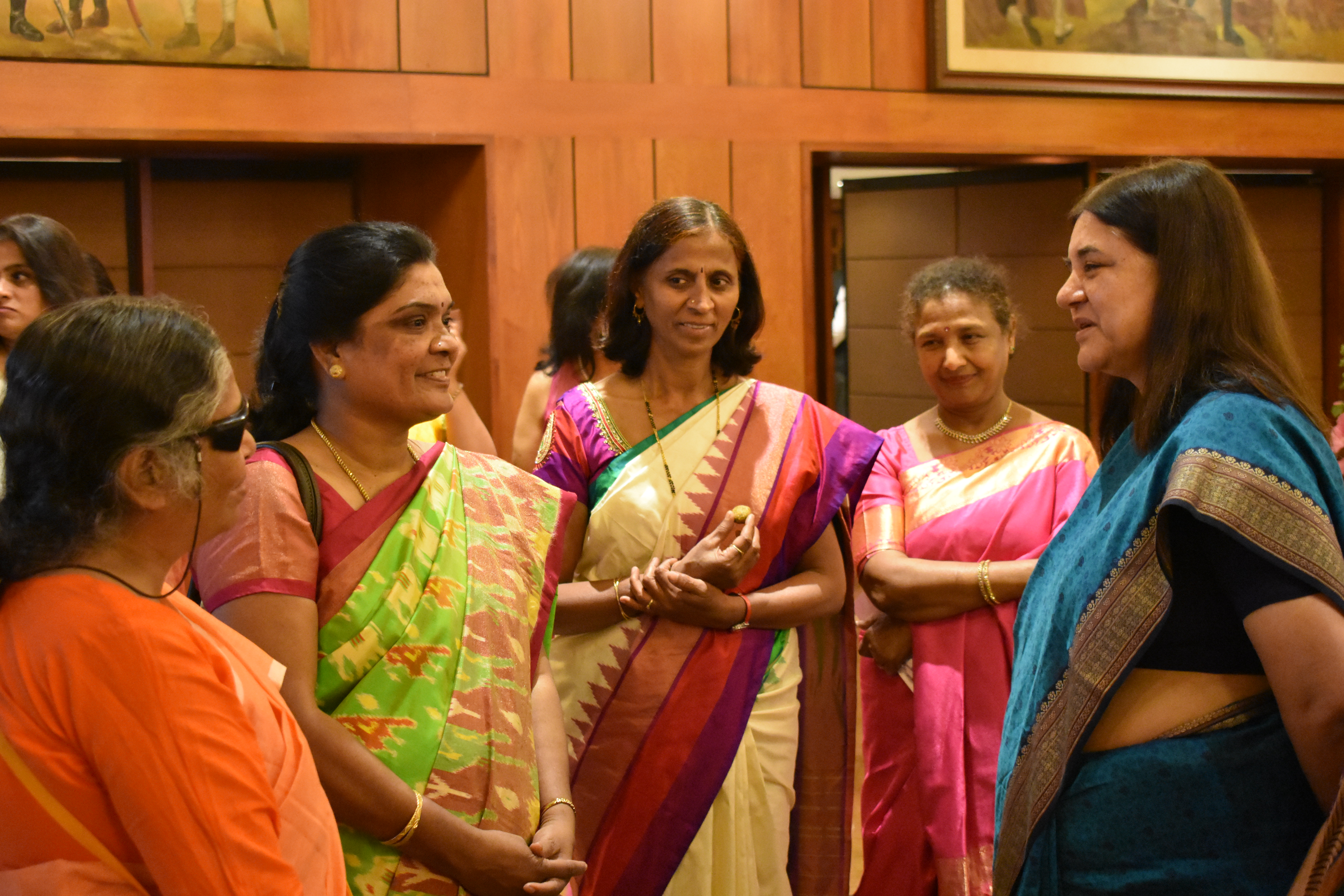
Gargi Gupta and other awardees of Nari Shakti Puraskar, 2017, Minister Maneka Gandhi.

39 individuals and institutions received the award.

- Gargi Gupta
- Sindhutai Sapkal
- Gauri Maulekhi
- Navika Sagar Parikrama – INSV Tarini Team – Combined Award to Lt. Cdr. Vartika Joshi, Lt. Cdr. Pratibha Jamwal, Lt. Cdr. Patarpalli Swathi, Lt. Aishwarya Bodapatti, Lt. SH Vijaya Devi and Lt. Payal Gupta.
- Dr. Malvika Iyer
- R Umadevi Nagaraj
- Thinlas Chorol
- S. Siva Sathya
- Bharti Kashyap – eye doctor
- Beti Zindabad Bakery
- Mittal Patel
- Sabarmatee Tiki
- Jayamma Bandari
- Syamala Kumari
- Vanastree
- Lizymol Philipose Pamadykandathil
- Chirom Indira
- Urmila Balawant Apte
- Deepika Kundaji
- Purnima Barman
- Anita Bharadwaj
- Ambica Beri
- Pushpa Girimaji
- Avani (organisation)
- Shrujan
- Dr. C.K. Durga
- Rekha Mishra
- Mehvish Mushtaq
- Karuna Society for Animals and Nature
- One Stop Centre, Raipur
- Millet Network of India
- State of Punjab
- Madhu Jain
- Jetsun Pema
- M. S. Sunil
- Sheela Balaji
- Anuradha Krishnamoorthy and Namrata Sundaresan
- Justice Gita Mittal

== 2018 recipients ==
The President of India, Ram Nath Kovind gave away the Nari Shakti Puraskar to 44 recipients, which includes 3 institutions. The award function was held on 8 March 2019. The awardees (in alphabetical order) are:

- A. Seema (Scientist, Centre for Material for Electronics Technology [CMET]) – Developed low cost technology for early detection and screening of breast cancer
- Anshu Khanna – Empowered women craftspersons through her project "Royal Fables"
- Anu Malhotra (Filmmaker) – Transformed the lives of people through her thought provoking films
- Anuradha N. Naik – Contributed in developing the skills of tribal women to cultivate and conserve local chilli variety in Goa
- Chetna Gala Sinha – Founder of a bank for and by rural women
- Darshana Gupta – Touched the lives of 3500 women by initiating mass marriages of those belonging to less privileged backgrounds
- Devaki Amma – An environmentalist who protected biodiversity by growing rare trees on her land in Kerala
- Delia Narayan Contractor (Self-taught architect) – Designed eco-friendly sustainable houses with mud and stone inspired from local traditions
- Gowri Kamakashi – Instrumental contribution in uplifting lives through her philanthropic interventions in healthcare
- Hekani Jakhalu Kense of YouthNet – Empowered women, unemployed and drop-out youth to develop skills and find livelihood
- Ipsita Biswas (Scientist, DRDO) – Crucial contribution in performance evaluation of armour material and life-saving devices like bullet-proof jackets for our armed and paramilitary forces
- Iti Tyagi – Contributed in conserving crafts culture by setting up a platform wherein artisans get a chance to connect with consumers, industry and patrons. The platform offers learning and sharing
- Kagganapalli Radha Devi – Instrumental in breaking traditional notions of gender and employing many female barbers in Tirupathi temple to tonsure the hair of women devotees.
- Kalpana Saroj – Revives a shut-down industrial unit. Provided employment to poor masses and women. Born in an underprivileged family, she is now a globally recognised business woman.
- Lalita Vakil – Chamba Rumal
- Madhuri Barthwal – First Garhwali female musician; dedicated her life towards folk music and its preservation
- Manju Manikuttan – A committed social worker, she has helped numerous Indian wo in Saudi Arabia who migrate for work and face foreign land issues
- Meenakshi Pahuja – An International level swimmer, She has played an instrumental role in the lives of young women and students with different abilities keeping an interest in swimming
- Mini Vasudevan – A passionate animal activist who has sensitised the public and relentlessly worked on various aspects of animal welfare and environmental sustainability
- Munuswamy Shanthi (Scientist, Satish Dhwan Space Center)
- Neelum Sharma – A senior correspondent at DD News & a filmmaker. Her strong advocacy of the marginalised section is reflected in several documentaries directed by her
- Nomita Kamdar – An entrepreneur who has played a key role in bringing public awareness about environmental issues through adventure sports and eco-tourism, thereby restoring the natural harmony in the Western Ghats
- Pamela Chatterjee – She has dedicated her life to the restoration of barren lands, uncultivable sodic soils and water conservation projects. She has supported numerous farmers through her work
- Pragya Prasun – An activist and social worker who survived an acid attack and now provides relief and rehabilitation to such survivors to enable them to thrive in life
- Priyamvada Singh – An entrepreneur who has created employment opportunities for villagers by restoring her 148 year old ancestral fort and developing it as a community-run home stay
- Pushpa Preeya – An exam scribe who has been writing exams for specially-enabled persons from the past 10 years and aims to contribute in their lives and careers
- Rahibai Soma Popere – Fondly known as "Seed Mother", she has conserved native seeds of several crops and prevented the exploitation of distressed farmers in Maharashtra
- Rajani Rajak – Iconic folk singer of Dhola Maru art form of Chhattisgarh, she has relentlessly worked to keep this art form alive through her performances
- Reshma Nilofer Naha – The first woman marine pilot in India
- Rhea Mazumdar Singhal – An entrepreneur building a sustainable environment by using agri-waste to make biodegradable food packaging
- Ruma Devi – Herself an artisan, she has empowered craftspersons by forming self-help groups, eliminating the middleman and bringing better profits to them. She works with over 11000 artisans as of now
- Seema Kaushik Mehta – A Kathak artiste who is inspiring the next generation of artists by teaching them Kathak
- Seema Rao – First and only woman commando trainer in India. She has trained over 15000 soldiers from Indian Army, Navy, Air, Paramilitary Police, NSG, ITBP, SVP, NPA Commando Wing SFF & Para Special Forces free of cost. She, along with her husband invented an indigenous method of reflex shooting, which is known as the Rao System of Reflex Fire which has benefited the Indian Army.
- Sister Shivani (Motivational speaker and teacher) – Her seminars and television programmes on human behaviour have transformed the millions of lives
- Smriti Morarka – Initiated "Tantuvi" to revive the weaving traditions of Benaras. She provides a platform to the young generation to take up weaving
- Snehlata Nath (Founder of Keystone Foundation) She has dedicated 26 years of her life to creating a harmonious balance between nature, humans and technology
- Sonia Jabbar (Tea planter & wildlife conservationist) – She founded the Haathi Saathi Nature Club for children and also established an elephant friendly tea estate
- Sujatha Mohan – She has spread awareness of the importance of eye donation, and provided essential eyecare services to the rural and poor population in Chennai
- Sunita Devi – Working on the issue of women's health and sanitation, she is a Rani Mistri (Master Trainer) under the Swacch Bharat Mission
- Twinkle Kalia – Provides free ambulance service for the needy in New Delhi
- Urmi Basu – By forming the "New Light" organisation, she has been instrumental in changing lives of the children of sex workers in Kolkata's red-light area
- One Stop Centre, Lucknow (Institutional Awardee)
- Qasab-Kutch Craftswomen Producer Co. Ltd. (Institutional Awardee)
- The Social Welfare and Nutritional Meal Programme Department, Tamil Nadu (Institutional Awardee)

== 2019 recipients ==
The President of India, Ram Nath Kovind gave away the Nari Shakti Puraskar to fifteen women achievers. The award function was held on 9 March 2020. List of the awardees:

- Padala Bhudevi from Srikakulam, Andhra Pradesh,
- Bina Devi from Munger, Bihar,
- Arifa Jan from Srinagar, Jammu and Kashmir,
- Chami Murmu from Rajnagar, Jharkhand,
- Nilza Wangmo from Leh in Ladakh,
- Rashmi Urdhwareshe from Pune, Maharashtra,
- Sardarni Mann Kaur from Patiala, Punjab,
- Kalavati Devi from Kanpur, Uttar Pradesh,
- Tashi Malik and Nungshi Malik from Dehradun, Uttarakhand,
- Kaushiki Chakraborty from Kolkata, West Bengal,
- Karthyayani Amma and Bhageerathi Amma from Kerala,
- Avani Chaturvedi from Rewa, Madhya Pradesh,
- Bhawana Kanth from Darbhanga, Bihar,
- Mohana Singh from Agra, Uttar Pradesh, from Indian Air Force.

== 2020 recipients ==
Awards given 8 March 2022.

- Anita Gupta
- Ushaben Dineshbhai Vasava
- Nasira Akhter
- Sandhya Dhar
- Nivruti Rai
- Tiffany Brar
- Padma Yangchan
- Jodhaiya Bai Baiga
- Saylee Nandkishor Agavane
- Vanita Jagdeo Borade
- Meera Thakur
- Jaya Muthu, Tejamma (joint)
- Ela Lodh
- Arti Rana

== 2021 recipients ==
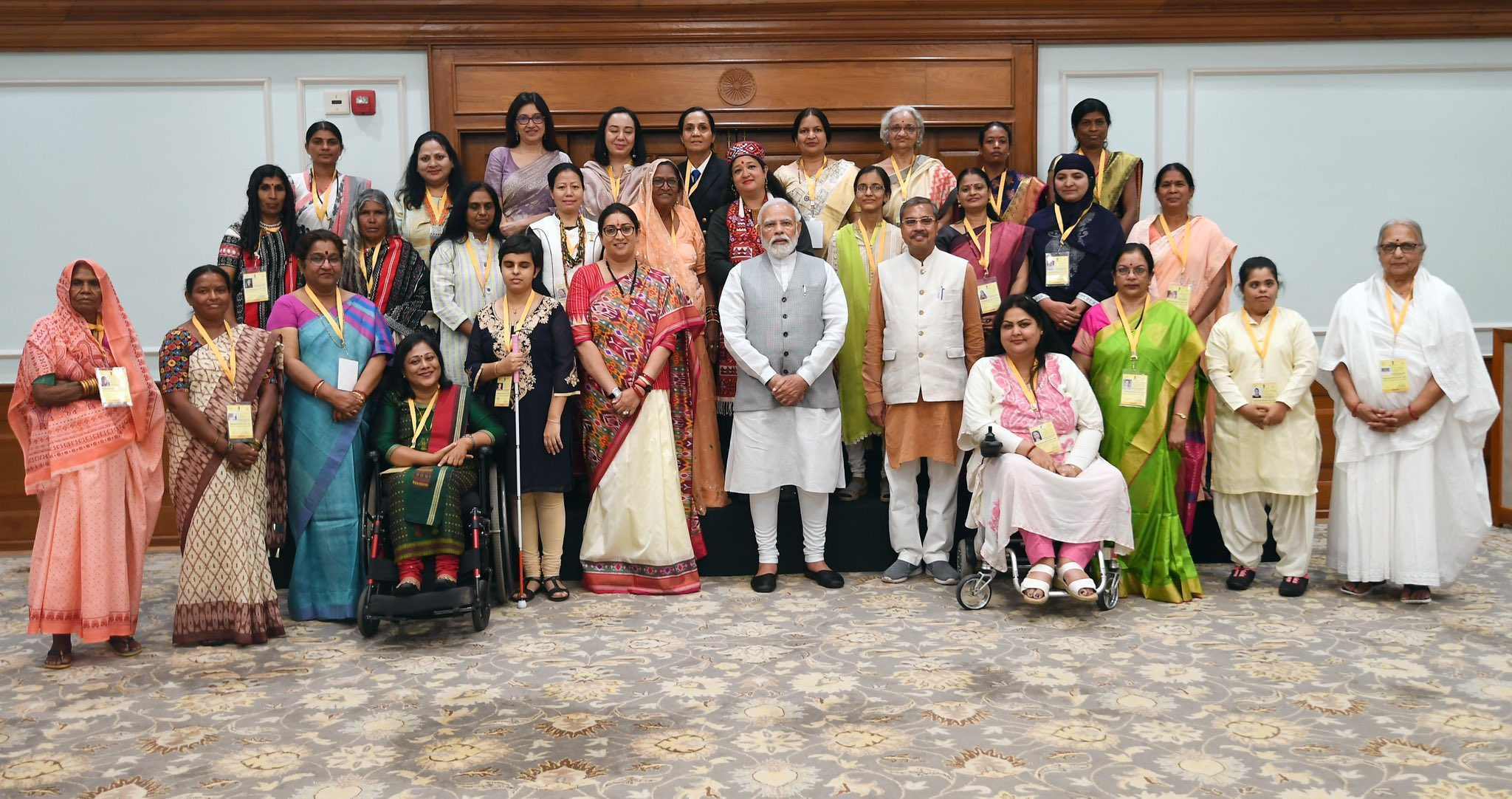
On the eve of the awards the winners met Narendra Modi

Awards given 8 March 2022.

- Sathupati Prasanna Sree
- Tage Rita Takhe
- Madhulika Ramteke
- Niranjanaben Mukulbhai Kalarthi
- Pooja Sharma
- Anshul Malhotra
- Shobha Gasti
- Radhika Menon
- Kamal Kumbhar
- Sruti Mohapatra
- Batool Begam
- Thara Rangaswamy
- Neerja Madhav
- Neena Gupta

== See also ==
- List of awards for contributions to society
- List of awards honoring women
