= Pushpa Preeya =

Indian scribe, IT professional and volunteer

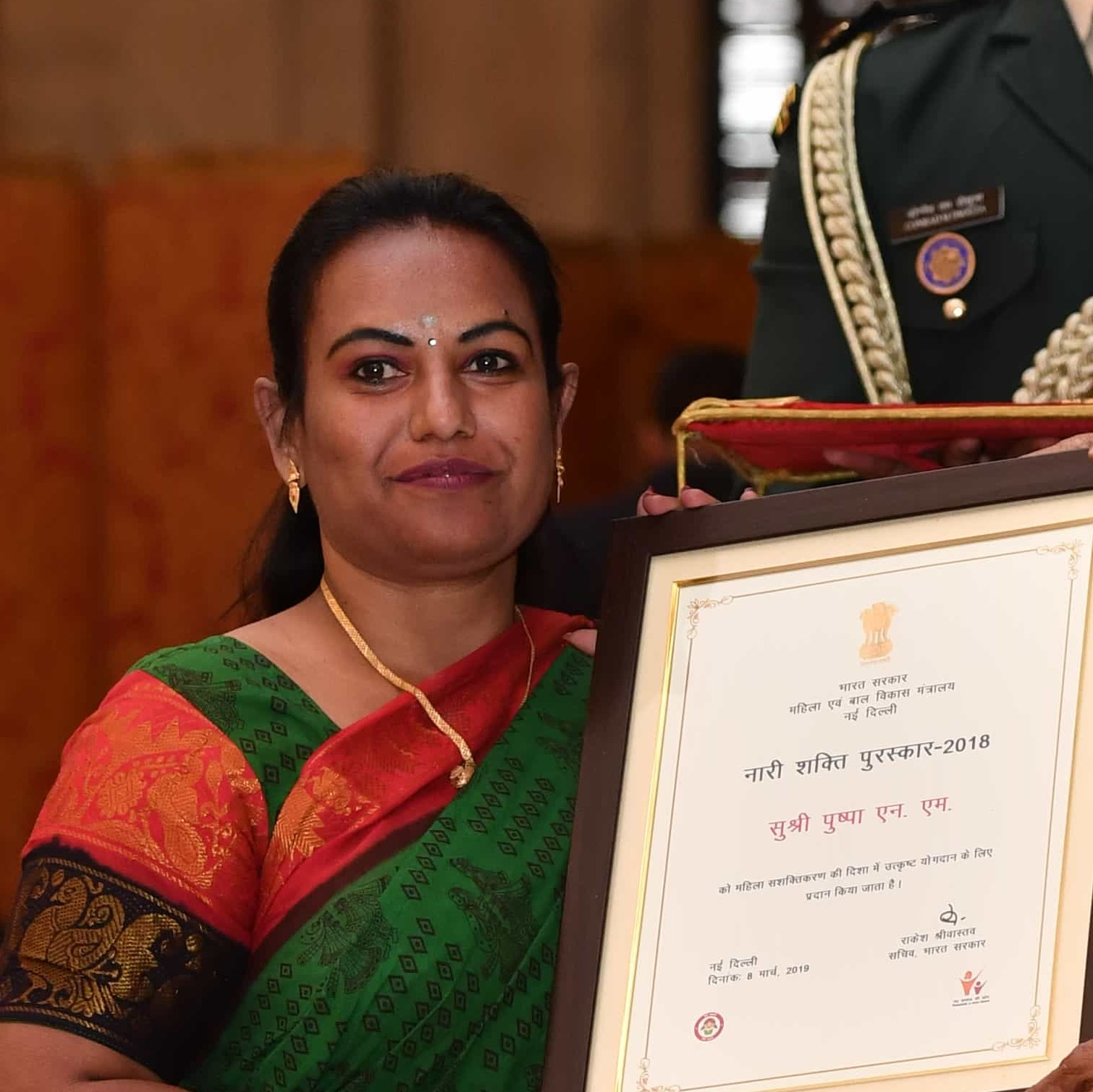
- receiving the Nari Shakti Puraskar
- Born: Pushpa Preeya; Bangaluru, Karnataka, India
- Other name: Pushpa Nagaraj
- Education: Indira Gandhi National Open University
- Occupations: scribe, IT professional
- Known for: writing exams for visually impaired people

Pushpa Preeya also known as either Pushpa NM or Pushpa N. M. is an Indian scribe, IT professional and volunteer. She is well known for her voluntary service of writing exams for visually impaired people.

== Biography ==
She was born and raised up in Bangaluru, Karnataka. She comes from a very humble background facing financial difficulties at her young age. She also revealed that she and her brother had to beat all obstacles and odds to build a life for themselves during an interview with India Times.

== Career ==
"Visually impaired people are humans too, people forget that sometimes. They have a disability in a particular part of their body, not in heart."

— Pushpa Preeya.

Pushpa pursued her career as an exam scribe in 2007 and it was one of her friends who motivated her to write exams for people with disabilities. In 2007, she responded to the request of few NGOs to write exams for blind people. She also completed diploma in computer science and pursuing her education still from the Indira Gandhi National Open University.

As of 2019, she was reported to have completed writing over 1000 exams for visually impaired people since 2007. She also maintains a Facebook blog page for blood donors. She received the Nari Shakti Puraskar for the year 2018 from the Indian President Ram Nath Kovind on 8 March 2019 coinciding with the International Women's Day.

== See also ==
- List of people from Karnataka
