= Neerja Madhav =

Indian author

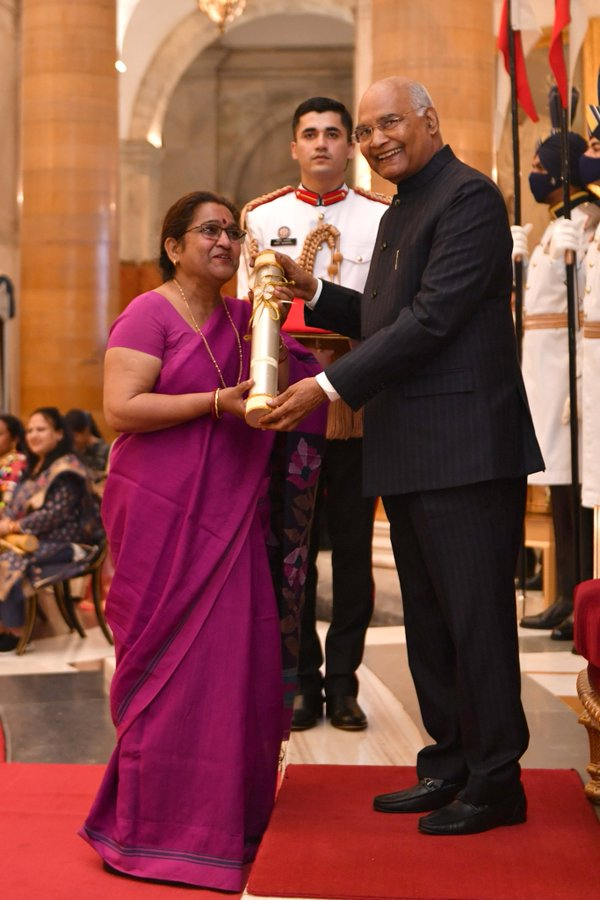
Neerja Madhav receives Nari Shakti Puraskar

Neerja Madhav is an Indian author from Uttar Pradesh, writing in Hindi. Madhav received 2021 Nari Shakti Puraskar.

== Career ==
Madhav lives in Uttar Pradesh and writes in Hindi. Her books include Yamdeep (2002), Geshe Jumpa (2006) and Diary of 5-Avarna Female Constable (2010).

The novel Yamdeep is concerned with the third gender and led Madhav to campaign for third gender rights. The Supreme Court eventually recognized the human rights of the third gender in 2014. Geshe Jumpa is about Tibetan refugees in India and is taught on the syllabus of the Central Institute of Higher Tibetan Studies in Varanasi.

Madhav was awarded the 2021 Nari Shakti Puraskar in 2022 on International Women's Day by President Ram Nath Kovind.
