= Gargi Gupta =

Indian social worker

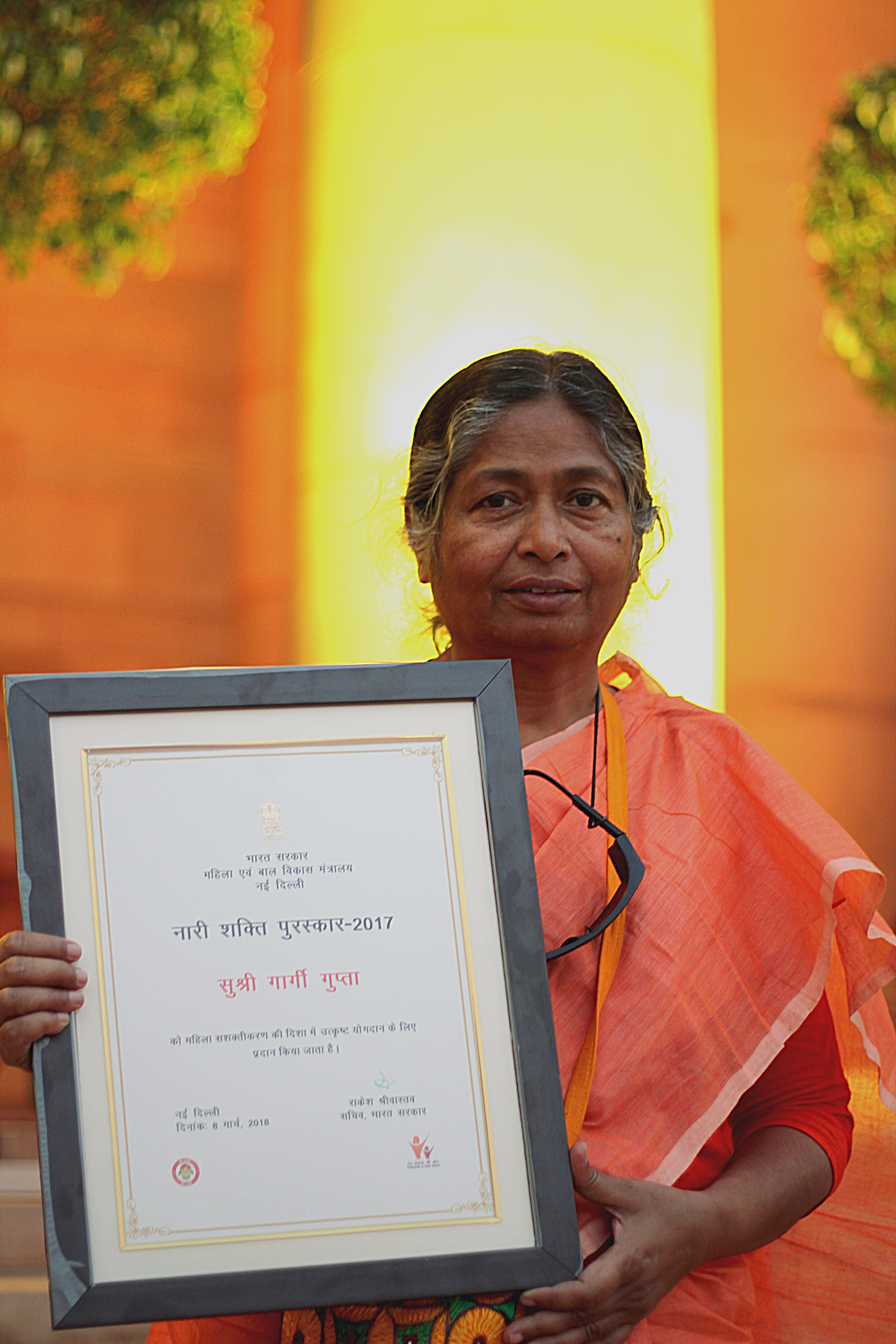
- Gargi Gupta Awardee of Nari Shakti Puraskar on 8 March 2018 at Rastrapati Bhavan
- Born: Gargi; 19 July 1961 (age 64); Kolkata, West Bengal, India
- Occupation: Social worker
- Years active: 1992–present
- Known for: Founder of Voice Of World (NGO)
- Parent(s): Prabir Gupta (father); Pranati Gupta(mother)
- Awards: Nari Shakti Puraskar
- Website: www.voiceofworld.in/members-1

Gargi Gupta is the founder and secretary of Voice Of World (NGO), a multi-unit non-profit organization for visually impaired, disabled, and orphaned children in Eastern India, headquartered in Kolkata, India.

== Life ==
Gupta was born in West Bengal. She finished her schooling at Kolkata and joined the Indian Railways. The city's street children were her first introduction to the conditions of the poor after the death of her parents.

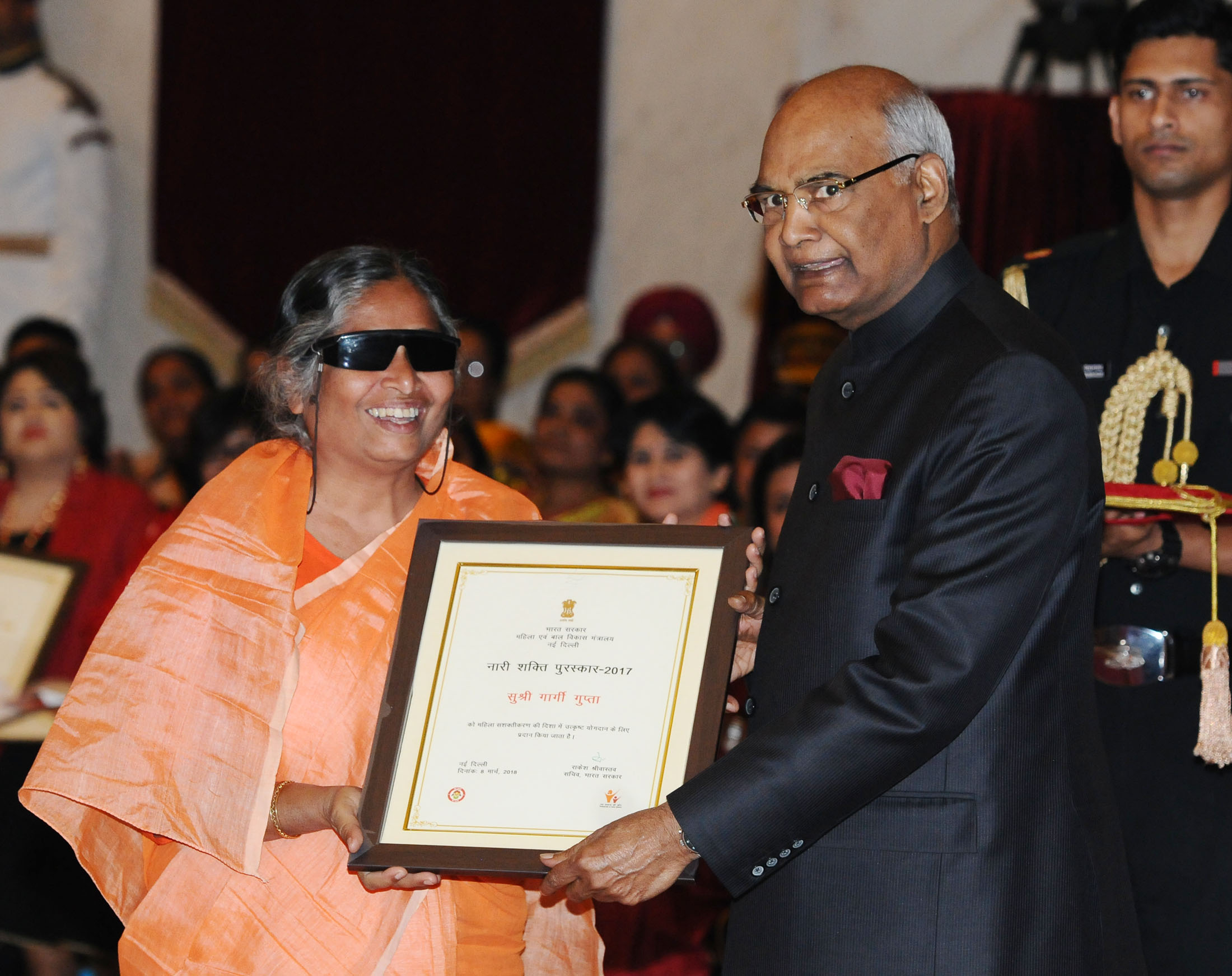
Ram Nath Kovind presenting the Nari Shakti Puruskar to Gupta

Gupta started her work with six children in her father's rented house in North Kolkata. In 2018 the number of inmates was 300. It is the only privately run facility of its kind. Voice of World started its South Kolkata Centre in 1998 in another house of Prabir Gupta. Residential Kindergarten School, Braille Press and the library is located there.

In recognition of her services, Indian President Ramnath Kovind awarded Gupta with the Nari Shakti (women empowerment) award on 8 March 2018.

== The charity ==
Voice Of World's inmates are orphan or from under-privileged families. Along with their free education they experience various sports including mountaineering and trekking. In 2018 she introduced coastal trek for disabled inmates. After completion of education of inmates, she and her NGO take care of rehabilitation of inmates, especially visually disabled girls.

== Major works ==
- 1992 She founded 'Voice of World' NGO which works for visually impaired and disabled orphaned children in Eastern India.
- 1997 Started residential facility for 300 residential and 3000 non residential beneficiaries.
- 2001 developed transliteration software to transfer Bengali word documents in to Braille.
- Set up a home in Rishra for visually disabled women pursuing Higher Education
- Her NGO runs a Teachers training college where disabled students get scholarship

== Awards and honours ==
- 8 March 2018: Nari Shakti Puraskar (Women Power Award), highest civilian award for women in India.
