= Kalyani Pramod Balakrishnan =

Indian textile designer

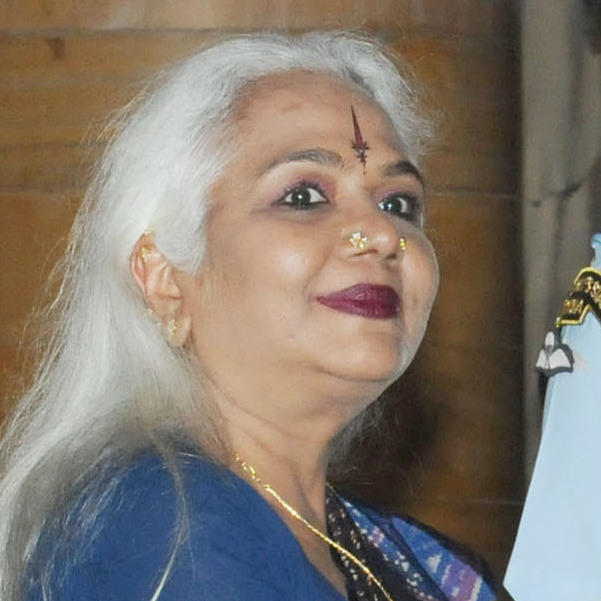
- Balakrishnan receiving the Nari Shakti Puraskar
- Occupation: Textile designer

Kalyani Pramod Balakrishnan is an Indian textile designer based in Chennai in Tamil Nadu. She has worked with weavers through the Ministry of Rural Development. She received the 2016 Nari Shakti Puraskar.

== Early life ==
Kalyani Pramod Balakrishnan grew up in Chennai, the capital of the state of Tamil Nadu. She studied textile design at the National Institute of Design and then set up a boutique shop. In 1995, she made a quilt called 'Survival in daily life' which was later exhibited at an exhibition in Ireland.

== Career ==
Balakrishnan worked with 19,500 weavers from thirteen districts of Tamil Nadu during six years at the Ministry of Rural Development. She then began to help people with autism or cerebral palsy to learn to weave. In recognition of her work, she received the 2016 Nari Shakti Puraskar from President of India Pranab Mukherjee.
