= Jim van Os =

Dutch psychiatrist and epidemiologist

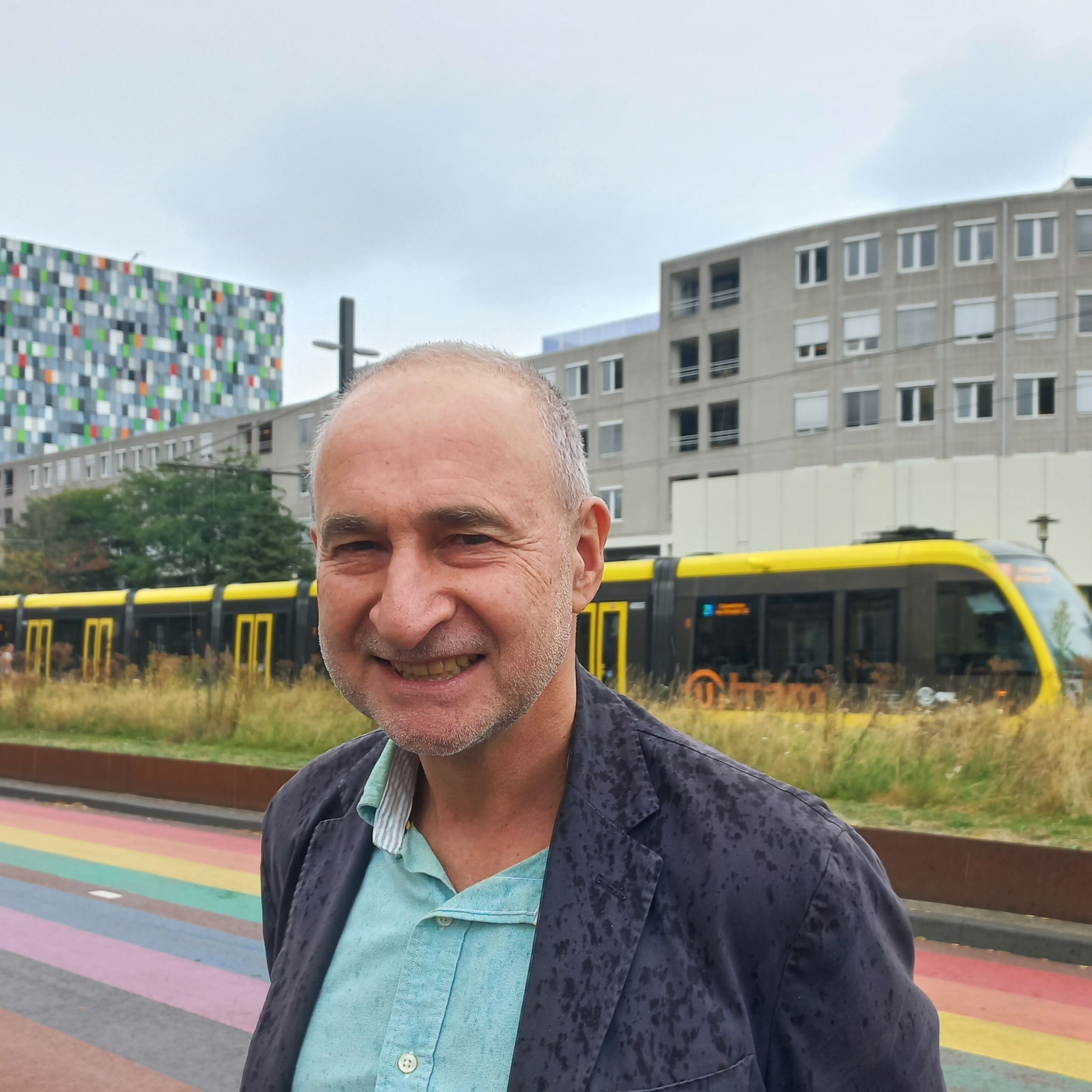
Jim van Os, Utrecht Science Park (2024)

Jim van Os (born 1960) is a Dutch academic and psychiatrist. He is Professor of Psychiatry at Utrecht University and medical manager of the Brain Center at UMC Utrecht, the Netherlands.

== Career ==
Van Os studied medicine in Amsterdam, psychiatry in Jakarta, Casablanca, Bordeaux, and London, and subsequently epidemiology at the London School of Hygiene and Tropical Medicine.

He was formerly Professor of Psychiatry, Chair of the Department of Psychiatry and Psychology, and Director of Psychiatric Services at the Maastricht University Medical Center. He is currently Professor of Psychiatry with a focus on psychiatric epidemiology and public mental health and medical manager of the Brain Center at Utrecht University Medical Centre, as well as visiting professor and fellow at the Institute of Psychiatry, King's College London, United Kingdom.

In 2011 he was elected a member of the Royal Netherlands Academy of Arts and Sciences, and in 2023, of the Koninklijke Hollandsche Maatschappij der Wetenschappen. Since 2014 he has been listed in the Thomson Reuters Web of Science list of "the world's most influential scientific minds of our time". He is on the editorial board of several major psychiatric journals, including Acta Psychiatrica Scandinavica, European Psychiatry, Psychological Medicine, Schizophrenia Research, and Schizophrenia Bulletin, additionally serving as an academic editor for PLOS One. He also served on the psychosis group for the DSM-5 Task Force. His colleagues have voted him "best psychiatrist in the Netherlands" multiple times. In 2023 Van Os received the Lifetime Achievement Award of the Schizophrenia International Research Society.

== Arguments to abandon the diagnosis of schizophrenia in favor of a "psychosis spectrum" ==
In 2009, Van Os proposed the retirement of the diagnosis, schizophrenia, citing its lack of validity and the risk of fundamental attribution error associated with the label. The label "schizophrenia" could cause difficulties on the clinician's part in communicating with the diagnosed person, due to erroneous preconceptions associated with the label.

In its place, Van Os proposed a broad and general syndromal definition, more suited to personal diagnosis, which would reduce attribution error. He cited previous work by other researchers that explains psychosis as aberrant salience regulation.

In 2014 he explained his views in a TED talk.

In 2015 he co-authored an article in a national newspaper, suggesting that "schizo-labels" be abandoned and replaced with more scientific and patient-friendly terminology. The following week, his colleagues Rene Kahn, Iris Sommer, and Damiaan Denys published a counter-article, labeling Van Os and his colleagues as "antipsychiatrists".

In 2016 he published an editorial in the BMJ arguing that disease classifications should drop the concept of schizophrenia, as it is an unhelpful description of symptoms. This was followed by an article in 2018 in Psychological Medicine, describing the slow death of the concept of schizophrenia and the painful birth of the psychosis spectrum, and a related 2021 article in Frontiers in Psychiatry on the waiting for the Funeral of "Schizophrenia" and the Baby Shower of the Psychosis Spectrum.

In 2021, he argued, in an article in Schizophrenia Research, that the term "Schizophrenia" can be seen as a symptom of psychiatry's reluctance to enter the moral era of medicine.

Since 2020, Van Os, together with colleague Prof. Philippe Delespaul, has been working on setting up social trials in the context of mental health service transformation according to the principle of a Mental Health Ecosystem, as described in the book We zijn God niet, which he wrote together with Myrrhe van Spronsen, and the book Kopzorgen. Psychose begrijpen in 33 vragen, which he wrote with Stijn Vanheule.

== Partial bibliography ==
- Van Os, J.; Kapur, S. (2009). "Schizophrenia". Lancet. 374 (9690): 635–645. doi:10.1016/s0140-6736(09)60995-8. PMID 19700006. S2CID 208792724.
- Van Os, J; Kenis, G; Rutten, BP (2010). "The environment and schizophrenia". Nature. 468 (7321): 203–212. Bibcode:2010Natur.468..203V. doi:10.1038/nature09563. PMID 21068828. S2CID 4410308.
- McGorry, P; Van Os, J (2013). "Redeeming diagnosis in psychiatry. Timing versus specificity". Lancet. 381 (9863): 343–345. doi:10.1016/s0140-6736(12)61268-9. PMID 23351805. S2CID 29808038.
- Van Os, J (2009). "'Salience syndrome' replaces 'schizophrenia' in DSM-V and ICD-11: psychiatry's evidence-based entry into the 21st century?". Acta Psychiatrica Scandinavica. 120 (5): 363–372. doi:10.1111/j.1600-0447.2009.01456.x. PMID 19807717. S2CID 205803418.
- Van Os, J.; Linscott, R.J.; Myin-Germeys, I.; Delespaul, P.; Krabbendam, L. (2009). "A systematic review and meta-analysis of the psychosis continuum: evidence for a psychosis proneness-persistence-impairment model of psychotic disorder". Psychological Medicine. 39 (2): 179–195. doi:10.1017/s0033291708003814. PMID 18606047. S2CID 10102240.
- Tamminga, C., Sirovatka, P., Regier, D.A. & Van Os, J. (2010) Deconstructing Psychosis: Refining the Research Agenda for DSM-V (Arlington, Virginia, American Psychiatric Association).
- Groot, P.C. & Van Os, J. (2021) "Tapering Medication (Tapering Strips) as a Necessary Tool for a Meaningful Conversation in the Doctor's Office" (pp. 259–285). In: P. Lehmann & C. Newnes (eds.), Withdrawal from Prescribed Psychotropic Drugs. ISBN 978-3-925931-83-3, ISBN 978-3-925931-84-0, ISBN 978-0-9545428-8-7. Berlin / Lancaster: Peter Lehmann Publishing.
- Van Os J, Guloksuz S, Vijn TW, Hafkenscheid A, Delespaul P. The evidence-based group-level symptom-reduction model as the organizing principle for mental health care: time for change? World Psychiatry. 2019;18:88-96.
