= René Kahn =

Dutch psychiatrist

René Sylvain Kahn
- Born: June 18, 1954 (age 72)
- Citizenship: Netherlands
- Education: University Groningen, University Hospital Utrecht, Academisch Medisch Centrum, Montefiore Hospital, Albert Einstein College of Medicine, Mount Sinai Hospital
- Years active: 1972–1984 (training); 1985–Present (practice)
- Medical career
- Profession: Neuropsychiatrist, researcher, professor
- Institutions: Icahn School of Medicine at Mount Sinai
- Research: Psychiatry, schizophrenia

René Sylvain Kahn (born 1954) is a neuropsychiatrist and the Esther and Joseph Klingenstein Professor and System Chair of Psychiatry at the Icahn School of Medicine at Mount Sinai in the United States, a position he has held since 2017. He previously served as Professor of Psychiatry and Director of the Brain Center Rudolf Magnus at the University Medical Center Utrecht in the Netherlands. Kahn is recognized for his research on the neurobiology of schizophrenia. He served as a former president of the Schizophrenia International Research Society and was elected to the Royal Netherlands Academy of Arts and Sciences in 2009. He received the Neuropsychopharmacology Award from the European College of Neuropsychopharmacology in 2014.

He was awarded a knighthood in the Order of the Netherlands Lion in 2018. As of 2020, he was principal or co-principal investigator of more than 40 grants, written 39 books and book chapters and published more than 1000 peer-reviewed articles.

== Biography ==
Kahn studied medicine from 1972 to 1979 at the University of Groningen, and then specialized in psychiatry and neurology at the University of Utrecht and the Academic Medical Center, respectively. He is a registered neuropsychiatrist since 1986. In 1990 he obtained his Ph.D. with professors Herman van Praag and David de Wied as mentors at the University of Utrecht on the thesis Serotonin Receptor Hypersensitivity in Panic Disorder: an Hypothesis.

Kahn served in the Royal Netherlands Army as a first lieutenant in 1980 and 1981.

Following residencies in the Netherlands, he attended the Albert Einstein College of Medicine in New York City for a research fellowship in biological psychiatry. From there he completed psychiatry residencies at Mount Sinai Hospital and then acted as the chief of the psychiatry research unit at the Bronx VA Hospital. In 1993 he returned to the Netherlands be the chair of psychiatry at the University Medical Center. He led the Brain Center Rudolf Magnus—a multi-discipline center for research in fundamental neuroscience, psychiatry, neurology, neurosurgery and rehabilitation medicine—for over 10 years, until 2017.

== Honors and awards ==
- Fulbright Scholarship (1985)
- Chairman of the Dutch Association for Psychiatry (2003–2006)
- Treasurer and Vice-President of the European College of Neuropsychopharmacology (2002–2007)
- Honorary Lifetime Professor at Jilin University in Changchun, China (2010)
- ECNP Neuropsychopharmacology Award (2014)
- Honorary doctorate at Semmelweis University in Budapest, Hungary (2014)
- Lifetime achievement award of the Netherlands Psychiatric Association (2016)
- President of The Schizophrenia International Research Society (2014–2016)
- Fellow, American College of Neuropsychopharmacology
- Member of the Royal Netherlands Academy of Arts and Sciences (2009)
- Knight in the Order of the Netherlands Lion (2018)

== Research ==
Kahn studies biological causes of psychiatric disorders such as schizophrenia and has led numerous consortia examining the brain changes that play a role in schizophrenia. He has coordinated several international trials to optimize the treatment of schizophrenia.

He is known for helping establish proof that schizophrenia debuts with cognitive dysfunction, preceding the onset of the first incidence of psychosis by more than a decade. He and associates further showed that brain volume is one of the most heritable characteristics, paving the way to link brain volumes in health and disease to genetic variation.

=== Grants and trials ===
As of 2020, Kahn is the principal investigator or co-principal investigator on 13 active grants related to child development and drug augmentation for onset schizophrenia to prevent psychosis and cognitive therapy symptoms.

Active grant in 2020:

Grants, Contracts and Foundation Sources
Title and No.	Role	Duration
Stanley Foundation. Prednisolone augmentation for patients with recent onset schizophrenia	PI	2013-2020
Stanley Foundation. Simvastatin augmentation for recent onset schizophrenia	PI	2013-2020
EudraCT 2015-003503-39 Stanley Foundation. Omega fatty aids Trial in Ultra High Risk subjects	PI	2017-2020
NIH/NIMH (1T32MH122394-01) Training the Next Generation of Clinical Neuroscientists	PI	2020-2024
NIH/NIMH (1U24MH124629-01) Psychosis Risk Evaluation, Data Integration and Computational Technologies	PI	2020-2024

== Publications ==
=== Editorial ===
As of 2020, Kahn is on the editorial board of Schizophrenia Research, European Neuropsychopharmacology, Schizophrenia Bulletin and Early Intervention in Psychosis.

=== Peer reviewed articles ===
Kahn authored or co-authored over 1000 scientific papers with an H index, Thomson Reuters: 128; cites: > 73,500 and an H index, Google Scholar: 195; cites: > 165,000.

Partial list:

- Sher, L; Kahn, RS (2019). "Suicide in Schizophrenia: An Educational Overview". Medicina (Kaunas). 55 (7): 361. doi:10.3390/medicina55070361. PMC 6681260. PMID 31295938.
- Böttcher, C; Schlickeiser, S; Sneeboer, MAM; Kunkel, D; Knop, A; Paza, E; Fidzinski, P; Kraus, L; Snijders, GJL; Kahn, RS; Schulz, AR; Mei, HE; Hol, EM; Siegmund, B; Glauben, R; Spruth, EJ; de Witte, LD; Priller, J (2019). "Human microglia regional heterogeneity and phenotypes determined by multiplexed single-cell mass cytometry". Nat Neurosci. 22 (1): 78–90. doi:10.1038/s41593-018-0290-2. PMID 30559476..
- Turk, E; van den Heuvel, MI; Benders, MJ; de Heus, R; Franx, A; Manning, JH; Hect, JL; Hernandez-Andrade, E; Hassan, SS; Romero, R; Kahn, RS; Thomason, ME; van den Heuvel, MP (2019). "Functional Connectome of the Fetal Brain". J Neurosci. 39 (49): 9716–9724. doi:10.1523/JNEUROSCI.2891-18.2019. PMC 6891066. PMID 31685648.
- Hess, JL; Tylee, DS; Mattheisen, M; Børglum, AD; Als, TD; Grove, J; Werge, T; Mortensen, PB; Mors, O; Nordentoft, M; Hougaard, DM; Byberg-Grauholm, J; Bækvad-Hansen, M; Greenwood, TA; Tsuang, MT; Curtis, D; Steinberg, S; Sigurdsson, E; Stefánsson, H; Stefánsson, K; Edenberg, HJ; Holmans, P; Faraone, SV; Glatt, SJ (2021). "A polygenic resilience score moderates the genetic risk for schizophrenia". Mol Psychiatry. 26 (3): 800–815. doi:10.1038/s41380-019-0463-8. PMC 7058518. PMID 31492941.
- Kahn, RS (2020). "On the Origins of Schizophrenia". Am J Psychiatry. 177 (4): 291–297. doi:10.1176/appi.ajp.2020.20020147. PMID 32233682..
- Ormel, PR; Vieira; de Sá, R; van Bodegraven, EJ; Karst, H; Harschnitz, O; Sneeboer, MAM; Johansen, LE; van Dijk, RE; Scheefhals, N; Berdenis; van Berlekom, A; Ribes Martínez, E; Kling, S; MacGillavry, HD; van den Berg, LH; Kahn, RS; Hol, EM; de Witte, LD; Pasterkamp, RJ (2018). "Microglia innately develop within cerebral organoids". Nat Commun. 9 (1) 4167. Bibcode:2018NatCo...9.4167O. doi:10.1038/s41467-018-06684-2. PMC 6177485. PMID 30301888.
- Ruderfer, Douglas M.; et al. (2018). "Genomic Dissection of Bipolar Disorder and Schizophrenia, Including 28 Subphenotypes". Cell. 173 (7): 1705–1715.e16. doi:10.1016/j.cell.2018.05.046. PMC 6432650. PMID 29906448.
- Böttcher, C; Schlickeiser, S; Sneeboer, MAM; Kunkel, D; Knop, A; Paza, E; Fidzinski, P; Kraus, L; Snijders, GJL; Kahn, RS; Schulz, AR; Mei, HE; Hol, EM; Siegmund, B; Glauben, R; Spruth, EJ; de Witte, LD; Priller, J (2019). "Human microglia regional heterogeneity and phenotypes determined by multiplexed single-cell mass cytometry". Nat Neurosci. 22 (1): 78–90. doi:10.1038/s41593-018-0290-2. PMID 30559476..
- Böttcher, C; Schlickeiser, S; Sneeboer, MAM; Kunkel, D; Knop, A; Paza, E; Fidzinski, P; Kraus, L; Snijders, GJL; Kahn, RS; Schulz, AR; Mei, HE; Hol, EM; Siegmund, B; Glauben, R; Spruth, EJ; de Witte, LD; Priller, J (2019). "Human microglia regional heterogeneity and phenotypes determined by multiplexed single-cell mass cytometry". Nat Neurosci. 22 (1): 78–90. doi:10.1038/s41593-018-0290-2. PMID 30559476..
- Schür, RR; van Leeuwen, JMC; Houtepen, LC; Joëls, M; Kahn, RS; Boks, MP; Vinkers, CH (2018). "Glucocorticoid receptor exon 1(F) methylation and the cortisol stress response in health and disease". Psychoneuroendocrinology. 97: 182–189. doi:10.1016/j.psyneuen.2018.07.018. hdl:1983/e2a3e409-2610-4343-aed6-4c81a98977c6. PMID 30036796..

=== Books and chapters ===
Partial list:

- Kahn RS. De appel en de Boom. Uitgeverij Balans, Amsterdam 2011. ISBN 9789460032950 (3 editions)
- Kahn RS. In de spreekkamer van de psychiater. Uitgeverij Balans, Amsterdam 2008. ISBN 9789050188814, NUR 875 (6 printings)
- Kahn RS. Onze Hersenen., Over de smalle grens tussen normaal en abnormaal. Uitgeverij Balans, Amsterdam 2006, 2007, 2008. ISBN 9050187129, NUR 875 (12 printings)
- De Haan L, Kahn RS. Psychotische stoornissen. In: Leerboek Psychiatrie (Hengeveld, van Balkom eds). De Tijdstroom uitgeverij, 2005. ISBN 9058980766 / 5898 094 4, NUR 875
