= Thara Rangaswamy =

Indian psychiatrist and schizophrenia researcher

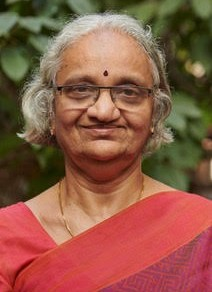
- Born: May 25, 1953 (age 72); Chennai, India
- Occupation: Doctor
- Spouse: P. Srinivasan

Thara Rangaswamy (born 25 May 1953) is a psychiatrist in India, the co-founder of an NGO called SCARF (Schizophrenia Research Foundation) based in Chennai, India. She is a researcher in schizophrenia and community mental health. In 2020, she received the SIRS Outstanding Clinical and Community Research Award of SIRS (Schizophrenia International Research Society), an apex body for work on schizophrenia in Florence, Italy.

== Education ==
Rangaswamy completed her undergraduate medicine at Kilpauk Medical College and post graduate in psychiatry from Madras Medical College. Her PhD on Disability in Schizophrenia was from the University of Madras in 1985. She received the Hon Fellowship in Psychiatry from the Royal College of Psychiatrists, UK.

== Career ==
Rangaswamy started her work as a senior research officer in the study sponsored by the Indian Council of Medical Research “Factors affecting course and outcome of schizophrenia“ at the Department of Psychiatry, Madras Medical College.

In 1984, she cofounded an NGO Schizophrenia Research Foundation (SCARF) at Chennai, India along with Sarada Menon and S.Rajkumar. Between 1988 and 1990, she was awarded the Ashoka Fellowship for work in community mental health.

In 1990, she joined SCARF as a full time psychiatrist and was the Director from 1996-2018. She is now the Vice Chairman of the Board of SCARF and the Chair of all research and dementia related activities.

== Research ==
Rangaswamy’s main research interests are in course and outcome of schizophrenia, disability, community mental health, youth mental health and dementia. Her Madras Longitudinal Study which has followed up persons with first episode schizophrenia for 35 years is one of its kind in the world. She has published 160 scientific papers, written over 10 chapters in books of psychiatry and edited two books.

She has been the Principal Investigator of 28 research projects including WHO field trials. Ten international projects have named her as CO-PI. Some of the well known studies are COPSI, INTREPID and the genetic study with the University of Queensland.

She is on the editorial committee of several journals including the Schizophrenia Bulletin and Social Psychiatry and Psychiatric Epidemiology.

== Awards and honours ==
2026: Received the national Gayatri Jaipuria award for health care excellence of women 2026: Received the Devi award from the Express group of publications

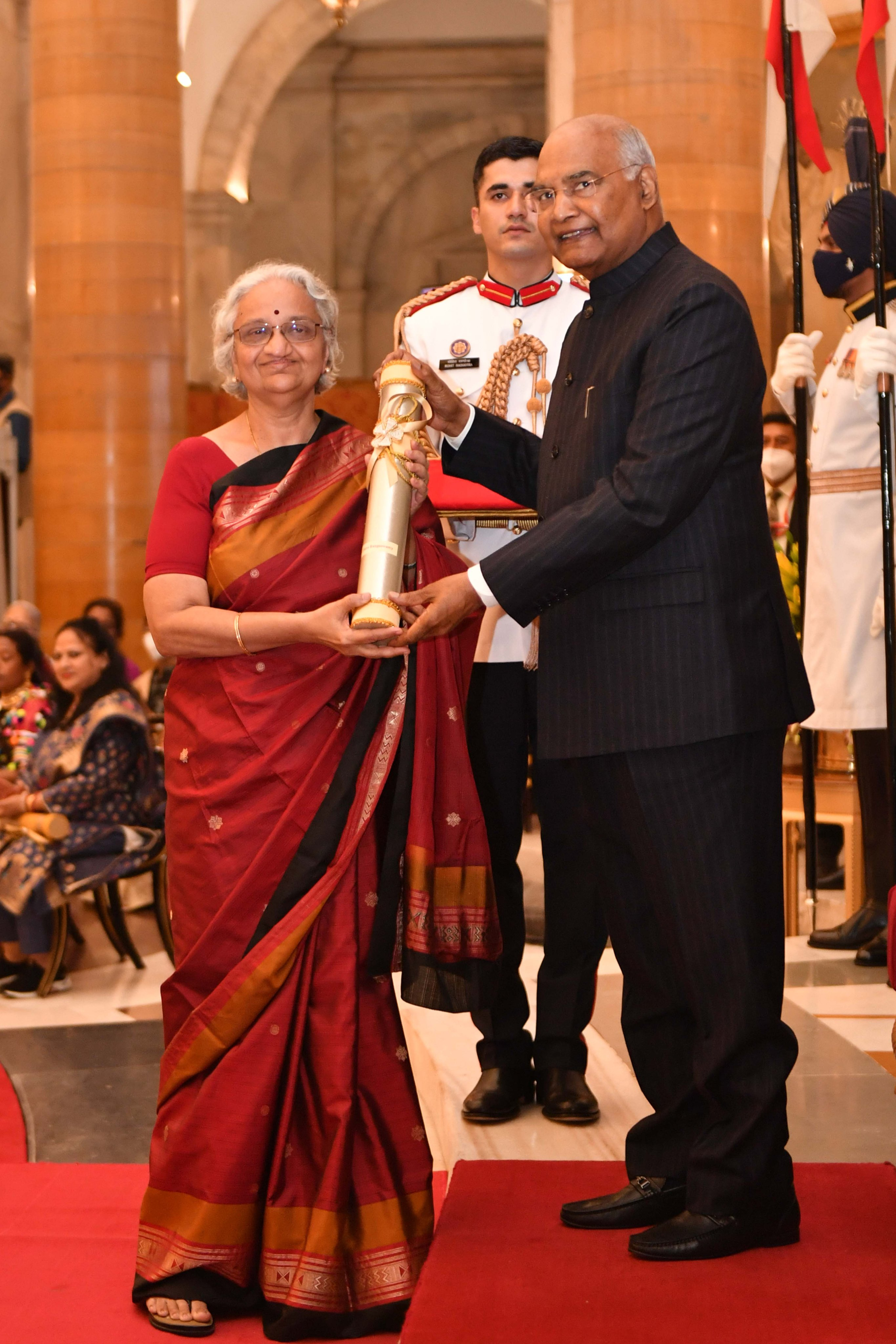
Nari Shakti Puraskar to Rangaswamy on 8 March 2022

- 2022 Nari Shakti Puraskar for "creating awareness about mental disorders".
- 2020 SIRS Outstanding Clinical and Community Research Award of SIRS (Schizophrenia International Research Society), an apex body for work on schizophrenia at Florence, Italy.
- Ashok Pai Memorial Mansa National Awarded for her contribution to Mental Health, 2019.
- HINDU award for excellence] in health care from Dr.Kiran Bedi, 2018
- Andrea Delgado Award for Outstanding Contribution to Psychiatry from the Association of Black Psychiatrists of America, Nov.2017
- President’s Gold Medal from the Royal College of Psychiatry, 2010 and Hon. Fellowship of the Royal College of Psychiatrists, UK, 2014
