= Paolo Fusar-Poli =

Italian medical doctor and psychiatrist

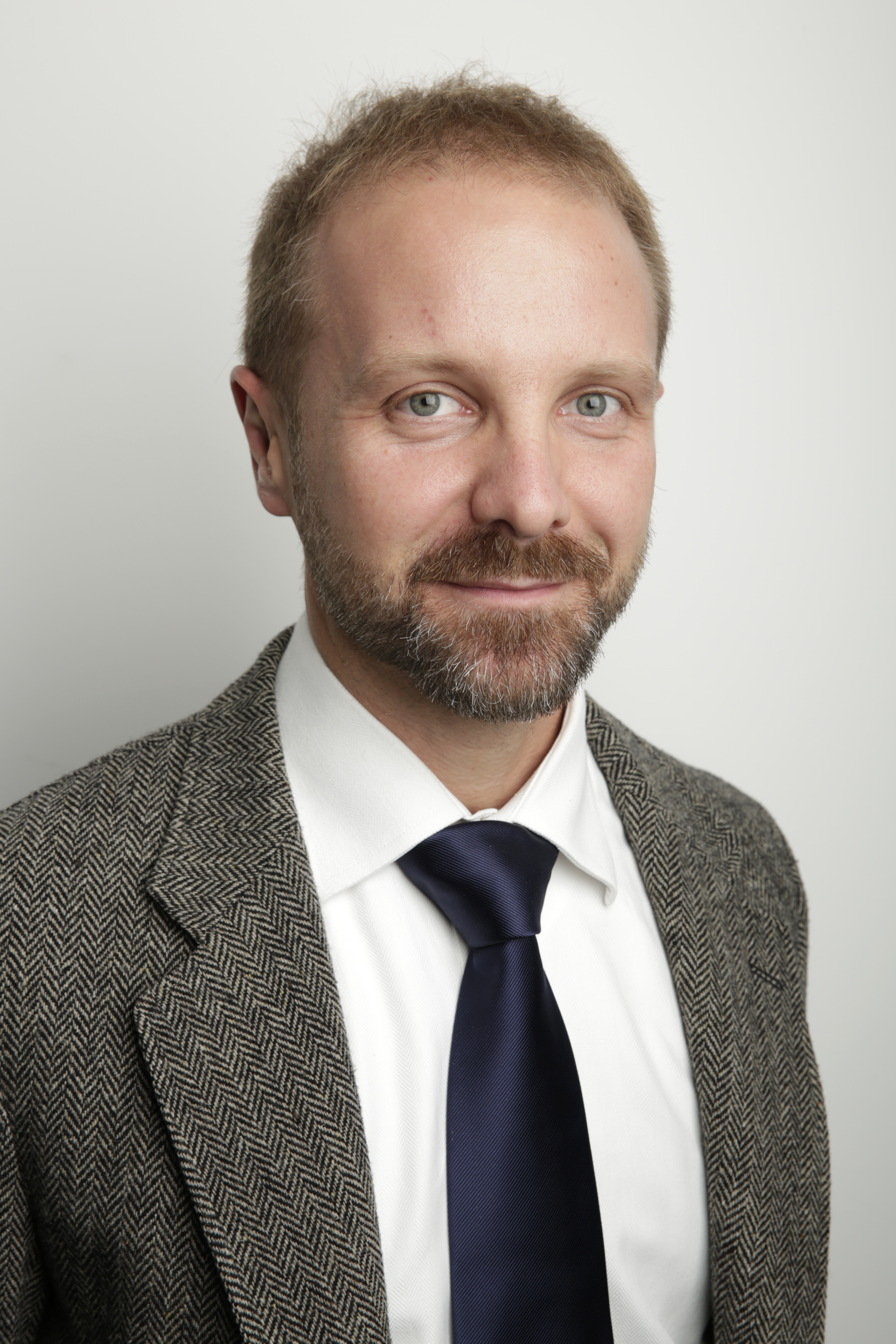
- Dr. Paolo Fusar-Poli at King's College London
- Born: May 27, 1977 (age 49); Cremona, Italy
- Education: University of Pavia
- Occupations: Medical Doctor, Psychiatrist, Clinical Academic
- Medical career
- Field: Psychiatry

Paolo Fusar-Poli (born May 27, 1977) is an Italian and British medical doctor, psychiatrist, and Professor at the Institute of Psychiatry, Psychology and Neuroscience, King's College, London and at the Department of Brain and Behavioral Sciences, University of Pavia.

== Early life and education ==
Paolo Fusar-Poli was born on May 27, 1977, in Cremona, Italy. He graduated as Medical Doctor in 2002, in Psychiatry in 2006, and obtained a Ph.D. in 2009, all from the University of Pavia.

== Career and research ==
Dr. Fusar-Poli during his early career worked as consultant psychiatrist and junior researcher across Italy and the UK. In 2012, King's College London (KCL) awarded him a tenured position and he was granted the Specialist Associateship of the Royal College of Psychiatrists. He has been working with the Outreach Support at South London (OASIS) at South London and Maudsley NHS Foundation Trust as an honorary consultant psychiatrist since 2012.

He is Professor and Chair of Preventive Psychiatry at KCL, Associate Professor at the University of Pavia, Head of the Head of Early Psychosis: Intervention and Clinical-detection (EPIC) lab, Academic Lead of the Early Psychosis Workstream of the National Institute for Health Research (NIHR) Mental Health Translational Research Collaborative, Chair of the European College of Neuropsychopharmacology Network for the Prevention of Mental Disorders and Mental Health Promotion, and Section Coordinator of the Italian Medical Society of Great Britain.

He is affiliated with the Schizophrenia Bulletin as an Associate Editor and formerly as a Section Editor for the Journal of Neurology, Psychiatry, and Brain Research. He also served as an expert advisor for the Diagnostic and Statistical Manual for Mental Disorders.

His research focuses primarily on the early detection and prevention of severe mental disorders such as psychosis or schizophrenia in young people. He is the author of over 500 scientific and medical publications.

=== Truman syndrome ===
Dr. Fusar-Poli has also performed research on Truman syndrome, with its symptoms are found before and during the onset of severe mental disorders such as psychosis and schizophrenia. He has suggested that the "Truman explanation" is a result of the patients' search for meaning in their perception that the ordinary world has changed in some significant but inexplicable way.

== Major publications ==
Major publications by Fusar-Poli:

- Fusar-Poli P, Estradé A, Stanghellini G, Venables J, Onwumere J, Messas G, Gilardi L, Nelson B, Patel V, Bonoldi I, Aragona M, Cabrera A, Rico J, Hoque A, Otaiku J, Hunter N, Tamelini MG, Maschião LF, Puchivailo MC, Piedade VL, Kéri P, Kpodo L, Sunkel C, Bao J, Shiers D, Kuipers E, Arango C, Maj M (June 2022). "The lived experience of psychosis: a bottom-up review co-written by experts by experience and academics". World Psychiatry. 21 (2): 168–188. doi:10.1002/wps.20959. PMC 9077608. PMID 35524616.
- Fusar-Poli P, Placentino A, Carletti F, Landi P, Allen P, Surguladze S, Benedetti F, Abbamonte M, Gasparotti R, Barale F, Perez J, McGuire P, Politi P (November 2009). "Functional atlas of emotional faces processing: a voxel-based meta-analysis of 105 functional magnetic resonance imaging studies". Journal of Psychiatry & Neuroscience. 34 (6): 418–32. PMC 2783433. PMID 19949718.
- Fusar-Poli P, Bonoldi I, Yung AR, Borgwardt S, Kempton MJ, Valmaggia L, Barale F, Caverzasi E, McGuire P (March 2012). "Predicting psychosis: meta-analysis of transition outcomes in individuals at high clinical risk". Archives of General Psychiatry. 69 (3): 220–9. doi:10.1001/archgenpsychiatry.2011.1472. PMID 22393215.
- Fusar-Poli P, Bonoldi I, Yung AR, Borgwardt S, Kempton MJ, Valmaggia L, Barale F, Caverzasi E, McGuire P (March 2012). "Predicting psychosis: meta-analysis of transition outcomes in individuals at high clinical risk". Archives of General Psychiatry. 69 (3): 220–9. doi:10.1001/archgenpsychiatry.2011.1472. PMID 22393215.
- Bhattacharyya S, Morrison PD, Fusar-Poli P, Martin-Santos R, Borgwardt S, Winton-Brown T, Nosarti C, O' Carroll CM, Seal M, Allen P, Mehta MA, Stone JM, Tunstall N, Giampietro V, Kapur S, Murray RM, Zuardi AW, Crippa JA, Atakan Z, McGuire PK (February 2010). "Opposite effects of delta-9-tetrahydrocannabinol and cannabidiol on human brain function and psychopathology". Neuropsychopharmacology. 35 (3): 764–74. doi:10.1038/npp.2009.184. PMC 3055598. PMID 19924114.
- Fusar-Poli P, Crippa JA, Bhattacharyya S, Borgwardt SJ, Allen P, Martin-Santos R, Seal M, Surguladze SA, O'Carrol C, Atakan Z, Zuardi AW, McGuire PK (January 2009). "Distinct effects of {delta}9-tetrahydrocannabinol and cannabidiol on neural activation during emotional processing". Archives of General Psychiatry. 66 (1): 95–105. doi:10.1001/archgenpsychiatry.2008.519. PMID 19124693.
- Fusar-Poli P, Perez J, Broome M, Borgwardt S, Placentino A, Caverzasi E, Cortesi M, Veggiotti P, Politi P, Barale F, McGuire P (2007). "Neurofunctional correlates of vulnerability to psychosis: a systematic review and meta-analysis". Neuroscience and Biobehavioral Reviews. 31 (4): 465–84. doi:10.1016/j.neubiorev.2006.11.006. PMID 17223194. S2CID 25429610.
- Crippa JA, Zuardi AW, Martín-Santos R, Bhattacharyya S, Atakan Z, McGuire P, Fusar-Poli P (October 2009). "Cannabis and anxiety: a critical review of the evidence". Human Psychopharmacology. 24 (7): 515–23. doi:10.1002/hup.1048. PMID 19693792. S2CID 13544234.
- Fusar-Poli P, Borgwardt S, Crescini A, Deste G, Kempton MJ, Lawrie S, Mc Guire P, Sacchetti E (April 2011). "Neuroanatomy of vulnerability to psychosis: a voxel-based meta-analysis". Neuroscience and Biobehavioral Reviews. 35 (5): 1175–85. doi:10.1016/j.neubiorev.2010.12.005. PMID 21168439. S2CID 20518258.
- Smieskova R, Fusar-Poli P, Allen P, Bendfeldt K, Stieglitz RD, Drewe J, Radue EW, McGuire PK, Riecher-Rössler A, Borgwardt SJ (July 2010). "Neuroimaging predictors of transition to psychosis--a systematic review and meta-analysis" (PDF). Neuroscience and Biobehavioral Reviews. 34 (8): 1207–22. doi:10.1016/j.neubiorev.2010.01.016. PMID 20144653. S2CID 23017758.
- Fusar-Poli P, Howes OD, Allen P, Broome M, Valli I, Asselin MC, Grasby PM, McGuire PK (July 2010). "Abnormal frontostriatal interactions in people with prodromal signs of psychosis: a multimodal imaging study". Archives of General Psychiatry. 67 (7): 683–91. doi:10.1001/archgenpsychiatry.2010.77. PMID 20603449.

== Recognition ==
- Rising Star Award by the Schizophrenia International Research Society (2012)
- Highly Cited Researcher by Clarivate Analytics (2015 – 2022)
