= William T. Carpenter =

American psychiatrist

- Education: Wofford College; Wake Forest University; University of Rochester
- Occupations: Psychiatrist; Clinician-Scientist
- Known for: Research on Schizophrenia; Expert witness in the John W. Hinckley trial for attempted assassination of President Reagan

William T. Carpenter is an American psychiatrist, a pioneer in the fields of psychiatry and pharmacology who served as an expert witness in the John W. Hinckley trial for the attempted assassination of U.S. President Ronald Reagan. His primary professional interest is in severe mental illness, especially schizophrenia, to the prevention and treatment of which he has made significant contributions in psychopathology, assessment methodology, testing of new treatments, and research ethics.

== Early life ==
Carpenter was raised in Rutherfordton, North Carolina, a farming community between Asheville and Charlotte, North Carolina. A standout athlete at Wofford College in South Carolina, Carpenter's abilities on the football field attracted the attention of the Baltimore Colts during his senior year in 1957, and the team offered him an opportunity to play professional football on the same team as legendary quarterback Johnny Unitas. After talking to his family and his minister, Carpenter turned them down. The next year, the Colts won the Western Conference championship and went on to defeat the New York Giants in the first overtime game in National Football League history, often referred to as the "greatest game ever played". Carpenter went on to a career in medicine, devoting a 50-plus-year career to the understanding and treatment of severe mental illness.

== Medical career ==
Carpenter obtained his M.D. degree from the Wake Forest University School of Medicine. After an internship at the North Carolina Baptist Hospital, he took postgraduate training at the University of Rochester Medical Center. He began his research career with the National Institute of Mental Health Intramural Program in 1966, using neuroendocrine strategies to study the psychobiology of affective disorders.

In 1966, Carpenter took a psychiatric researcher position at the National Institute of Mental Health (NIMH) in Bethesda, Maryland, where he studied the psychobiology of affective disorders. Following that, he became a collaborating investigator in the World Health Organization's International Pilot Study of Schizophrenia. At the WHO study, Carpenter developed his interest in schizophrenia research, studying prognosis, diagnosis, and treatment outcomes. He continued his work at the Albert Einstein College of Medicine and Columbia University in New York City before joining the faculty of the University of Maryland School of Medicine in 1977 as professor of psychiatry and director of the Maryland Psychiatric Research Center.

Carpenter has served as Editor-in-Chief for Schizophrenia Bulletin and on the editorial boards of the Archives of General Psychiatry, Biological Psychiatry, the Journal of Nervous and Mental Disease, Neuropsychopharmacology, Psychiatry Research, Schizophrenia Bulletin, Schizophrenia Research, Current Psychiatry Reports, and the CD-ROM version of the American College of Neuropsychopharmacology publication Neuropsychopharmacology: Fourth Generation of Progress.

His special professional assignments include service on the National Institute of Mental Health (NIMH) Intramural Research Program Board of Scientific Counselors and as a consultant and reviewer for NIMH and National Institutes of Health (NIH) on many topics. He has chaired the NIMH Research Scientist Career Development Committee and the NIMH National Plan Committee on Treatment Research and has been funded as principal investigator for NIMH center grants from 1986 to 2013. He is the only scientist to direct both an NIMH-funded Clinical Research Center (now Intervention Research Center) and an NIMH-funded Center for Neuroscience and Schizophrenia.

He is a past-president of the American College of Neuropsychopharmacology and participated in the founding of the National Alliance for Research on Schizophrenia and Depression, for which he has chaired its scientific program committee.

== Hinckley trial testimony ==
The trial of John Hinckley Jr. for attempting to assassinate President Ronald Reagan outside the Washington Hilton Hotel in 1981 and wounding the President, Press Secretary James Brady, a U.S. Secret Service agent and a police officer brought Carpenter into the national spotlight. As the defense psychiatrist, Carpenter interviewed Hinckley for a total of 45 hours and took the stand at the trial to provide a compelling three days of testimony. Hinckley was found not guilty by reason of insanity. Carpenter's testimony is credited with giving the field of psychiatry new credibility and increasing public awareness about severe mental illness.

== Honors and awards ==
Carpenter has been the recipient of 23 national and international research awards, was elected in 1998 to the Institute of Medicine of the National Academy of Sciences. and in 2019 received the SIRS Lifetime Achievement Award (Schizophrenia International Research Society) and the Pardes Humanitarian Prize in Mental Health (Brain and Behavior Research Foundation).

In addition to the U.S. Government v. John Hinckley case, Carpenter has provided expert testimony in the 1997 murder trial of John E. DuPont, and in 1989 was a member of the U.S. State Department delegation to inspect the political use of psychiatry in the Soviet Union.

He has authored over 400 clinical and scientific articles, books, and book chapters, a select list of which can be viewed at the University of Maryland School of Medicine Faculty Profiles website, and is in the top 0.5% of authors cited in his field.
