= Women's Christian College, Chennai =

Interdenominational women's college in Tamil Nadu, India

Women's Christian College
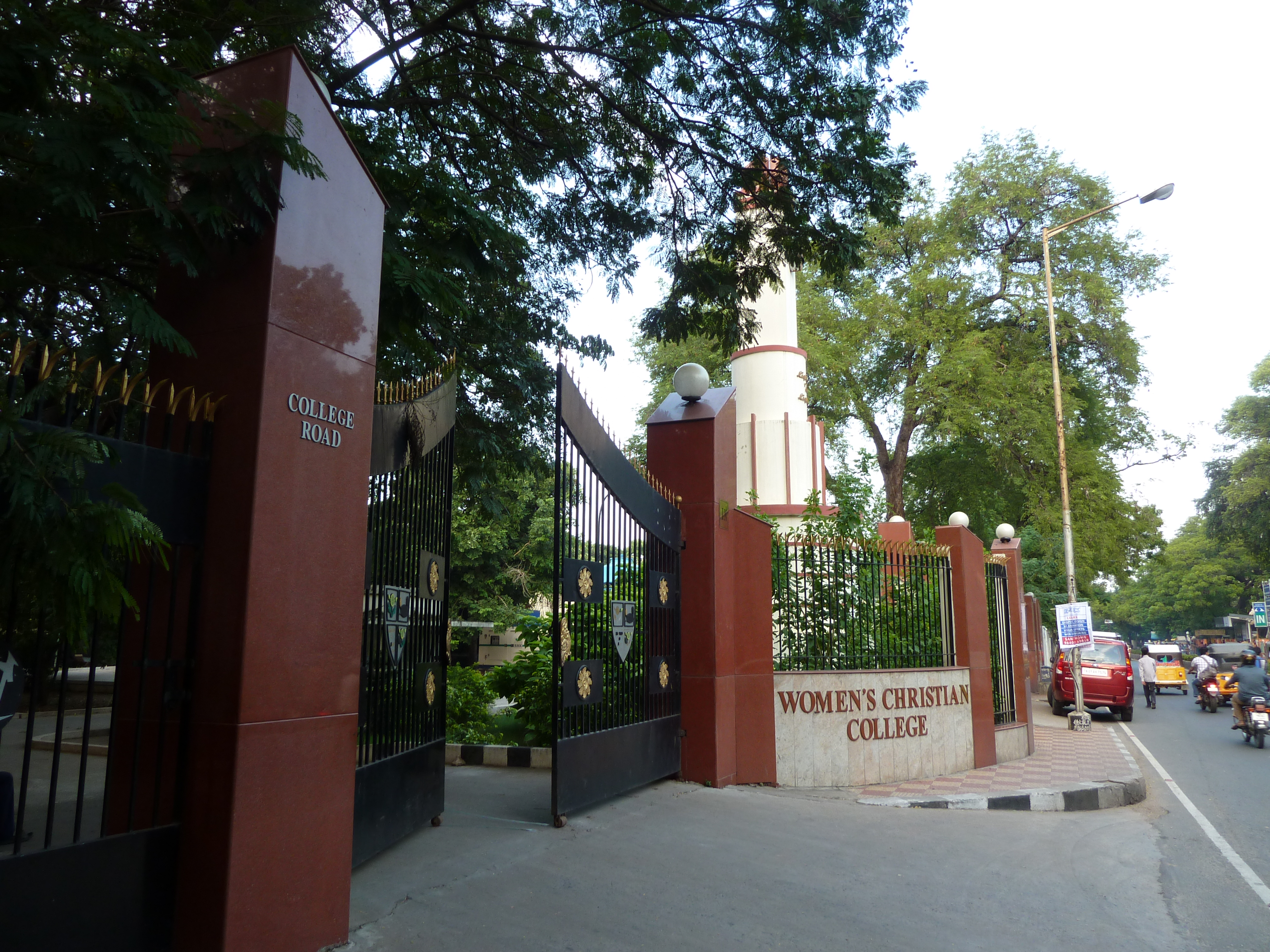
- College gate in 2011
- Motto: Lighted to Lighten
- Type: Aided
- Established: 1915; 111 years ago
- Affiliations: University of Madras
- Principal: Dr Lilian I Jasper
- Faculty: 156
- Undergraduates: 2646
- Location: Chennai, Tamil Nadu, India; 13°4′8.76″N 80°14′55.36″E
- Website: wcc.edu.in

Women's Christian College is an interdenominational women's college on College Road, Nungambakkam, in Chennai, Tamil Nadu, India.

== History ==
The Women's Christian College was founded in 1915 with 41 students and 7 faculty members, as a result of the joint venture of 12 missionary societies of interdenominational and international nature located in England, in Canada and in U.S.A., with a mission to provide higher education to women of India in liberal arts and sciences. The motto of the college is "Lighted to lighten". It was affiliated to the University of Madras and was given recognition as an autonomous college in 1982. At present it is a government-aided minority institution. It has grown to a strength of over 4252 students and 209 members of faculty in the aided and self-financing sections.

India's first female political prisoner and freedom fighter Rukmani Lakshmipathy was a first batch student.

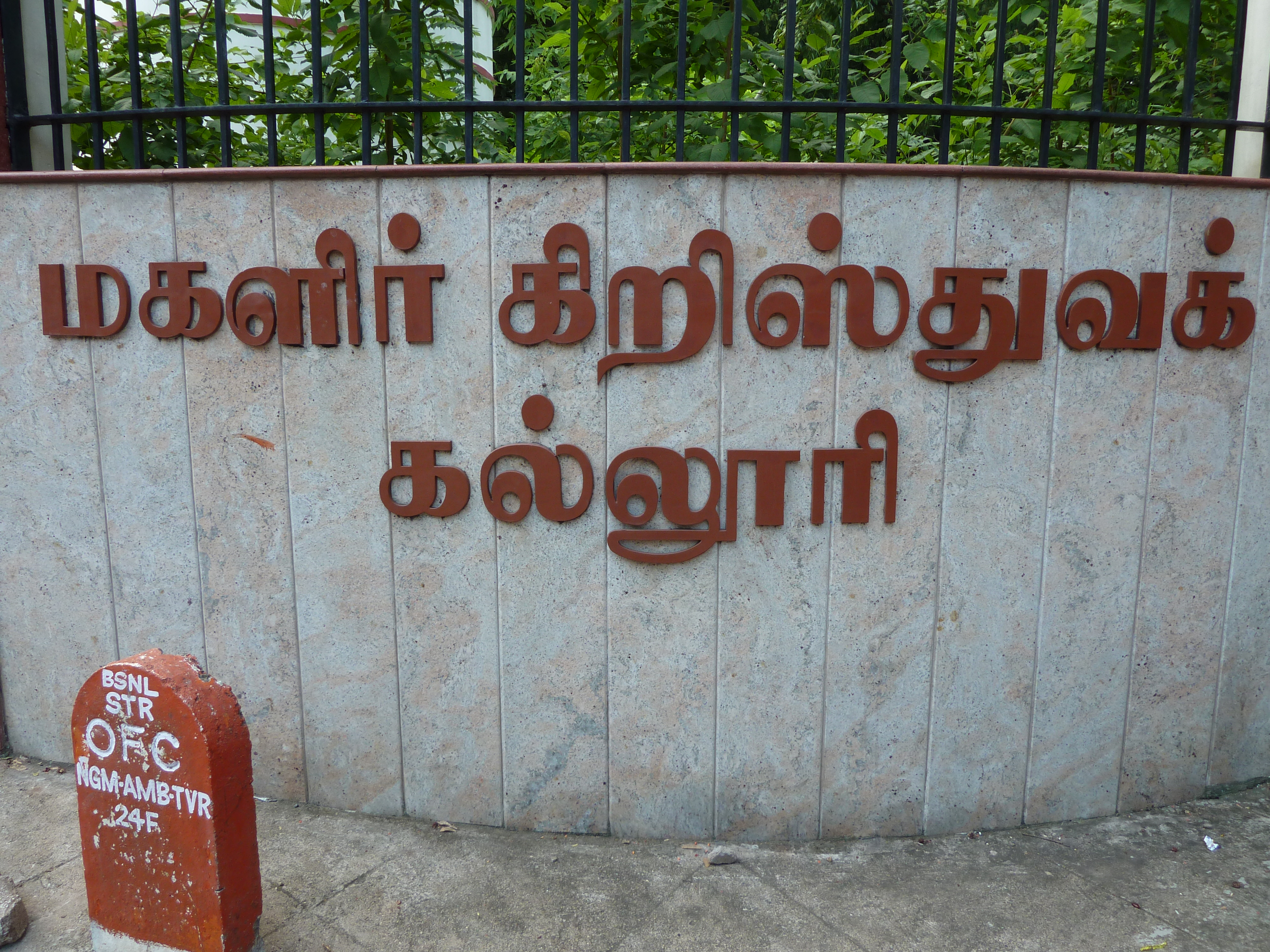
College name in Tamil at the entrance

=== Principals ===
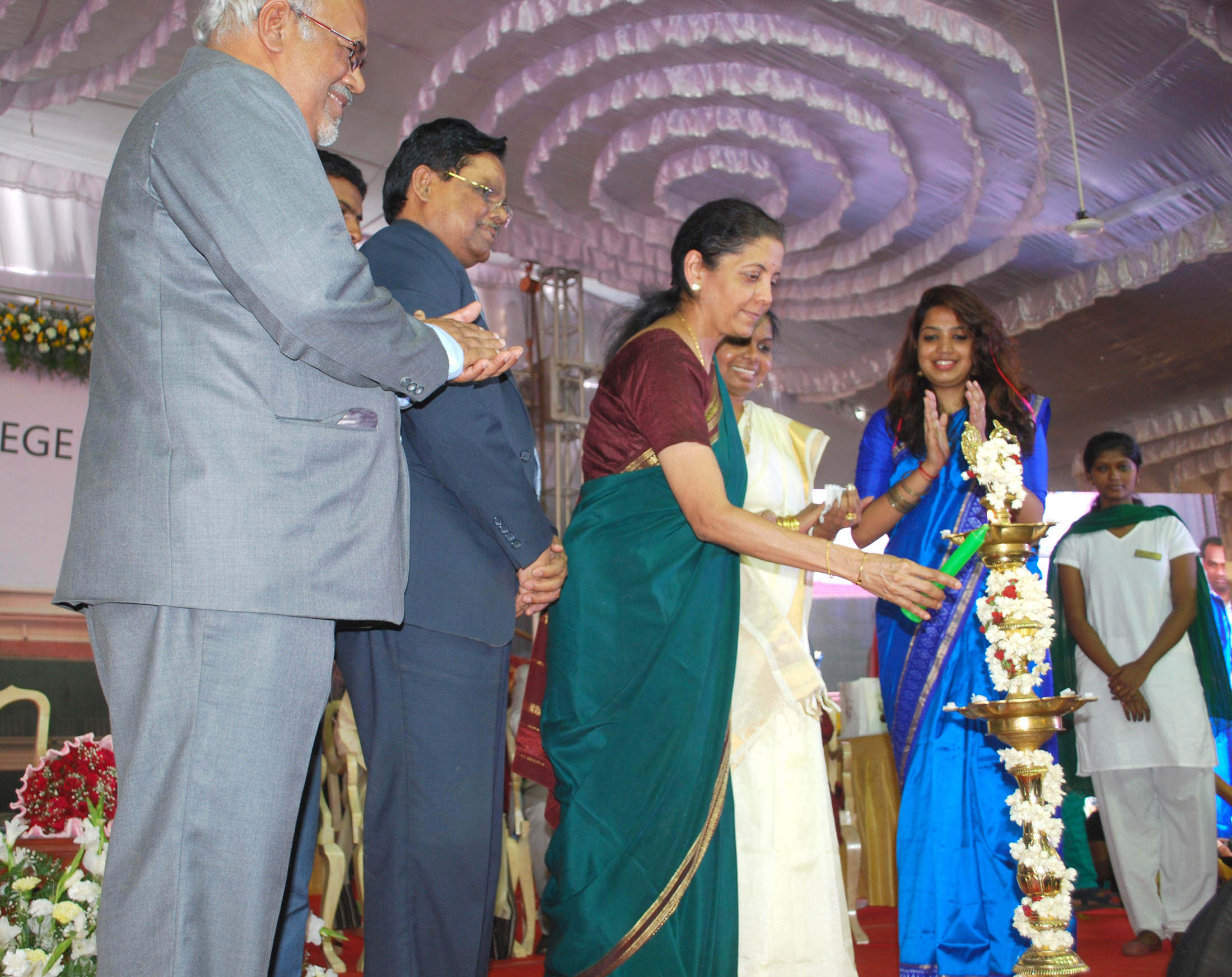
Nirmala Sitharaman at the Centenary Celebrations of Women's Christian College.

- Eleanor McDougall, 1915–1938
- Eleanor Rivett, 1938–1947
- Elizabeth George, 1947–1950
- Eleanor D. Mason, 1950–1956
- Renuka Mukerji, 1956–1965
- Anna T. Zachariah, 1965–1971
- Renuka Somasekhar, 1971–1981
- Indrani Michael, 1981–1994
- Kanmani Christian, 1994–1998
- Glory Christopher, 1998–2003
- Rita Jacob Cherian, 2003–2006
- Ridling Margaret Waller 2006–2017
- Lilian I Jasper, 2017–Present

== Sister college ==
Mount Holyoke College in South Hadley, Massachusetts, U.S., has been Women's Christian College's sister college since 1920. Both Mount Holyoke Culturals and Mount Holyoke Hostel (dormitory) at Women's Christian College refer to this.

== Rankings ==
College rankings

General – India
- NIRF (Colleges) (2022): 72

The college is ranked 67th among colleges in India by the National Institutional Ranking Framework (NIRF) in 2024.

== Notable alumni ==
- Megha Akash, actress
- Subhashini Ali, politician
- Regina Cassandra, actress and model
- Vandana Gopikumar, social worker and co-founder of The Banyan
- Andrea Jeremiah, singer and actress
- Shekinah Jacob, playwright
- Sudha Kongara Prasad, director
- Anaswara Kumar, actress
- Rukmini Lakshmipathi, freedom fighter and first women minister in Madras Presidency
- M. Sarada Menon, psychiatrist and Padma Bhushan awardee
- Reshmi Menon, actress
- Sonajharia Minz, vice-chancellor at Sido Kanhu Murmu University
- C. B. Muthamma, India's first woman civil servant
- Shoba Narayan, journalist
- Thangam Philip, nutritionist and Padma Shri awardee
- Heera Rajagopal, actress
- Mallika Srinivasan, industrialist
- Roopa Unnikrishnan, sports shooter
