= Paola Dazzan =

British Italian psychiatrist and academic

- Born: Sardinia
- Education: Maudsley Hospital; King's College London
- Scientific career
- Workplaces: King's College London
- Thesis: Neurological soft signs in first episode psychosis : their clinical and neuroanatomical correlates (2006)

Paola Dazzan is a British Italian psychiatrist, academic, and researcher specialising in the neurobiology of psychosis. She is Professor of Neurobiology of Psychosis and Vice Dean for International Affairs at the Institute of Psychiatry, Psychology and Neuroscience. Dazzan was awarded the European Psychiatric Association Constance Pascal – Helen Boyle Prize and is an honorary member of the American Psychiatric Association. She is also a practising clinician and Consultant Perinatal Psychiatrist at the South London and Maudsley NHS Foundation Trust.

== Early life and education ==
Dazzan was born in Sardinia. At the age of eight, she moved with her family to northern Italy before later returning to Sardinia, where she completed medical school. She later moved to the United Kingdom, where she has spent much of her professional career. Her early interest in psychiatry was influenced by her studies in philosophy during school, particularly ideas concerning the relationship between thought, experience, and behaviour. Dazzan obtained her medical degree in Italy before moving to the United Kingdom to pursue postgraduate training. She trained as a psychiatrist at the Maudsley Hospital in London and later completed a PhD at the Institute of Psychiatry, Psychology and Neuroscience.

== Research and career ==
Dazzan focuses on the neurobiological and environmental risk factors for psychosis, particularly during early stages of illness. Her work examines how biological, social, and environmental factors interact across the lifespan to influence mental health outcomes. Her work looks to understand how neurodevelopmental indicators, stress and inflammatory markers, and reproductive hormones contribute to the onset and outcomes of psychoses and other severe mental health conditions. She has conducted studies using neuroimaging techniques such as structural MRI and diffusion tensor imaging to identify biomarkers associated with psychosis and treatment response. Her work has shown that alterations in brain structure, including cortical gyrification and white matter integrity, may be linked to poorer responses to antipsychotic treatment in individuals experiencing first-episode psychosis.

Dazzan was among the first researchers to conduct neuroimaging studies in women at risk of postpartum psychosis. Dazzan has shown that certain groups of women, particularly those with a history of bipolar disorder or prior postpartum psychosis, have a significantly elevated risk of developing the condition shortly after childbirth. She has argued for greater recognition of postpartum psychosis as a distinct diagnostic entity in psychiatric classification systems, emphasising the importance of early identification, specialist care, and targeted research.

== Awards and honours ==
- Academic of the Year Award, Royal College of Psychiatrists
- NARSAD Investigator Awards
- Honorary Membership, American Psychiatric Association
- European Psychiatric Association Constance Pascal – Helen Boyle Prize

== Personal life ==
Dazzan enjoys scuba diving. She says that she is inspired by Ruth Bader Ginsburg.

== Selected publications ==
- Theo G M van Erp; Esther Walton; Derrek P Hibar; et al. (14 May 2018). "Cortical Brain Abnormalities in 4474 Individuals With Schizophrenia and 5098 Control Subjects via the Enhancing Neuro Imaging Genetics Through Meta Analysis (ENIGMA) Consortium". Biological Psychiatry. 84 (9): 644–654. doi:10.1016/j.biopsych.2018.04.023. ISSN 0006-3223. PMC 6177304. PMID 29960671. Wikidata Q55983721.
- Ian Jones; Prabha S Chandra; Paola Dazzan; Louise M Howard (14 November 2014). "Bipolar disorder, affective psychosis, and schizophrenia in pregnancy and the post-partum period". The Lancet. 384 (9956): 1789–1799. doi:10.1016/s0140-6736(14)61278-2. ISSN 0140-6736. PMID 25455249. Wikidata Q34451170.
- James B. Kirkbride; Paul Fearon; Craig Morgan; et al. (1 March 2006). "Heterogeneity in Incidence Rates of Schizophrenia and Other Psychotic Syndromes". JAMA Psychiatry. 63 (3): 250. doi:10.1001/archpsyc.63.3.250. ISSN 2168-622X. PMID 16520429. Wikidata Q22253032.
