= Shoba Narayan =

Shoba Narayan may refer to:

- Shoba Narayan (writer)
- Shoba Narayan (actress)
