= Andreas Heinz =

Andreas Heinz may refer to:

- Andreas Heinz (psychotherapist) (born 1960), German psychiatrist and psychotherapist
- Andreas Heinz (badminton) (born 1991), German badminton player
