= Frangou =

Frangou (Greek: Φράγκου) is a Greek surname. Notable people with the surname include:

- Angeliki Frangou (born 1965), Greek shipowner
- Athanasios Frangou (1864–1923), Greek military officer
- Sophia Frangou, Greek psychiatrist
