= Sharon Kivland =

Dr Sharon Kivland (born 1955 in Germany) is an artist and writer living in Brittany and London. She was Reader in Fine Art at Sheffield Hallam University and Research Associate at the Centre for Freudian Analysis and Research in London. She has exhibited internationally since 1979 and her work was represented by Galerie Bugdahn und Kaimer in Düsseldorf. for many years until the gallery closed. She was a commissioning editor for the journal EROS, and now is editor and publisher of her own small press MA BIBLIOTHÈQUE, based in London. In 2023 she became Visiting Professor at Kingston University, London.

== Awards and recognition ==
Kivland has received numerous awards and grants for her work, including the Greater London Arts award (1987 and 1991), the Henry Moore Foundation exhibition award (1987), the Tower Hamlets Artists award (1987), The Elephant Trust publication award (1988), the British School at Rome award in Sculpture (1990), a Canadian Council research award (1991), the Harmstone Bequest from Sheffield City Council (1993), and more. She has also undertaken numerous prestigious residencies, including ones at the University of Windsor, Ontario, Canada (1989), Ontario College of Art, Toronto, Canada (1996), Cité des Arts Internationale, Paris (1997) and the Second International Artists Village, Sri Lanka (1998).

== Academic work and research ==
=== Transmission ===
As Reader in Fine Art and Principal Lecturer at Sheffield Hallam University, Kivland has developed the long-running lecture series and research project Transmission, alongside colleagues Lesley Sanderson (2001–2004) and Jaspar Joseph-Lester (2004 onwards). The lecture series is a collaboration between the Art and Design Research Centre, Sheffield Hallam University, and Site Gallery, Sheffield. The project has produced over ten years of lectures, symposia, related publications, a set of prints, and recently a series of annuals, beginning in 2010 with Transmission Annual: HOSPITALITY and continuing with 2012's Transmission Annual: PROVOCATION. In 2010, the Transmission: HOSPITALITY conference was held at Sheffield Hallam University, where keynote speakers included Clegg and Guttmann (Artists, Germany), Juliet Flower MacCannell (Professor Emerita of Comparative Literature and English, UC Irvine) Ahuvia Kahane (Professor of Greek, Royal Holloway, University of London), Esther Leslie (Professor in Political Aesthetics, Birkbeck, University of London) Dany Nobus (Professor, School of Social Sciences, Brunel, University West London), and Blake Stimson (Professor of Art History, University of California).

== Exhibitions ==
Kivland has exhibited widely in Europe and North America. Recent solo exhibitions include: Entreprise de séduction (Espace d'art contemporain HEC, Jouy-en-Josas, in association with the musée de la toile de Jouy, 2018; The Natural Forms, Part II (HGB, Leipzig, 2016); The Natural Forms, Part II (Kunstverein-Tiergarten Berlin, 2015-16; Natürliche Formen – Von Frauen, Füchsen und Lesern (Dieselkraftwerkmuseum, Cottbus, 2015); Folles de leur corps / Crazy about their bodies (after a footnote in Marx's Capital), CGP, London, UK (2014). Sharon Kivland. Amateur and Collector, curated by Sotiris Kyriacou at Ideas Store Whitechapel, London (2012), I am sick of my thoughts, DomoBaal, London (2011), Mes plus belles, Le Sphinx. Paris, (2010), A Wind of Revolution Blows, the Storm is on the Horizon, Chelsea Space, London (2008), Mon abécédaire, Sleeper, Edinburgh (2008), and Natural Education, Bast'art, Bratislava (2008).

== Work ==
=== Book works ===
Kivland's book series, Freud on Holiday, addresses her particular relation to the work of Sigmund Freud. Through photographs and essays, Kivland's books re-imagine journeys made (and sometimes dreamt) by Freud to European sites of archaeological importance. She completed volume 3, The Forgetting of a Proper Name, in which holiday destinations prove rather problematic, in 2011 (Cube Art Editions and information as material). Two appendices have been added to this series: "Freud's Weather" and "Freud's Dining" (information as material 2011), which will be followed by "Freud's Shopping" and "Freud's Hotels", and the fourth volume in the holiday series, "A Cavernous Defile", in which she follows Freud (among others) to the Trentino and the Hotel du Lac.

An accompanying series of books explores Freud and architecture (L'esprit d'escalier, 2007), Freud and real estate (An agent of the estate, 2008), Freud and the Wolf-Man and deferred effect (Afterwards, Mead Gallery, Warwick Arts Centre, 2009), Freud and the gift of flowers (with Forbes Morlock, 2009), and the reason Freud changed hotels in Paris in 1885 (forthcoming, 2013). She has ventured into a small series of pamphlets, printed in a small edition, titled Reisen. The first of these modest booklets contains short extracts from The Interpretation of Dreams, published in 1900, edited, to a certain extent, in an attempt to retain only references to trains. The second contains details of some of the train journeys of Freud's holidays, gleaned from his correspondence home, with reference to contemporary editions of Cook's Continental Time Tables, Tourist's Handbook and Steamship Tables, supplemented by consultation of the European rail timetables of the present day.

==== A Case of Hysteria ====
Kivland's book A Case of Hysteria, published in 1999 by Book Works, won acclaim for its integration of psychoanalytic research and artistic method. The book follows Freud's influential 'Fragments of an Analysis of a Case of Hysteria', in which he charts the treatment of his patient 'Dora', and unfolds the enduring mysteries of the case in ways that reference, collect and in some ways exceed existing study of the subject. In her review in the Journal of European Psychoanalysis Julia Borossa called the work 'astonishing', noting: 'What A Case of Hysteria does is make strategic use of Freud's "Fragment of an Analysis of a Case of Hysteria" in order to argue a series of very important points about, on the one hand, what constitutes a case study, and on the other, about writing and the creative process itself'. She concluded by calling the work: 'A book which is highly original and demanding of its readers, [and] has important things to say about the elusiveness of the intersubjective encounter versus an iconic status of Freud's text.'
