= Sukanya Datta =

Indian zoologist and author (born 1961)

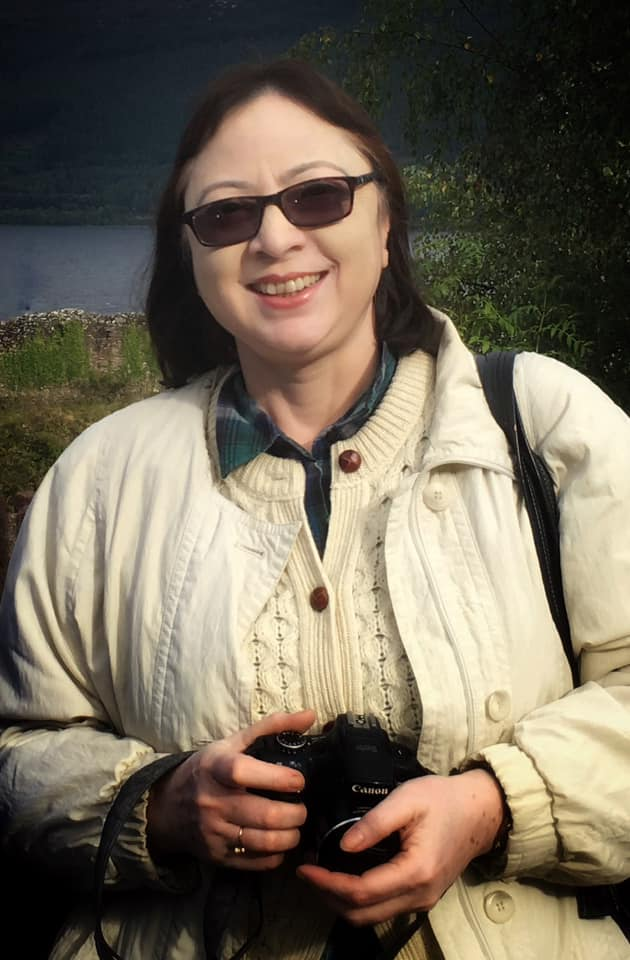
- Born: Sukanya Datta; 1961 (age 64–65); Kolkata, India
- Occupation: Writer

Sukanya Datta (born 1961) is an Indian zoologist and author who popularises science through books, radio scripts, articles, and book reviews.

== Life and career ==
Born in Calcutta in 1961, Datta was educated in the University of Calcutta where she attained her doctorate in zoology. She has superannuated as Chief Scientist at the Council of Scientific and Industrial Research. She has written numerous books on both science and science fiction. In 2018, Gautham Shenoy wrote for FactorDaily, "Infused with humour, Datta's stories span the gamut of possibilities – from stories set on Mars, to tales based amongst tribes, and many set in the near future." Her works are written in English and have been translated into Bangla, Hindi, Odiya and Marathi.

== Bibliography ==
- A Kite's Story (New Delhi, National Book Trust) Hindi, Odiya translations by NBT
- A Touch of Glass (New Delhi, National Book Trust, 2016)
- Adventures of Jhilik (New Delhi, Publications Division)
- Amazing Adaptations (New Delhi, National Book Trust, 2012)
- Animal Architecture (National Book Trust, 2020)
- Beyond the Blue: A Collection of Sci-Fi Stories (New Delhi, India: Rupa and Company, 2008)
- Golden Treasury of Science & Technology (New Delhi, NISCAIR) [Co-authored]
- How? (New Delhi, NISCAIR) [Co-authored]
- Indian Scientists: The Saga of Inspired Minds (New Delhi, India: Vigyan Prasar, 2018) [Contributor]
- Life of Earth (New Delhi, Vigyan Prasar)
- Once Upon a Blue Moon: Science Fiction Stories (New Delhi, India: National Book Trust, 2006) (Jab Chand Neela Tha, Hindi. NBT)
- Operation Gene (New Delhi; NISCAIR)
- Other Skies (New Delhi, India: Vigyan Prasar, 2017)
- Plants Make Friends Too (New Delhi, Wisdom Tree, 2015)
- Rain Rain Come Again (New Delhi, NISCAIR)
- Shanti Swarup Bhatnagar, the Man and his Mission (New Delhi, NISCAIR)
- Snakes (New Delhi, Vigyan Prasar)
- Social Life of Animals (New Delhi, National Book Trust, 2014)
- Social Life of Plants (New Delhi: National Book Trust, India, 2012)
- The Secrets of Proteins (New Delhi, National Book Trust) [With Medha Rajadhyaksha]
- The Wonderful Marine World (New Delhi, Publications Division)
- Vistas in Science Communication (Co-authored Report)
- What? (New Delhi, NISCAIR) [Co-authored]
- Why? (New Delhi, NISCAIR) [Co-authored]
- Worlds Apart: Science Fiction Stories (New Delhi, India: National Book Trust, 2012)
- Tomorrow Again (National Book Trust, 2023)
- The Magic of Migration (2023 CSIR-NIScPR)
- S is for Survival (Under consideration by National Book Trust)
- A to Z Science fiction stories: an anthology of 26 Golu-mamu stories (Kalpabiswa Publications, 2024)
- Neel Chander Prohor Bangla translation. Kalpabiswa
