= Lynn DeLisi =

American psychiatrist

- Born: Lynn Moskowitz
- Education: University of Wisconsin–Madison; Medical College of Pennsylvania
- Known for: Research on schizophrenia
- Spouse: Charles DeLisi
- Awards: Fellow of the American Association for the Advancement of Science (2014)
- Scientific career
- Fields: Psychiatric genetics
- Institutions: National Institute of Mental Health; State University of New York at Stony Brook; New York University; VA Boston Healthcare System; Harvard Medical School

Lynn Eleanor DeLisi (née Moskowitz) is an American psychiatrist known for her research on schizophrenia. She is an attending psychiatrist at the VA Boston Healthcare System and a professor of psychiatry at Harvard Medical School. She is the editor-in-chief of Psychiatry Research and the past president of the Schizophrenia International Research Society. She was a co-founder of both the Schizophrenia International Research Society and the International Society of Psychiatric Genetics, and went on to serve as secretary of both organizations. She was one of two founding editors-in-chief of Schizophrenia Research, which she founded with Henry Nasrallah in 1988. She is also the author of the best-selling book 100 Questions and Answers about Schizophrenia: Painful Minds. She was elected a fellow of the American Association for the Advancement of Science in 2014.

== Education and career ==
DeLisi earned her undergraduate degree from the University of Wisconsin–Madison and her M.D. from the Medical College of Pennsylvania. She worked at the National Institute of Mental Health in their intramural research program until 1987, when she became a professor at the State University of New York at Stony Brook. She became a professor of psychiatry at the New York University School of Medicine and Associate Director of the Center for Advanced Brain Imaging at the Nathan Kline Institute for Psychiatric Research in 2001. She held both of these positions until 2009, when she began working at the Boston VA and Harvard. In November 2019 she moved to Cambridge Health Alliance and is Attending Psychiatrist on the acute inpatient service of Cambridge Hospital. Her career and life's work is featured in the NY Times best seller book by Robert Kolker, Hidden Valley Road.
