= Andreas Heinz (psychotherapist) =

German psychiatrist and neurologist

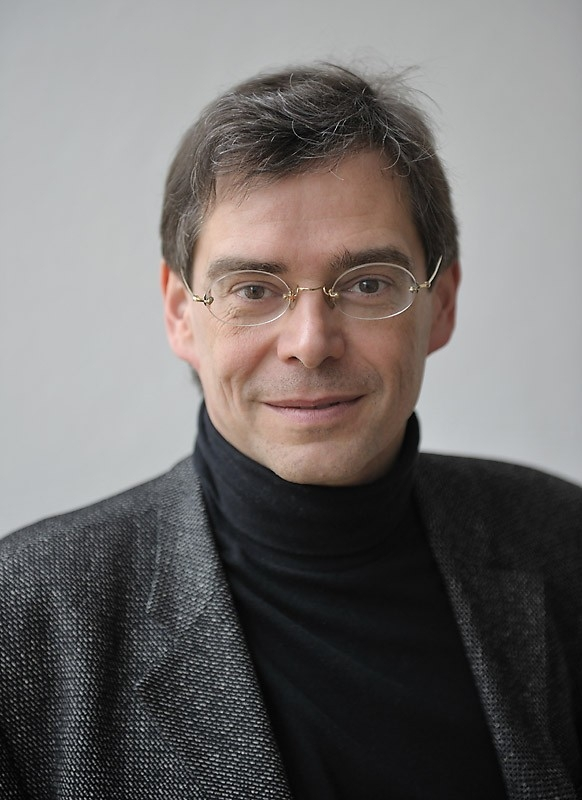
- Born: February 4, 1960 (age 66); Stuttgart, Germany
- Occupation: Psychiatrist and Neurologist

Andreas Heinz (born February 4, 1960, in Stuttgart) is a German psychiatrist and neurologist.

== Early life and education ==
Andreas Heinz studied medicine, philosophy and anthropology in Bochum at the Ruhr-Universität Bochum, in Berlin at the Freie Universität Berlin and at the Howard University of Washington D.C. In 1988 he submitted his dissertation (MD) Anthropological and Evolutionary Models in Schizophrenia Researchat the Ruhr-Universität Bochum.

== Career ==
Heinz worked as a post-doc at the National Institute of Health, Bethesda, MD. He qualified for professorship (Habilitation) in psychiatry and psychotherapy in 1998 The Dopaminergic Reward System. In 2013, he obtained a PhD in philosophy The Concept of Mental Health at the faculty of philosophy of the Universität Potsdam and in 2022 he habilitated in philosophy The colonialized brain and the ways of revolt at the faculty of philosophy of the Universität Potsdam.

From 2002 until 2025 Heinz was the director of the Department of Psychiatry and Psychotherapy Campus Charité Mitte Berlin. Since 2012, he has been the vice chair of an organization for Psychiatric Reform and Humanization, the Aktion für Psychisch Kranke. From 2010 to 2014, he was the president of the German Society for Biological Psychiatry (DGBP). From 2008 to 2011, he was the speaker of the Conference of University Chairs of Psychiatry in Germany. Since 2009, he has been a member of the board of the German Association for Psychiatry, Psychotherapy and Neurology and was president of the association from 2020 to 2021. He was the leader of several research projects including the international research project "Mental Health and Migration". He is a proponent of a person centered approach and open wards in psychiatry.

In 2011 he was elected as a Leibnitz chair at the Leibnitz-Institute for Neurobiology in Magdeburg, in recognition of outstanding research in Neuroscience. For the fall semester of 2014/2015 he was a Karl Jaspers guest professor at the University of Oldenburg.

Heinz is the editor of 13 books including the Practice of Intercultural Psychiatry and Psychotherapy, Migration and Mental Health and the author of many scientific publications including studies focussing on psychiatry in national socialism, critical neuroscience and the neurobiology of psychotic and addictive disorders.

Andreas Heinz is the grandson of the former president of the employment office of the state of Baden-Württemberg, Eugen Heinz.

Since April 2025, Andreas Heinz is a Senior Professor at the Department of Psychiatry and Psychotherapy, University of Tübingen.

== Work ==
In his review of psychiatric theories that tried to explain the manifestation of schizophrenia in the 20th century, Heinz criticized the use of Eurocentric developmental models. Such models suggest that cultural development is unilinear and reflects brain development, with Europeans representing the allegedly most developed stage and other populations reflecting more "primitive" stages of cultural, as well as brain development. In such developmental models, schizophrenia is seen as a loss of higher cognitive functions and an evolutionary "dissolution" or "regression" to a more "primitive" functional level, which is supposed to cause alleged similarities between psychotic experience, and magic or "prelogic" ideation among non-European populations. Heinz shows that such theories are internally inconsistent, project an oversimplified model of brain development onto social interactions, and fail to recognize that allegedly "primitive" populations, at the beginning of the 20th century, were subjected to European imperialism and colonialism. Heinz criticizes unilinear models for not only failing to acknowledge the diversity of human development, but also project structurally oversimplified models of top-down control and bottom-up subjection onto brain areas. This mean failing to adequately reflect complex interactions in the human central nervous system. Heinz emphasizes the impact of social and political ideas as well as racist prejudices on the historical development of research paradigms and theories regarding mental disorders.

In his empirical work, Heinz focused on bottom-up information processing in reward learning and the associated neurotransmitter systems, such as the dopamine and serotonin system. Transferring ideas on dopamine function from addiction research to schizophrenia, he suggested that in psychosis, chaotic or stress-associated phasic increases in striatal dopamine release attribute salience to otherwise irrelevant stimuli and thus contribute to delusional mood, a hypothesis later also supported by Shitij Kapur. Further empirical studies of Heinz and coworkers falsified simple top-down models of cerebral dysfunction in psychotic disorders; instead, his findings confirmed complex interactions between brain areas computing reward-related prediction errors, processing appetitive and threatening stimuli as well as contributing to fluid intelligence.

With respect to cognitive capacity and intelligence, Heinz emphasized stress-related alterations in dopaminergic neurotransmission and their impact on the neurobiological correlates of fluid intelligence. He suggested that social isolation stress and discrimination are key factors interacting with basic cognitive functions as well as general mental health. Based on studies emphasizing the role of social exclusion, Heinz promotes community care and the orientation of regional psychiatric hospitals towards settings with open doors and inclusion of subjects with mental health care problems in all aspects of society.

With respect to concepts of mental health and disease, Heinz criticized the view that mental disorders can be understood referring to a concept of "normality"; he argues that the frequency in which mental disorders are present (e.g. rising rates of Alzheimer's Dementia in old age) does not offer a valid criterion to decide whether a certain state can be understood as a disease or not. Instead, Heinz suggests that discussions about mental maladies should distinguish between the medical ("disease") aspects of any disorder, the subjective illness experience (centered about individual suffering) and impairments in social participation (the "sickness" aspect of a mental malady). Heinz suggests that a clinically relevant mental malady should only be diagnosed, if the disease criterion and either the illness or sickness criterion are fulfilled. With respect to the medical aspect, Heinz claims that the disease criterion of a mental malady is only fulfilled if an impaired mental function is generally relevant for survival or at least the ability of the afflicted person to live with other human beings in a common world ("Mitwelt"). With respect to clinical practice, Heinz suggests that medically relevant symptoms of mental disorders such as a delirium or dementia are directly life-threatening, while key symptoms of psychosis and major affective disorders can impair the ability of an afflicted person to live with others, e.g. because own intentions and acts are attributed to outside forces such as "imperative acoustic hallucinations" or "inserted thoughts". Heinz emphasizes that such impairments at the symptom or disease level of a mental disorder are not sufficient to diagnose a clinically relevant mental malady, because some subjects experience acoustic hallucinations (thus fulfilling the disease criterion) but neither suffer from them nor are impaired in social participation. He claims that in such cases, no clinically relevant mental malady should be diagnosed. Heinz suggests focusing the mental health care system on subjects with clinically relevant mental maladies to promote inclusion in the community and on the work place.

== Honors ==
- Wilhelm-Feuerlein-Forschungspreis 2000; Division Fundamental Research; Topic: Die Rolle der serotonergen Funktionsstörung in der Entstehung und Aufrechterhaltung der Alkoholabhängigkeit
- June 2011: Granting of the „Leibniz Chairs“ by the Leibniz-Institute for Neurobiology (LIN) Magdeburg for excellent research in the field of neurosciences
- November 2011 (together with Anne Beck) and 2014 (together with Lorenz Deserno): Granting of the Hans-Heimann-Prize by the German Society of Psychiatry, Psychotherapy, Psychosomatic Medicine and Neurology (Deutschen Gesellschaft für Psychiatrie, Psychotherapie, Psychosomatik und Nervenheilkunde)
- Since 2013: Member of the Akademie der Wissenschaften und der Literatur Mainz
- Since 2015: Member of the Leopoldina – National Academy of Sciences
- 2019-2023: Speaker of the Collaborative Research Grant SFB-TR 265
- 2024: Spokesperson of the German Center for Health Research (DZPG)
- 2024: European Addiction Research Award 2024
- 2024: Honorary Fellowship der European Society of Social Psychiatry

== Memberships ==
- Deputy Chairman of Aktion Psychisch Kranke e.V. (APK), since 2012
- Member of the Council of the German Society of Psychiatry, Psychotherapy and Neurology (DGPPN), since 2009
- Board member of the European Psychiatric Association (EPA), 2013–2016
- President of the German Society of Biological Psychiatry (DGBP), 2010–2014
- Speaker of the German Conference of Chairs of Psychiatric University Departments, 2008–2011

== Publications (selected) ==
- Heinz, Andreas (1998), "Colonial practices in the construction of the schizophrenic patient as primitive man", Critique of Anthropology, 18: 421–444, doi:10.1177/0308275x9801800404, S2CID 143876209
- Heinz, Andreas (2002), "Dopaminergic dysfunction in alcoholism and schizophrenia--psychopathological and behavioral correlates", European Psychiatry, 17 (1): 9–16, doi:10.1016/s0924-9338(02)00628-4, PMID 11918987, S2CID 29071116
- Andreas Heinz; D. F. Braus; M. N. Smolka; J. Wrase; I. Puls; D. Hermann; S. Klein; S. M. Grüsser; H. Flor; G. Schumann; K. Mann; C. Büchel (2005), "Amygdala-prefrontal coupling depends on a genetic variation of the serotonin transporter", Nature Neuroscience, 8 (1): 20–21, doi:10.1038/nn1366, PMID 15592465, S2CID 41207109
- U. Lang; S. Hartmann; S. Schulz-Hartmann; Y. Gudlowski; R. Ricken; I. Munk; D. von Haebler; J. Gallinat; Andreas Heinz (2010), "Do locked doors in psychiatric hospitals prevent patients from absconding?", European Journal of Psychiatry, 4/24: 199–204
- A. J. Heinz; A. Beck; A. Meyer-Lindenberg; P. Sterzer; Andreas Heinz (2011), "Cognitive and neurobiological mechanisms of alcohol-related aggression", Nature Reviews Neuroscience, 12 (7): 400–413, doi:10.1038/nrn3042, PMID 21633380, S2CID 205506613
- Andreas Heinz; Daniel J. Müller; Sören Krach; Maurice Cabanis; Ulrike P. Kluge (2014), "The uncanny return of the race concept", Frontiers in Human Neuroscience, 8: 1–10, doi:10.3389/fnhum.2014.00836, PMC 4219449, PMID 25408642
- Andreas Heinz, ed. (2017), A New Understanding of Mental Disorders - Computational Models for Dimensional Psychiatry, MIT Press
- Andreas Heinz; Xudong Zhao; Shuyan Liu (2020), "Implications of the Association of Social Exclusion With Mental Health", JAMA Psychiatry, 77 (2): 113–114, doi:10.1001/jamapsychiatry.2019.3009, PMID 31596429, S2CID 203984068
- Lea Marscarell Maričić; Henrik Walter; Annika Rosenthal; Andreas Heinz; et al. (2020), "The IMAGEN study: a decade of imaging genetics in adolescents", Molecular Psychiatry, 25 (11): 2648–2671, doi:10.1038/s41380-020-0822-5, PMC 7577859, PMID 32601453
