= The Truman Show delusion =

Delusion in which one believes their life is a staged reality TV show

The Truman Show delusion, also known as Truman syndrome or Truman disorder, is a type of delusion in which the person believes that their life is a staged reality show, or that they are being watched on cameras. The term was coined in 2008 on film boards by brothers Joel Gold and Ian Gold, a psychiatrist and a neurophilosopher, respectively, after the 1998 film The Truman Show.

The Truman Show delusion is not officially recognized nor listed in the Diagnostic and Statistical Manual of the American Psychiatric Association.

== Background ==
Rapid expansion of technology raises questions about which delusions are possible and which ones are bizarre.

— Dolores Malaspina, DSM-5 editor

The term was named after the film The Truman Show, a 1998 psychological comedy-drama film directed by Peter Weir and written by Andrew Niccol. Actor Jim Carrey plays Truman Burbank, a man who discovers he is living in a constructed reality televised globally around the clock. Since he was born, his entire life has been televised and all the people in his life have been paid actors. As he discovers the truth about his existence, Burbank fights to find an escape from those who have controlled him his entire life.

The concept predates this particular film, which was inspired by a 1989 episode of The Twilight Zone in its 1980s incarnation, titled "Special Service", which begins with the protagonist discovering a camera in his bathroom mirror. This man soon learns that his life is being constantly broadcast to TV watchers worldwide. In 1941, science fiction writer Robert A. Heinlein had written They, a story about a man surrounded by persons whose job is to convince him that he is insane rather than one of the few genuine people in his world. In 1959, Philip K. Dick wrote a novel, Time Out of Joint, in which the protagonist lives in a created world in which his "family" and "friends" are all paid to maintain the illusion. In 1963, Keith Laumer published a short story "It Could Be Anything", about Brett, who experiences a train mishap that leads him to a city of hollowed-out buildings where the few humans are deluded into thinking they live in a city filled with real people. Later science fiction novels repeat the theme. While these books do not share the reality-show aspects of The Truman Show, they do have in common the concept of a world that has been constructed by others.

== Delusions ==
Delusions – fixed, fallacious beliefs – are symptoms that, in the absence of organic disease, indicate psychiatric disease. The content of delusions varies considerably (limited by the imagination of the delusional person), but certain themes have been identified: for example, persecution. These themes have diagnostic importance in that they point to certain diagnoses. Persecutory delusions are, for instance, classically linked to psychosis.

=== Cultural effect ===
The content of delusions is invariably tied to a person's life experience, and contemporary culture seems to play an important role. A retrospective study conducted in 2008 showed how delusional content has evolved from religious/magical, to political and eventually to technically themed. The authors concluded that:

sociopolitical changes and scientific and technical developments have a marked influence on the delusional content in schizophrenia.

Psychiatrist Joseph Weiner commented that:

in the 1940s, psychotic patients would express delusions about their brains being controlled by radio waves; now delusional patients commonly complain about implanted computer chips.

The Truman Show delusion could represent a further evolution in the content of persecutory delusions in reaction to changing pop culture.

Because reality shows are so visible, it is an area that a patient can easily incorporate into a delusional system. Such a person would believe they are constantly being videotaped, watched, and commented upon by a large TV audience.

For the 2022 Cannes Film Festival, its official poster pays homage to the film and its final scene with their website stating that "Peter Weir and Andrew Niccol's The Truman Show (1998) is a modern reflection of Plato's cave and the decisive scene urges viewers to not only experience the border between reality and its representation but to ponder the power of fiction, between manipulation and catharsis."

The Truman Show delusion was featured in a 2025 episode of the American medical drama television series Brilliant Minds. Titled 'The Contestant', the episode centered on a patient who believed they were a participant on a reality television show.

== Reported cases ==
While the prevalence of the disorder is not known, there have been several hundred cases reported. There have been recorded instances of people suffering from the Truman Show delusion from around the world. Joel Gold, a psychiatrist at Bellevue Hospital Center in New York City, and clinical associate professor of psychiatry at New York University, and his brother Ian, who holds a research chair in philosophy and psychiatry at Montreal's McGill University, are the foremost researchers on the subject. They have communicated, since 2002, with over a hundred individuals suffering from the delusion. They have reported that one patient traveled to New York City after 9/11 to make sure that the terrorist attacks were not a plot twist in his personal Truman Show, while another traveled to a Lower Manhattan federal building to seek asylum from his show. Another patient had worked as an intern on a reality TV program and believed that he was secretly being tracked by cameras, even at the polls on election day in 2004. He shouted that President George W. Bush was a "Judas", which brought him to Bellevue Hospital and Gold's attention.

One of Gold's patients, an upper-middle-class army veteran who wanted to climb the Statue of Liberty in the belief that doing so would release him from the "show", described his condition this way:

I realized that I was and am the center, the focus of attention by millions and millions of people ... My family and everyone I knew was and are actors in a script, a charade whose entire purpose is to make me the focus of the world's attention.

The choice of the name "Truman Show delusion" by the Golds was influenced by the fact that three of the five patients Joel Gold initially treated for the syndrome explicitly linked their perceived experiences to the film.

In 2008, Paolo Fusar-Poli from the British Journal of Psychiatry conducted a study that displayed individuals having signs of delusion. Mark D. Griffiths, a charted psychologist, analyzed this study and concluded that most of the individuals that had this delusion often had underlying illnesses or other medical problems that could have caused this delusion.

Montreal filmmaker Emmanuel Tardif believed his life was like The Truman Show. He did not think his mother was his real mother and killed her in January 2023. He has schizophrenia and was found to be not criminally responsible for killing her.

=== Truman syndrome ===
In the United Kingdom, psychiatrists Paolo Fusar-Poli, Oliver Howes, Lucia Valmaggia, and Philip McGuire of the Institute of Psychiatry in London described in the British Journal of Psychiatry what they referred to as the "Truman syndrome":

[A] preoccupying belief that the world had changed in some way that other people were aware of, which he interpreted as indicating he was the subject of a film and living in a film set (a 'fabricated world'). This cluster of symptoms ... is a very common presenting complaint in individuals ... who may be in the prodromal phase of schizophrenia.

The authors suggest that the "Truman explanation" is a result of the patients' search for meaning in their perception that the ordinary world has changed in some significant but inexplicable way.

== Medical relevance ==
The Truman Show delusion is not officially recognized and is not a part of the Diagnostic and Statistical Manual of the American Psychiatric Association. The Golds do not say that it is a new diagnosis but refer to it as "a variance on known persecutory and grandiose delusions".

== Filmmaker's reaction ==
After hearing about the condition, Andrew Niccol, writer of The Truman Show, said, "You know you've made it when you have a disease named after you."

== See also ==
- Dream argument
- Five minute hypothesis
- Frank Chu
- Matrix hypothesis
- Matrix defense
- Problem of other minds
- Solipsism
