= C. B. Muthamma =

Indian civil servant and diplomat

Chonira Belliappa Muthamma
- ಚೋನಿರ ಬೆಳ್ಯಪ್ಪ ಮುತ್ತಮ್ಮ

Personal details
- Born: 24 January 1924 Virajpet, Karnataka
- Died: 14 October 2009 (aged 85) Bangalore, Karnataka
- Education: Women's Christian College; Presidency College, Chennai

Military service
- Allegiance: India
- Years of service: 1949–1982
- Rank: Ambassador

Chonira Belliappa Muthamma (24 January 1924 – 14 October 2009) was the first woman to clear the Indian Civil Services examinations. She was also the first woman to join the Indian Foreign Service. She was the first Indian woman diplomat as well. Later, she became the first Indian woman Ambassador (or High Commissioner) also. She is remembered for her successful crusade for gender equality in the Indian Civil Services.

== Early life ==
Chonira Belliappa Muthamma was born on 24 January 1924 in Virajpet in Coorg. Her father, who was a forest officer, died when she was nine years old. Muthamma's mother committed herself to the cause of getting the best education her four children. Muthamma completed her schooling in St.Joseph's Girls School in Madikeri, and graduated from the Women's Christian College, Chennai (Madras at that point) with a triple gold medal. She then attained a Master of Arts degree in English Literature from Presidency College. Muthamma became the first woman to join the Indian Civil Services by clearing the UPSC examination in 1948. She finished at the top of the list of candidates who has applied for the Indian Foreign Service that year and went on to join the service in 1949. When she entered the service, Muthamma was made to sign an undertaking that she would resign from her job once she got married.

== Career ==
Muthamma was first posted to the Indian Embassy at Paris. She also went on to serve as a diplomat in Rangoon, London, and on the Pakistan and America Desks in the Ministry of External Affairs in New Delhi. She was appointed India's Ambassador to Hungary in 1970. She thus became the first woman from within the service to be appointed Ambassador. Later, she served as ambassador in Accra in Ghana, and afterwards she was made the Indian Ambassador to The Hague in the Netherlands.

== Crusade for gender equality ==
Muthamma is known for her successful crusade for gender equality in the Indian Civil Service. The Indian Ministry for external affairs had not promoted CB Muthamma to the post of foreign secretary. Muthamma had to take the Ministry of External Affairs to court when she was denied promotion to Grade I of the service on grounds of "merit". She petitioned the government, claiming that she had been overlooked for promotion and that the rules governing the employment were discriminatory. The Ministry promptly promoted her, hoping that the Supreme Court would dismiss the case. The Supreme Court dismissed the case only after ruling that the issues raised by the petitioner could not be dismissed. Her case was upheld in 1979 in a landmark judgment by a three-member Bench headed by Justice V.R. Krishna Iyer which emphasized "the need to overhaul all service rules to remove the stains of sex discrimination, without waiting for ad-hoc inspiration from writ petitions or gender charity." This did not deter the then Foreign Secretary, who sent a circular to women officers, threatening to remove them from their posts for seeking "special privileges". One of these alleged special privileges was the women wanting to be with their husbands. These details find mention in her 2003 book "Slain by the System". She retired from the IFS in 1982 after 32 years of service.

Justice Krishna Iyer's judgment of Muthamma's case described the Foreign Service as ‘misogynist.’ To show the existence of gender discrimination in the services, Iyer cited Rule 8 (2) of the Indian Foreign Service (Conduct and Discipline) Rules which stated that, "a woman member of the service shall obtain the permission of the government in writing before her marriage is solemnised. Any time after the marriage, a woman member of the Service may be required to resign from Service, if the government is satisfied that her family and domestic commitments are likely to come in the way of due and efficient discharge of her duties as a member of the Service." The Supreme Court Judgement ensured that henceforth it was not mandatory for women officers in the IFS to seek government permission for getting married.

== Other notable works ==
After retirement, she became the Indian member of the Independent Commission on Disarmament and Security Issues set up by the then Swedish Prime Minister, Olof Palme. Her last major published work was a collection of essays titled Slain by the System published in 2003 by Viveka Foundation.

Muthamma was also a passionate environmentalist and a culinary enthusiast as well. She had also co-authored a book on Kodava cuisine called 'The Essential Kodava Cookbook'. A known philanthropist, she donated a large tract of personal land, amounting to approximately 15 acres in Delhi, to The Missionaries of Charity where a school for orphans has been started. The week she died she signed a cheque for a library in Gonikoppal High School and for a business management college building in Virajpet in her native place. The manuscript she wrote on her mother as a tribute she owed for all her achievements was ready to be published posthumously.

She died aged 85 at a private hospital in Bangalore in 2009.

== See also ==
- Vikas Swarup
- Navtej Sarna
- Taranjit Singh Sandhu
- Harsh Vardhan Shringla
