= Dany Nobus =

Psychoanalyst

Academic background
- Education: Ghent University (B.A.), (M.A.), (M.Sc.), (PhD)
- Thesis: Seksualiteit in Lacaniaans perspectief : een onderzoek naar de positie van hetsubject in het veld van de seksuele verscheidenheid (1996)

Academic work
- Discipline: Psychology, Psychoanalysis
- School or tradition: Lacanianism
- Institutions: Brunel University of London

Dany Nobus (born 1965) is a professor of psychoanalytic psychology at Brunel University of London, a former chair and current fellow of Freud Museum in London, as well as a founding fellow of British Psychoanalytic Council.

== Life and work ==
Nobus was the receiver of the Sarton Medal (Note: Not to be confused with George Sarton Medal.) for his work on the history of psychology and psychoanalysis from Ghent University, where he started his academic education in 1988. Stijn Vanheule lauded Nobus for the "excellent quality" of his work, upon receiving the medal.

=== Translations ===
Among Jacques Lacan's works, Nobus has translated ‘Lituraterre’ and ‘The Tokyo Discourse’ into English.

== Publications ==
- Nobus, Dany (2017). The Law of Desire: On Lacan's 'Kant with Sade'. Cham: Springer International Publishing. doi:10.1007/978-3-319-55275-0. ISBN 978-3-319-55274-3.
- Nobus, Dany; Quinn, Malcolm (2005). Knowing Nothing, Staying Stupid: Elements for a Psychoanalytic Epistemology (0 ed.). Routledge. doi:10.4324/9780203970256. ISBN 978-1-135-44620-8.

=== Edited volumes ===
- Nobus, Dany; Downing, Lisa, eds. (2018-04-24). Perversion: Psychoanalytic Perspectives/Perspectives on Psychoanalysis (1 ed.). Routledge. doi:10.4324/9780429478239. ISBN 978-0-429-47823-9.
- Nobus, Dany (2018-03-28). Nobus, Dany (ed.). Key Concepts of Lacanian Psychoanalysis (1 ed.). Routledge. doi:10.4324/9780429476402. ISBN 978-0-429-47640-2.

=== Translations ===
- Lacan, Jacques (2013-08-01). "Lituraterre". Continental Philosophy Review. 46 (2): 327–334. doi:10.1007/s11007-013-9259-8. ISSN 1573-1103.

=== Articles ===
- Libbrecht, Katrien; Nobus, Dany (2015-04-02). "De Franse connectie". Tijdschrift voor Psychoanalyse (in Dutch). 3 (3). Boom uitgevers Amsterdam. ISSN 1382-516X.
