= Eleanor McDougall =

Eleanor McDougall (1873–1956) was a Resident Lecturer in Classics at Westfield College, London from 1902, and later one of the pioneers in women's education in India.

She was born in Manchester, and educated at Manchester High School for Girls and the Moravian School in the Black Forest. She passed her London Matriculation in 1892. In 1893, she entered Royal Holloway College, and in 1894 passed the London Intermediate Arts course, achieving Latin Honours Class II and German Honours Class I. During her time at Royal Holloway College, McDougall was awarded several scholarships and awards, including an Entrance Scholarship in 1893, a Founder's Scholarship for Classics in 1895, and the Driver Prize in Latin Prose in 1895 and 1896. She was also awarded the Gilchrist Medal and Prize for Class I Honours in Classics in 1896. The University of London awarded her M.A. in Classics in 1897, and in that same year she went on to pursue postgraduate research in archaeology at Cambridge. Many years later, in 1926, she was awarded her D.Litt. From 1915, she was the First Principal of the Women's Christian College in Madras, Madras Presidency in British India.
