= Psychiatry Research: Neuroimaging =

- Discipline: Neuroimaging
- Language: English
- Edited by: M.S. Buchsbaum, K. Maurer, T. Dierks, A. Pfefferbaum

Publication details
- Publisher: Elsevier
- Frequency: Monthly
- Impact factor: 2.964 (2011)

Standard abbreviations
- ISO 4: Psychiatry Res. Neuroimaging

Indexing
- CODEN: PSREEK
- ISSN: 0925-4927
- OCLC no.: 33489041

Links
- Journal homepage; Online access; Online archive

Psychiatry Research: Neuroimaging is a peer-reviewed medical journal and an official publication of the International Society for Neuroimaging in Psychiatry. It is a section of the journal Psychiatry Research. The editors-in-chief are M.S. Buchsbaum, K. Maurer, T. Dierks, and A. Pfefferbaum, and it is published by Elsevier. The journal covers applications of neuroimaging in psychiatric research and clinical practice. According to the Journal Citation Reports, the journal has a 2011 impact factor of 2.964.

== See also ==
- List of psychiatry journals
