= Sophia Frangou =

Greek psychiatrist

- Σοφία Φράγκου
- Born: Athens, Greece
- Education: National and Kapodistrian University of Athens
- Scientific career
- Fields: Psychiatry, neuroscience
- Workplaces: Icahn School of Medicine at Mount Sinai

Sophia Frangou (Greek: Σοφία Φράγκου) is a professor of psychiatry at the Icahn School of Medicine at Mount Sinai where she heads the Psychosis Research Program. She is a Fellow of the Royal College of Psychiatrists and vice-chair of the RCPsych Panamerican Division. She is a Fellow of the European Psychiatric Association (EPA) and of the American Psychiatric Association (APA). She served as vice-president for Research of the International Society for Bipolar Disorders from 2010 to 2014. She has also served on the Council of the British Association for Psychopharmacology. She is founding member of the EPA NeuroImaging section and founding chair of the Brain Imaging Network of the European College of Neuropsychopharmacology. She is one of the two Editors of European Psychiatry, the official Journal of the European Psychiatric Association.

== Biography ==
Frangou graduated from the Medical School of the University of Athens, Greece in 1989. She then moved to the UK where she trained in psychiatry at the Maudsley Hospital, London. She obtained her master's degree in neuroscience from the University of London, UK and trained in the US as a research fellow at the Department of Psychiatry and Behavioural Sciences at the Johns Hopkins University She returned to the Institute of Psychiatry, King's College London where she completed her PhD on neuroimaging and electrophysiological markers of familial vulnerability to schizophrenia. Between 1997 and 2013 she worked as a Consultant Psychiatrist at the Maudsley Hospital and led her own research group at the Institute of Psychiatry, Psychology and Neuroscience, King's College London.

== Research ==
Frangou's research focuses on the pathophysiological processes underlying psychosis, with emphasis on schizophrenia and bipolar disorder using clinical, genetic, cognitive and neuroimaging techniques. Her key contributions in the field relate to the neuroimaging correlates of disease risk, expression and resilience and on the functional impact of susceptibility genes for schizophrenia and bipolar disorder on brain structure, connectivity and plasticity.

In parallel Frangou is also interested in the standardisation of neuroimaging measures to capture normal variation across the lifespan and to guide diagnosis, prognosis and treatment response. She currently co-chairs the ENIGMA Lifespan Working Group that examines normal variation in brain structure in over 10,000 healthy people aged 2–92 years.

== Recent publications ==
- Dima, D.; Friston, K. L.; Stephan, K.; Frangou, S. (2015). "Neuroticism and conscientiousness respectively constrain and facilitate short-term plasticity within the working memory neural network". Human Brain Mapping. 36 (10): 4158–63. doi:10.1002/hbm.22906. PMC 4863074. PMID 26189566.
- Delvecchio, G.; Dima, D.; Frangou, S. (2015). "The effect of ANK3 bipolar-risk polymorphisms on the working memory circuitry differs between loci and according to risk-status for bipolar disorder" (PDF). Am J Med Genet B. 168 (3): 188–196. doi:10.1002/ajmg.b.32294. PMID 25711502. S2CID 32513209.View article here
- Rocha-Rego, V.; Jogia, D.; Marquand, AF.; Mourao-Miranda, J.; Simmons, A.; Frangou, S. (2014). "Examination of the predictive value of structural magnetic resonance scans in bipolar disorder: a pattern classification approach". Psychol Med. 44 (3): 519–32. doi:10.1017/S0033291713001013. PMC 3880067. PMID 23734914.
- Dima, D.; Stephan, KE.; Roiser, JP.; Friston, KJ.; Frangou, S. (2011). "Effective Connectivity during Processing of Facial Affect: Evidence for Multiple Parallel Pathways". J Neurosci. 31 (40): 14378–14385. doi:10.1523/JNEUROSCI.2400-11.2011. PMC 6623650. PMID 21976523.
- Roussos, P.; Katsel, P.; Davis, KL.; Bitsios, P.; Giakoumaki, SG.; Jogia, J.; Rozsnyai, K.; Collier, D.; Frangou, S.; Frangou, S.; Siever, LJ.; Haroutunian, V. (2011). "Molecular and Genetic Evidence for Abnormalities in the Nodes of Ranvier in Schizophrenia". Arch Gen Psychiatry. 14 (8 Suppl 4): IV44–50, discussion IV51–5. doi:10.1001/archgenpsychiatry.2011.110. PMID 1893642.
- Sugranyes, G.; Kyriakopoulos, M.; Corrigall, R.; Taylor, E.; Frangou, S. (2011). "Autism spectrum disorders and schizophrenia: meta-analysis of the neural correlates of social cognition". PLOS ONE. 6 (140) e25322. Bibcode:2011PLoSO...625322S. doi:10.1371/journal.pone.0025322. PMC 3187762. PMID 21998649.
- Delvecchio, G.; Fossati, P.; Boyer, P.; Brambilla, P.; Falkai, P.; Gruber, O.; Hietala, J.; Lawrie, SM.; Martinot, JL.; McIntosh, MA.; Meisenzahl, E.; Frangou, S. (2011). "Common and distinct neural correlates of emotional processing in Bipolar Disorder and Major Depressive Disorder: A voxel-based meta-analysis of functional magnetic resonance imaging studies". Eur. Neuropsychopharmacol. 22 (2): 100–13. doi:10.1016/j.euroneuro.2011.07.003. PMID 21820878. S2CID 2424288.
- Jogia, J.; Dima, D.; Kumari, V.; Frangou, S. (2011). "Frontopolar cortical inefficiency may underpin reward and working memory dysfunction in bipolar disorder". World J Biol Psychiatry. 13 (8): 605–615. doi:10.3109/15622975.2011.585662. PMID 21812622. S2CID 33594381.
- Kempton, MJ.; Salvador, Z.; Munafò, MR.; Geddes, JR.; Simmons, A.; Frangou, S.; Williams, SC. (2011). "Structural neuroimaging studies in major depressive disorder. Meta-analysis and comparison with bipolar disorder". Arch Gen Psychiatry. 68 (7): 675–90. doi:10.1001/archgenpsychiatry.2011.60. PMID 21727252.
- Pompei, F.; Dima, D.; Rubia, K.; Kumari, V.; Frangou, S. (2011). "Dissociable functional connectivity changes during the Stroop task relating to risk, resilience and disease expression in bipolar disorder". NeuroImage. 57 (2): 576–82. doi:10.1016/j.neuroimage.2011.04.055. PMID 21570470. S2CID 9524906.
- Pompei, F.; Jogia, J.; Tatarelli, R.; Girardi, P.; Rubia, K.; Kumari, V.; Frangou, S. (2011). "Familial and disease specific abnormalities in the neural correlates of the Stroop Task in Bipolar Disorder". NeuroImage. 56 (3): 1677–84. doi:10.1016/j.neuroimage.2011.02.052. PMID 21352930. S2CID 11137554.
- Jogian, J.; Ruberto, G.; Lelli-Chiesa, G.; Vassos, E.; Maierú, M.; Tatarelli, R.; Girardi, P.; Collier, D.; Frangou, S. (2011). "The impact of the CACNA1C gene polymorphism on frontolimbic function in bipolar disorder". Mol Psychiatry. 16 (11): 1070–1. doi:10.1038/mp.2011.49. PMID 21519340.
- Ruberto, G.; Vassos, E.; Lewis, C. M.; Tatarelli, R.; Girardi, P.; Collier, D.; Frangou, S. (2011). Yoshikawa, Takeo (ed.). "The Cognitive Impact of the ANK3 Risk Variant for Bipolar Disorder: Initial Evidence of Selectivity to Signal Detection during Sustained Attention". PLOS ONE. 6 (1) e16671. Bibcode:2011PLoSO...616671R. doi:10.1371/journal.pone.0016671. PMC 3031622. PMID 21304963.
- Perrier, E.; Pompei, F.; Ruberto, G.; Vassos, E.; Collier, D.; Frangou, S. (2011). "Initial evidence for the role of CACNA1C on subcortical brain morphology in patients with bipolar disorder". Eur Psychiatry. 26 (3): 135–137. doi:10.1016/j.eurpsy.2010.10.004. PMID 21292451. S2CID 31280962.
- Forcada, I.; Papachristou, E.; Mur, M.; Jogia, J.; Reichenberg, A.; Vieta, E.; Frangou, S.; Frangou, Sophia (2010). "The impact of general intellectual ability and white matter volume on the functional outcome of patients with Bipolar Disorder and their relatives". J Affect Disord. 130 (3): 413–420. doi:10.1016/j.jad.2010.10.048. PMID 21112093.
- Lelli-Chiesa, G.; Kempton, M. J.; Jogia, J.; Tatarelli, R.; Girardi, P.; Powell, J.; Collier, D. A.; Frangou, S. (2010). "The impact of the Val158Met catechol- O-methyltransferase genotype on neural correlates of sad facial affect processing in patients with bipolar disorder and their relatives" (PDF). Psychol Med. 41 (4): 1–10. doi:10.1017/S0033291710001431. PMID 20667170. S2CID 206251638.
- Kumar, C.T.S.; Christodoulou, T.; Vyas, N.S.; Kyriakopoulos, M.; Corrigall, R.; Reichenberg, A.; Frangou, S. (2010). "Deficits in visual sustained attention differentiate genetic liability and disease expression for Schizophrenia from Bipolar Disorder". Schiz Res. 124 (1–3): 152–160. doi:10.1016/j.schres.2010.07.006. PMID 20674278. S2CID 32619172.
- Kempton, M. J.; Haldane, M.; Jogia, J.; Grasby, P. M.; Collier, D.; Frangou, S. (2009). "Dissociable Brain Structural Changes Associated with Predisposition, Resilience, and Disease Expression in Bipolar Disorder". J Neurosci. 29 (35): 10863–8. doi:10.1523/JNEUROSCI.2204-09.2009. PMC 6665540. PMID 19726644.
- Kempton, M. J; Ruberto, G.; Vassos, E.; Tatarelli, R.; Girardi, P.; Collier, D.; Frangou, S. (2009). "Effects of the CACNA1C Risk Allele for Bipolar Disorder on Cerebral Gray Matter Volume in Healthy Individuals". Am J Psychiatry. 166 (12): 1413–4. doi:10.1176/appi.ajp.2009.09050680. PMID 19952088.
- Kyriakopoulos, M.; Perez-Iglesias, R.; Woolley, J. B.; Kanaan, R. A. A.; Vyas, N. S.; Barker, G. J.; Frangou, S.; McGuire, P. K. (2009). "Effect of age at onset of schizophrenia on white matter abnormalities". British Journal of Psychiatry. 195 (4): 346–53. doi:10.1192/bjp.bp.108.055376. PMID 19794204.
- Stefanopoulou, Evgenia; Manoharan, Andiappan; Landau, Sabine; Geddes, John R.; Goodwin, Guy; Frangou, Sophia (2009). "Cognitive functioning in patients with affective disorders and schizophrenia: A meta-analysis". International Review of Psychiatry. 21 (4): 336–56. doi:10.1080/09540260902962149. PMID 20374148. S2CID 19858364.
- Burke, L; Androutsos, C; Jogia, J; Byrne, P; Frangou, S (2008). "The Maudsley Early Onset Schizophrenia Study: The effect of age of onset and illness duration on fronto-parietal gray matter". Eur Psychiatry. 23 (4): 233–6. doi:10.1016/j.eurpsy.2008.03.007. PMID 18541416. S2CID 35015489.

== See also ==
- Institute of Psychiatry
- Maudsley Hospital
- International Society for Bipolar Disorders
- Icahn School of Medicine at Mount Sinai
