= FactorDaily =

Indian digital media publication

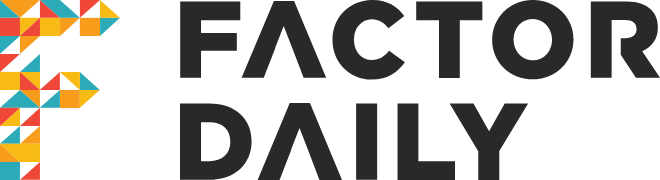
- Industry: News Media
- Founded: 2016
- Founder: Pankaj Mishra; Jayadevan PK
- Headquarters: India
- Parent: SourceCode Media Private Limited
- Website: factordaily.com

FactorDaily is an Indian digital media publication founded in 2016 by Pankaj Mishra and Jayadevan PK. Mishra was formerly an Editor at TechCrunch and the Economic Times. The digital publication was launched with an intent to produce stories on the impact of technology on life in India.

== History ==
FactorDaily began publishing in May 2016, with daily reported stories on technology, culture and life in India.

Prior to its launch, the company had raised $1 million in seed funding from Accel India, Blume Ventures, Girish Mathrubootham of Freshdesk, Vijay Shekhar Sharma of PayTm, and Jay Vijayan of Tekion.

Josey Puliyenthuruthel John, formerly Managing Editor at Business Today and National Corporate Editor at Mint, later joined the company as a Consulting Editor.

In January 2017, FactorDaily launched its first Podcast called The Outliers. The inaugural episode featured a conversation with Manish Sharma of Printo on his journey starting up.

== Awards ==
- The FactorDaily team won the Bengaluru Editors Lab 2017, a journalism hackathon organised by the Global Editors Network (GEN).
- The story titled "India has 3,800 psychiatrists for 1.2bn people. Can tech step in to manage mental health?" won the first prize in the online category of the fifth Schizophrenia Research Foundation’s (SCARF) ‘Media for Mental Health’ awards.
- The story titled 'The dark hand of tech that stokes sex trafficking in India', won the Stop Slavery media Awards by the Thomson Reuters Foundation for the year 2020.
