= Shekinah Jacob =

Indian playwright

- Born: 1978 or 1979 (age 46–47)

Shekinah Jacob is an International playwright who has participated in the Edinburgh Fringe and collaborated with the Royal Court Theatre.

Her notable works include the plays Ali J, The Long Way Home, and Queen of Hearts. She is also known for her monologue We Are Water, which was presented on BBC Radio. Jacob runs Open House Productions, a theatre company based in New Zealand and Bengaluru, which has staged over 60 performances of short plays for corporate events, conferences, and various institutions across the world.

== Early life ==
In an interview with The Hindu, Jacob mentioned that playwriting came naturally to her from a young age. After graduating from Women's Christian College, she worked at various times as a reporter, copywriter, and technical writer. Jacob is married and has two children.

=== Education ===
Jacob completed her schooling at Ida Scudder School, a secondary school in Vellore. She graduated from Women's Christian College, affiliated with the University of Madras, with a master's degree in English Literature. She later pursued a master's degree in Writing for Performance from the University of London as a Charles Wallace Scholar and subsequently earned a PhD in Theatre from the University of Victoria.

== Career ==
Jacob wrote her second full-length script while studying at Women's Christian College. However, she learned the fundamentals of playwriting during a workshop conducted by Mahesh Dattani and later received training from the Royal Court Theatre in London. Reflecting on her experience in an interview with The Hindu, she said, "I learnt how drama is action. Cause and effect. Your left brain and right brain have to work together."

During her time at Women's Christian College, Jacob was required to write a play without any male actors. She wrote Seven for a Secret, featuring seven female characters. This play earned her an opportunity to participate in a workshop with the Royal Court Theatre in London. The play was performed in Chennai, where it won the awards for Best Script and Best Audience Response.

She participated in a playwriting workshop conducted by Mahesh Dattani, during which she wrote the play Only Women. The play had a rehearsed reading at the British Council.

She also wrote a monologue titled We Are Water, which was broadcast on BBC Radio in September 2003.

Her play The Long Way Home was performed at the National Centre for the Performing Arts (NCPA) and Prithvi Theatre in Mumbai, as well as at the Museum Theatre in Chennai.

Her play Ali J was inspired by a real story. Her brother, a lawyer working with a human rights organisation in Mumbai, told her about a young man who was imprisoned after drugs were planted in his bag. The man spent 10 years in a prison in Mauritius before being transferred to Mumbai. Around the same time, she was asked to write a monologue for the Edinburgh Festival Fringe. "They originally wanted one on Muhammad Ali Jinnah, and realising how little Indian history I knew, I began to read extensively on the subject," she said. After six months of research, she decided to combine the two stories. The play premiered at the Edinburgh Fringe Festival, where it ran for 25 days. It will next open the NCPA Centrestage Festival in Mumbai, after which it will tour across the country.

In an interview with The Indian Express on 25 October 2013, Jacob discussed her inspirations, saying, "I read as widely as possible – my favourite playwrights include Alan Bennett for the brilliant way in which he captures miniature shifts of mood and the textured dynamics of relationships, as well as Tom Stoppard and David Mamet. And, of course, the immortal Shakespeare." According to Jacob, good theatre is like a good democracy—"by the people, of the people, and for the people." She writes plays that she herself would enjoy watching as an audience member. She appreciates plays that are rooted in her own world, believing that theatre should serve as an ongoing dialogue between the audience and the actors.

Shekinah Jacob founded a theatre group, Open House Productions, which operates on a Robin Hood model. It is funded by corporates and well-wishers, with most of the revenue from ticket sales directed towards local NGOs.

In an interview in 2015, playwright Naren Weiss told India-West that his play Censored was inspired by the banning of Jacob's Ali J in multiple cities across India. The play was later filmed as a sketch by the Stray Factory and went viral in India.

== Works ==
=== Theatre ===
Year	Title	Details	Notes
2003	We are water	Monologue	
2012	Goeing 747		
2012	The Long Way Home		
2013	Ali J	25 days at Edinburgh Fringe	
	Seven For a Secret		
	Only Women		
	Queen of Hearts		

- Ali J – Premiered at the Edinburgh Fringe Festival for a three-week run in August 2013 as a Richard Jordan and Evam Entertainment Production.
- The Long Way Home – Produced by Evam Entertainment and directed by Karthik Kumar, with shows at Mumbai, Chennai & Bangalore.
- We are water – This monologue was broadcast on BBC Radio in 2003.
- Seven For a Secret – Won the Best Script prize and Best Audience Response prize at an inter-collegiate theatre festival
- Only Women - this had a rehearsed reading in the British Council.
- Goeing 747 – A comic re-telling of the Christmas story, performed in 2012
