= M. Sarada Menon =

Indian psychiatrist and social worker (1923–2021)

- Born: 5 April 1923; Mangalore, Madras Presidency, British India
- Died: 5 December 2021 (aged 98); Chennai, Tamil Nadu, India
- Occupations: Psychiatrist; Social worker
- Years active: 1951–2021
- Known for: Schizophrenia Research Foundation (SCARF)
- Awards: Padma Bhushan; Avvaiyar Award; State Best Doctor Award; Government of India Best Employer Award; International Association of Psycho-Social Rehabilitation Special Award; Rotary Club for the Sake of Honour Award
- Website: Website of SCARF

Mambalikalathil Sarada Menon (5 April 1923 – 5 December 2021) was an Indian psychiatrist, social worker and the founder of Schizophrenia Research Foundation (SCARF), a Chennai-based non-governmental organization working for the rehabilitation of people afflicted with schizophrenia and other mental disorders. An Avvaiyyar Award recipient, she was a former Madras Medical Service officer and the first woman psychiatrist in India. The Government of India awarded her the third highest civilian honour of the Padma Bhushan, in 1992, for her contributions to society.

== Early life and education ==
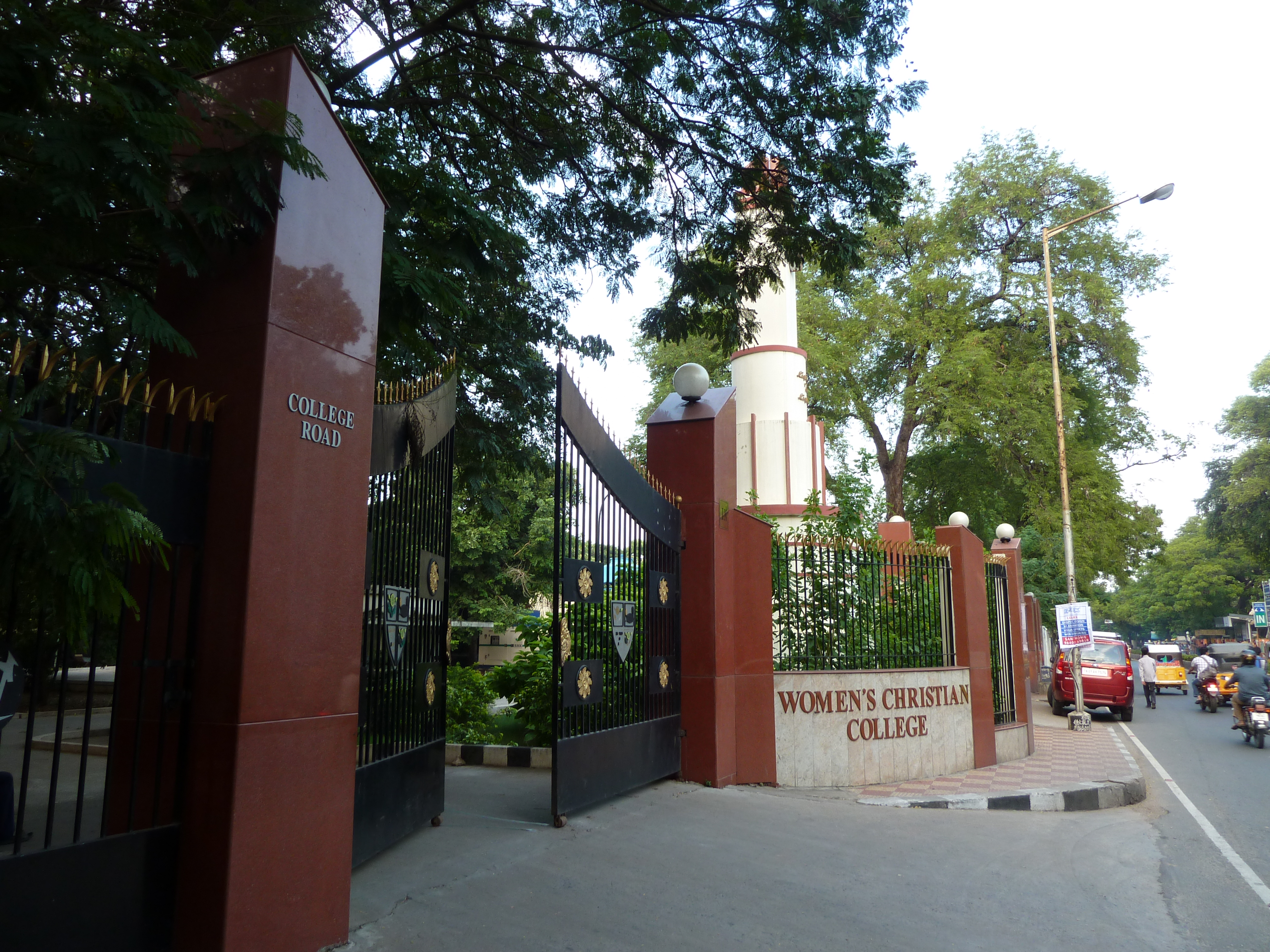
Women's Christian College, Chennai

"These people can be made whole. Mental illness is like any other illness. Response to treatment should not be sidelined from the mainstream of medicine. If treatment is not given properly, relapses occur. About 20 per cent recover well fully, 60 per cent need rehabilitation to come back to original state, 20 per cent do not recover. Even with this 20 per cent one can work on their residual ability and tap their resources to a constructive goal. When we can tolerate a drunkard, why not a schizophrenic? Give affection. Be considerate," says Sarada Menon.

Menon was born in a Malayali family on 5 April 1923 as the youngest of eight children of her parents in Mangalore, a coastal town in the south Indian state of Karnataka. Her father was a judge and when he was transferred to Chennai, young Sarada moved with him for her early schooling at Good Shepherd School and later at Christ Church Anglo-Indian Higher Secondary School after which she graduated from Women's Christian College.

Graduating in medicine from Madras Medical College in 1951, she did her residency at Irwin Hospital, New Delhi (present-day Lok Nayak Jai Prakash Narayan Hospital) before joining Madras Medical Service in 1951 to start her career at Pittapuram Mission Hospital, Andhra Pradesh. She simultaneously studied for the post-graduate degree of MD which she obtained in 1957. Subsequently, she successfully completed the Diploma in Psychiatric Medicine, a two-year course in psychiatry, at the National Institute of Mental Health and Neurosciences (NIMHANS), thus becoming the first woman psychiatrist in India.

== Career ==
Menon joined the Institute of Mental Health (then known as Government Mental Hospital) in Kilpauk in 1959 and superannuated from the institution in 1978. She became its first woman Superintendent in 1961. It was during her tenure, the institution started the department of psychiatry, opened an out-patient facility and established regional psychiatric centres at all the district hospitals in the state. Her efforts have also been reported behind initiating participation of social organizations in the rehabilitation of mentally ill patients. AASHA, a community-based organization assisting the families of mentally-ill people based in Chennai, is one such organization which was started on her initiative. On the personal front, she converted one of the rooms in her residence into a shelter and later influenced the local chapter of YMCA to open palliative care centers; the organization eventually opened three such centers, at Thiruverkadu, Mahabalipuram and Anna Nagar. In 1984, she gathered a few like-minded people and founded Schizophrenia Research Foundation (SCARF), a non-profit non governmental organization, for the rehabilitation of people afflicted with schizophrenia and other mental diseases. Over the years, SCARF has developed into a full-fledged research base and is one of the few Indian institutions recognized by the World Health Organization (WHO) as a Collaborating Center for Mental Health Research and Training. The organization provides temporary shelters and telepsychiatric therapy, runs vocational training centers aimed at the rehabilitation of patients and manages a mobile clinic. They also facilitate employment and conduct awareness campaigns and research projects regularly.

Menon served as the vice-president of the Chennai chapter of the Red Cross Society and was a member of the state government panel set up for proposing prison reforms. She was also associated with the World Fellowship for Schizophrenia and Allied Disorders (WFSAD). The Government of India awarded her the civilian honor of the Padma Bhushan in 1992. She was also a recipient of the Best Doctor Award from the Government of Tamil Nadu, Best Employer Award from the Government of India, Special Award of the International Association of Psycho-Social Rehabilitation, Boston and the For the Sake of Honour Award from the Rotary Club, Chennai. She was also a recipient of the Lifetime Achievement Award of Madras Neuro Trust in 2013. In 2016, the Government of Tamil Nadu honored her again with Avvaiyyar Award.

== Personal life ==
Menon died in Chennai on 5 December 2021, at the age of 98.
