= Psychiatry Research =

- Discipline: Psychiatry
- Language: English
- Edited by: Lynn DeLisi

Publication details
- History: 1979-present
- Publisher: Elsevier
- Frequency: 21/year
- Impact factor: 11.225 (2021)

Standard abbreviations
- ISO 4: Psychiatry Res.

Indexing
- CODEN: PSRSDR
- ISSN: 0165-1781 (print); 1872-7123 (web)

Links
- Journal homepage; Online access; Online archive

Psychiatry Research is a peer-reviewed medical journal covering psychiatry. It was established in 1979 and is published 21 times per year by Elsevier. A section of the journal, Psychiatry Research: Neuroimaging, covers the discipline of neuroimaging as it pertains to psychiatry. The editor-in-chief is Lynn DeLisi. According to the Journal Citation Reports, the journal has a 2021 impact factor of 11.225.
