= European Psychiatry =

- Discipline: Psychiatry
- Language: English
- Edited by: Andrea Fiorillo, Sophia Frangou

Publication details
- History: 1986–present
- Publisher: Cambridge University Press on behalf of the European Psychiatric Association
- Frequency: Continuous
- Open access: Yes
- Impact factor: 7.156 (2021)

Standard abbreviations
- ISO 4: Eur. Psychiatry

Indexing
- ISSN: 0924-9338 (print); 1778-3585 (web)
- OCLC no.: 24466861

Links
- Journal homepage; Online access; Online archive

European Psychiatry is a peer-reviewed open-access medical journal published by Cambridge University Press on behalf of the European Psychiatric Association of which it is an official journal. It covers all aspects of psychiatry. According to the Journal Citation Reports, the journal has a 2021 impact factor of 7.156.

== See also ==
- List of psychiatry journals
