= The Banyan =

- Founded: 1993
- Founders: Vandana Gopikumar and Vaishnavi Jayakumar
- Type: Nonprofit Organization
- Location: Chennai, India
- Region served: Mental Health, Homelessness, Poverty, Inclusive Living Options
- Services: Mental Health Care
- Website: https://thebanyan.org

The Banyan is a non-governmental organization based in Chennai, India that was founded in 1993 by Vandana Gopikumar and Vaishnavi Jayakumar to cater to mentally-ill and homeless women in the city.

This includes the Emergency Care and Recovery Center offered in hospital-based settings, the Center for Mental Health and Inclusive Development promoting the Home Again model and the Center for Social Needs and Livelihood.

== Services ==
The Government of Tamil Nadu - National Health Mission plans to set up multiple new emergency care and recovery centres for individuals with mental illness, both those who are homeless and those who are not. The Banyan will act as capacity building partners on this project, and will also share the protocols and values of their emergency care and recovery services, so that they will be replicated in these new centres.

The Banyan is currently part of a collaborative project (along with Tata Institute of Social Sciences, The Hans Foundation and The Government of Kerala) in Kerala to facilitate exit options for long-stay patients in government run mental health centres. Many of the long-stay patients who will be identified through this project will be transferred to Home Again homes within Kerala.

== Awards ==
The Banyan and its founders have acquired several accolades since 1993, including the Stree Shakthi Puraskar Award (Ministry of Women and Child Development) in 2003 G.D. Birla International Award in 2005, The Sat Paul Mittal National Award, 2007, AmeriCares Spirit of Humanity Awards, 2011, Swiss Foundation award with WHO in 2012 Sitaram Jindal Award, 2012, WHO Public Health Champion Award (India), 2017, and the University of Pennsylvania Nursing Renfield Foundation Award for Global Women's Health in 2018.
