= Louise Howard (psychiatrist) =

British psychiatrist

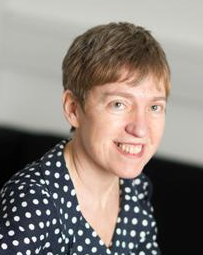
King's College portrait, 2013

Louise Michele Howard OBE is a British psychiatrist. She is an Emeritus Professor of Women's Mental Health, King's College London. Howard's research includes medication in pregnancy, violence and health and the effectiveness and cost-effectiveness of perinatal mental health services. She is an Honorary Consultant Perinatal Psychiatrist with South London and Maudsley NHS Foundation Trust.

Howard is Chair of the NICE National Collaborating Centre for Mental Health Guideline Development Group on Antenatal and Postnatal Mental Health and a member of the International Editorial Board of the British Journal of Psychiatry. In 2019 she became a Senior Investigator at the National Institute for Health and Care Research (NIHR).

Howard was appointed Officer of the Order of the British Empire (OBE) in the 2023 Birthday Honours for services to women's mental health.

== Bibliography ==
- Howard, Louise (2008), Camberwell Assessment of Need for Mothers (CAN-M) : a needs-based assessment for pregnant women and mothers with severe mental illness, Royal College of Psychiatrists, ISBN 978-1435674615
- Howard, Louise M; Feder, Gene; Agnew-Davies, Roxane (2013), Domestic violence and mental health, Royal College of Psychiatrists, ISBN 978-1908020567
