= Shoba Narayan (writer) =

Indian author

Shoba Narayan is an Indian author, journalist and columnist. She wrote the award-winning Monsoon Diary: A Memoir with Recipes (2003). She is the author of four books.

== Biography ==
She received her Bachelor of Science in Psychology from Women's Christian College. She studied fine arts as a Foreign Fellow at Mount Holyoke College and received a Master of Arts from the Columbia University Graduate School of Journalism.

She has published four books. She contributes to a regular column for the Hindustan Times Brunch magazine. She has previously contributed to Indian financial daily, Mint and Abu Dhabi daily, The National.

== Bibliography ==
- The Milk Lady of Bangalore: an unexpected adventure
- Katha: Tell a Story; Sell a Dream (the Art of Corporate Storytelling)
- Monsoon Diary: a memoir with recipes
- Return to India: an immigrant memoir

== Awards ==
- M. F. K. Fisher Award for Distinguished Writing (2001)
