= Eugen Heinz =

German administrator

Eugen Heinz (1889–1977) was a German administrator and president of the Landesarbeitsamt Baden-Württemberg (office for employment of the state Baden-Württemberg) until 1956.

== Life ==
Between 1919 and 1935, Heinz worked in different employment offices in the south west of Germany, until he lost his position due to his refusal to become a member of the Nazi party (NSDAP). He was a member of the Sozialdemokratische Partei Deutschland (SPD). From 1935 to 1945 he worked in Ludwigsburg. After World War II, he was the president of the employment office of the state Baden-Württemberg from 1945 until 31 March 1956. Besides his professional activities, Heinz was active in a southern section (Sektion Schwaben) of the Deutscher Alpenverein (DRV), which he joined in 1920. 1924, he was the head of the Youth Section and from 1929 to 1932 of the Section for Skiing, which was very successful in skiing competitions. This work was interrupted during Nazi rule. From 1953 to 1970, he was the president of the Section Schwaben and the Jamtalhütte in the Silvretta Alps was named after him (Dr. Eugen-Heinz-Hütte) Heinz is the grandfather of the psychiatrist and psychotherapist Andreas Heinz.

== Honors ==
1952: Grand Merit Cross (Großes Verdienstkreuz)
