= Schizophrenia Research Foundation =

Mental health organization in South India

- Stop exclusion; Dare to Care
- Abbreviation: SCARF
- Formation: 1984
- Type: Non-government organisation
- Purpose: Mental Healthcare and Research
- Location: Anna Nagar, Chennai
- Region served: South India
- Chairman: R Seshasayee
- Vice Chairman: Dr. Thara Rangaswamy
- Director: Dr R Padmavati
- Key people: M. Sarada Menon (Founder)
- Affiliations: WHO, MGR Medical University
- Website: www.scarfindia.org

M. Sarada Menon, the founder of the Schizophrenia Research Foundation (SCARF)

Schizophrenia Research Foundation (SCARF) was founded in 1984 with the primary objective of providing quality care and rehabilitation to those suffering from severe mental disorders. SCARF has a Mental Health Center located in Anna Nagar, Chennai, along with two residential rehabilitation centres at Thiruverkadu and Mahabalipuram.

== Research ==
SCARF has been involved in several studies conducted by the World Health Organization. Some of its other collaborating partners in mental health research are, World Psychiatric Association, Johns Hopkins University, King's College London, Oxfam, Indian Council of Medical Research, AIIMS, NIMHANS and TISS. Tamil Nadu MGR Medical University has approved SCARF as a center for doctoral studies in 'Mental health and Social Sciences'. The biennial conference of the foundation, ICONS, draws response from distinguished researchers from all over the world.

== Academics ==
The National Board of Examinations (NBE) has accredited SCARF as the centre for post-graduate training for DNB in psychiatry since 2009. SCARF offers various training and workshop in psychology, social work, nursing and occupational therapy. It offers one year Diploma in 'Mental Health Care and Counselling' in collaboration with NIMHANS and doctoral research (PhD) in mental health in affiliation with the Dr. MGR Medical University.

== Awareness ==
SCARF is involved in promoting mental health awareness and lobbying for the benefits for the mentally ill patients through educational materials, and an International film festival, Frame of Mind, to improve awareness and deal with stigma. The foundation has also initiated a media award for journalists writing on mental health.
