= Stijn Vanheule =

Belgian professor of psychology

Stijn Vanheule (born 1974) is a Belgian clinical psychologist and professor at Ghent University.

== Publications ==
- Vanheule, Stijn (2011). "The Subject of Psychosis: A Lacanian Perspective". SpringerLink. doi:10.1057/9780230355873. ISBN 978-1-349-32529-0.
