= Schizophrenia Research =

- Discipline: Psychiatry
- Language: English
- Edited by: Matcheri Keshavan

Publication details
- History: 1988-present
- Publisher: Elsevier
- Frequency: monthly
- Impact factor: 4.56 (2018)

Standard abbreviations
- ISO 4: Schizophr. Res.

Indexing
- CODEN: SCRSEH
- ISSN: 0920-9964 (print); 1573-2509 (web)
- LCCN: 97640811
- OCLC no.: 17726734

Links
- Journal homepage; Online access

Schizophrenia Research is a peer-reviewed medical journal covering research on the cause, clinical diagnostics, and treatment of schizophrenia. It is an official journal of the Schizophrenia International Research Society and was established in 1988. The editor-in-chief is Matcheri Keshavan and the former editors are Henry Nasrallah (University of Cincinnati) and Lynn DeLisi (Harvard Medical School). According to Schizophrenia Research's original mission statement, the journal is aimed at

bringing together previously separated biological, clinical and psychological research on this disorder, and stimulate the synthesis of these data into cohesive hypotheses.

According to the Journal Citation Reports, the journal has a 2018 impact factor of 4.56

== See also ==
- List of psychiatry journals
- Schizophrenia Bulletin
