= European Psychiatric Association =

The European Psychiatric Association (EPA) is the main association representing psychiatry in Europe.

== History ==
The EPA was founded in October 1983 as the Association of European Psychiatrists (AEP), at the University of Strasbourg, by twelve French- and English-speaking university psychiatrists. The objective of the new organization was to "promote European Psychiatry in the fields of research, treatment and teaching, three axes considered to be unequivocally complementary." An inauguration symposium was held in May 1984. In 1989, the AEP was granted consultant status at the Council of Europe. In 2003, participatory status was gained. In 2008, the name was changed to the present one.

== Journal ==
European Psychiatry is the association's official journal.

== European Brain Council ==
The EPA is a member of the European Brain Council.
