= Schizophrenia Bulletin =

- Discipline: Schizophrenia
- Language: English
- Edited by: William T. Carpenter

Publication details
- History: 1969–present
- Publisher: Oxford University Press on behalf of the Maryland Psychiatric Research Center and Schizophrenia International Research Society
- Frequency: Bimonthly
- Impact factor: 9.306 (2020)

Standard abbreviations
- ISO 4: Schizophr. Bull.

Indexing
- CODEN: SCZBB3
- ISSN: 0586-7614 (print); 1745-1701 (web)
- OCLC no.: 01345919

Links
- Journal homepage; Online access; Online archives

Schizophrenia Bulletin is a peer-reviewed medical journal which covers research relating to the etiology and treatment of schizophrenia. The journal is published bimonthly by Oxford University Press in association with the Maryland Psychiatric Research Center and Schizophrenia International Research Society.

According to the Journal Citation Reports, the journal's 2020 impact factor is 9.306. The front cover of the journal traditionally depicts a work of art by a person with a mental disorder.

The founder and first editor-in-chief of Schizophrenia Bulletin was American psychiatrist Loren Mosher.

== See also ==
- Schizophrenia Research
- List of psychiatry journals
