= Schizophrenia International Research Society =

Mental health research organization

The Schizophrenia International Research Society (SIRS) is an academic organization with a global scope, devoted to the study of schizophrenia and related disorders.

== History ==
The Schizophrenia International Research Society was founded in 2005. The society's first congress was held in 2008.

The 2016 Schizophrenia International Research Society Conference was held in Florence, Italy.

In 2018, Til Wykes was elected president of the society.

The 2019 Congress of the Schizophrenia International Research Society was held in Orlando, Florida. It was the society's first congress in North America.

In 2022, Paola Dazzan was elected president of the society.

== Publications ==
The organization publishes the journal Schizophrenia (in partnership with Springer Nature), the journal Schizophrenia Bulletin (in partnership with Oxford University Press), and the journal Schizophrenia Research.

== See also ==
- Schizophrenia Bulletin
