= Mus =

Mus or MUS may refer to:

== Abbreviations ==
- MUS, the ISO 3166-1 alpha-3 country code for Mauritius
- MUS, the IATA airport code for Minami Torishima Airport
- MUS, abbreviation for the Centre for Modern Urban Studies on Campus The Hague, Leiden University, Netherlands
- MUS, abbreviation for Medically unexplained physical symptoms
- MUS, abbreviation for the Memphis University School
- MUS, abbreviation for the Movimiento Unión Soberanista
- MUS, abbreviation for Multiple-use water supply system, a low-cost, equitable water supply systems
- Mus, abbreviation for Musca, a southern constellation
- mus, ISO-639 code for the Muscogee language
- Mus., abbreviation used in music degrees such as B.Mus. and M.Mus.
- MUs, or million units of energy, used in India for a gigawatt hour
- MUS (МУС), the Belarusian abbreviation of the Ministry of Internal Affairs (Belarus)

== People ==
- Alien Mus (born 1987), Indonesian politician
- Anders Mus (fl. 1501–1535), Danish civil servant in Norway
- Conny Mus (1950–2010), Dutch journalist, best known as a correspondent for RTL Nieuws in Israel and the Middle East
- Gus Mus (born 1944), Islamic leader from Indonesia affiliated to Nahdlatul Ulama
- Italo Mus (1892–1967), Italian impressionist painter
- Paul Mus (1902–1969), French author and scholar of Vietnam and other Southeast Asian cultures
- Publius Decius Mus, three ancient Romans from the same family

== Places ==
- Mus, Gard, a commune of the Gard département in France
- Mus, Lorestan, a village in Lorestan Province, Iran
- Mus, West Azerbaijan, a village in West Azerbaijan Province, Iran
- Muş, a city in Turkey, capital of Muş Province
- Muş Province, an administrative subdivision of Turkey
- Mus, Car Nicobar, a village in India

== Others ==
- Mus (genus), the genus of rodents containing many species of mice
- Mus (Mus), a subgenus of Mus containing the house mouse
- Mus (card game), a Basque card game

== See also ==
- Mu (disambiguation)
- Muse (disambiguation)
