= Basin Focal Projects =

The Basin Focal Projects (BFPs) are a set of CGIAR Challenge Program on Water and Food projects aimed at identifying and catalyzing the implementation of strategic interventions to enhance human and ecological well-being through increases in river basin and local level water productivity.

== Overview ==
The Projects provide strategic research that links project and basin activities with the global demand for improved agricultural water productivity. They do this by analyzing conditions in ten river basins under six work packages.

- Phase I projects commissioned in 2005 include basins of the Mekong, Karkheh, Volta and the Sao Francisco. These four projects have reached completion. They produced valuable insights about the specific nature of the food and water crisis in basins.
- Phase II projects commissioned in 2008 include basins of Indo-Ganges, Andean system of basins, Nile, Niger, Yellow River and the Limpopo and run through 2009.

Research projects are led by the Commonwealth Scientific and Industrial Research Organisation, Australia (CSIRO), University of California, Davis (UC-Davis), Institut de recherche pour le développement (IRD), International Water Management Institute (IWMI), Agricultural Research Council of South Africa (ARC) and are supported by FANRPAN, International Food Policy Research Institute (IFPRI) and King's College London (KCL).

== Methodology ==
BFP analyses are grouped into six work packages:

- water poverty,
- water availability,
- water productivity,
- institutional analysis,
- intervention analysis and
- knowledge management.

Problems of water, food and poverty are explored by asking the following kinds of questions:

- To what extent is water scarce?
- To what extent is water scarcity and access a cause of poverty?
- Who gets access to water and who does not?
- How are such decisions made?
- How efficiently is water used?
- How can it be used more efficiently?
- How can water related interventions (policy changes, institutional innovations, new technologies) help improve food security, livelihood resilience and ecosystem services?
- What are the consequences (for different water users and uses at different scales) of introducing different kinds of changes?
