= Future Harvest Consortium to Rebuild Agriculture in Afghanistan =

The Future Harvest Consortium to Rebuild Agriculture in Afghanistan (FHCRAA) was a consortium of aid organizations working to restructure agriculture in Afghanistan. In January 2002, ICARDA, with the support of USAID, gathered 74 experts from 34 international organizations at a meeting in Tashkent, Uzbekistan. FHCRAA was the result.

The first stage was to identify areas, aid recipients and donor agency capabilities. The most important partners were USAID, CGIAR, ICARDA and ICRISAT.

== See also ==
- Economy of Afghanistan
