= Reema Sathe =

Indian activist

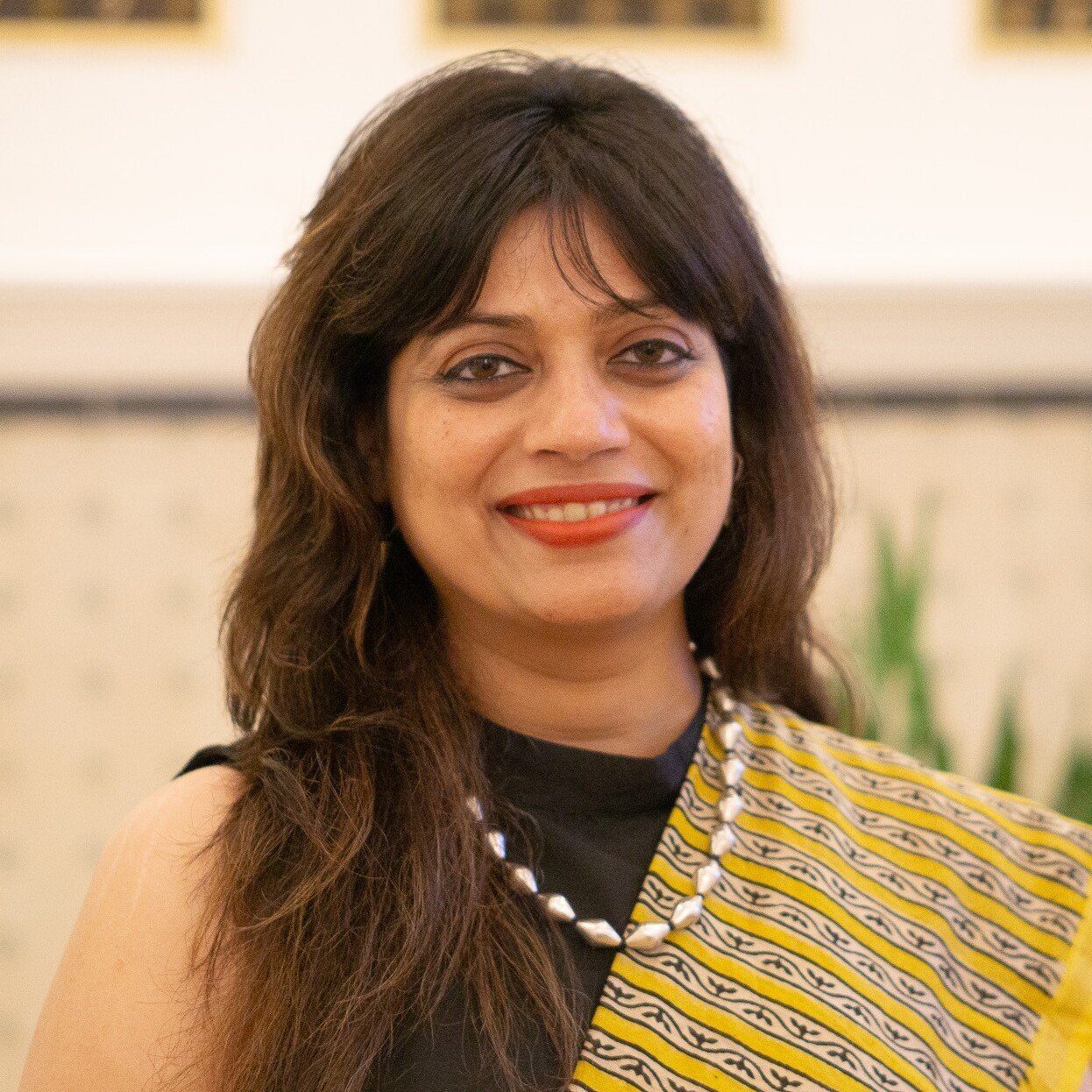
- in 2023
- Education: Somerville College
- Occupations: businessperson and social activist

Reema Sathe (born 20th century) is an Indian chemical engineer and activist. Her snack company, "Manipur's first women-only farmer producer company", promises to share its profits fairly with small farmers. She was awarded the Nari Shakti Puraskar in 2017 for her work by the President of India and later noted for her work in 300 villages, involving 30,000 people, by the International Livestock Research Institute in Nairobi.

== Life ==
Sathe was trained as a chemical engineer.

Having left a steady job in 2014 to become self employed, she started a beverage company, "Happy Roots", after working for seven years in the food and drink industry in 2016. The move was prompted by concerns about the number of suicides amongst small farmers that she learned about while working for a company named "Krishi Star" as a marketing manager.

She tried giving chickens to farmers so that she could then sell the eggs. When the supply line led to breakages and rotten eggs, she changed her focus to non-perishable foodstuffs. In the case of women farmers in Ahmednagar, their income is said to have tripled as they grew buckweat for Sathe's business. She has been credited with involving 16,000 women in pig farming and creating "Manipur's first women-only farmer producer company". Her company's product ranges have included crackers and cookies made from wheat, buckwheat, amarnath seeds, flax seed and barley.

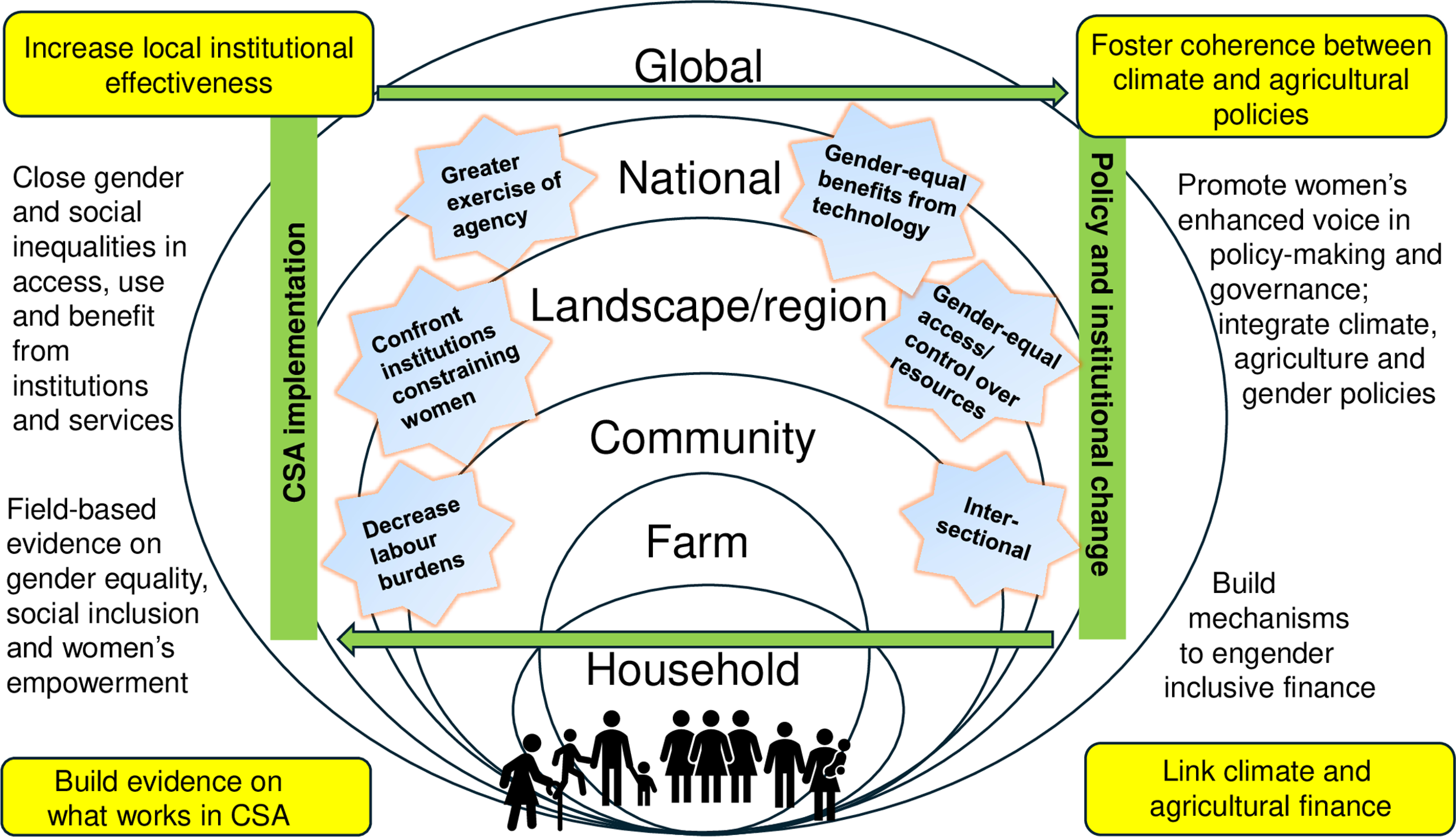
From "Gender, intersectionality and climate smart agriculture in South Asia" by Prof Rao, Sathe et al in 2025

DD India, an Indian Public Services TV company, featured Sathe in their programme "In Conversation" where she described how she was doubling incomes to make people financially secure. She continues to write and the International Livestock Research Institute in Kenya includes her as an expert in Gender with an impact involving 300 villages and 30,000 people. Her research on women farmers and climate change has been included to support her inclusion as "an independent expert".

Sathe went on to be a Cyril Shroff Scholar reading for a master's degree in Public Policy at Somerville College, Oxford.

== Awards ==
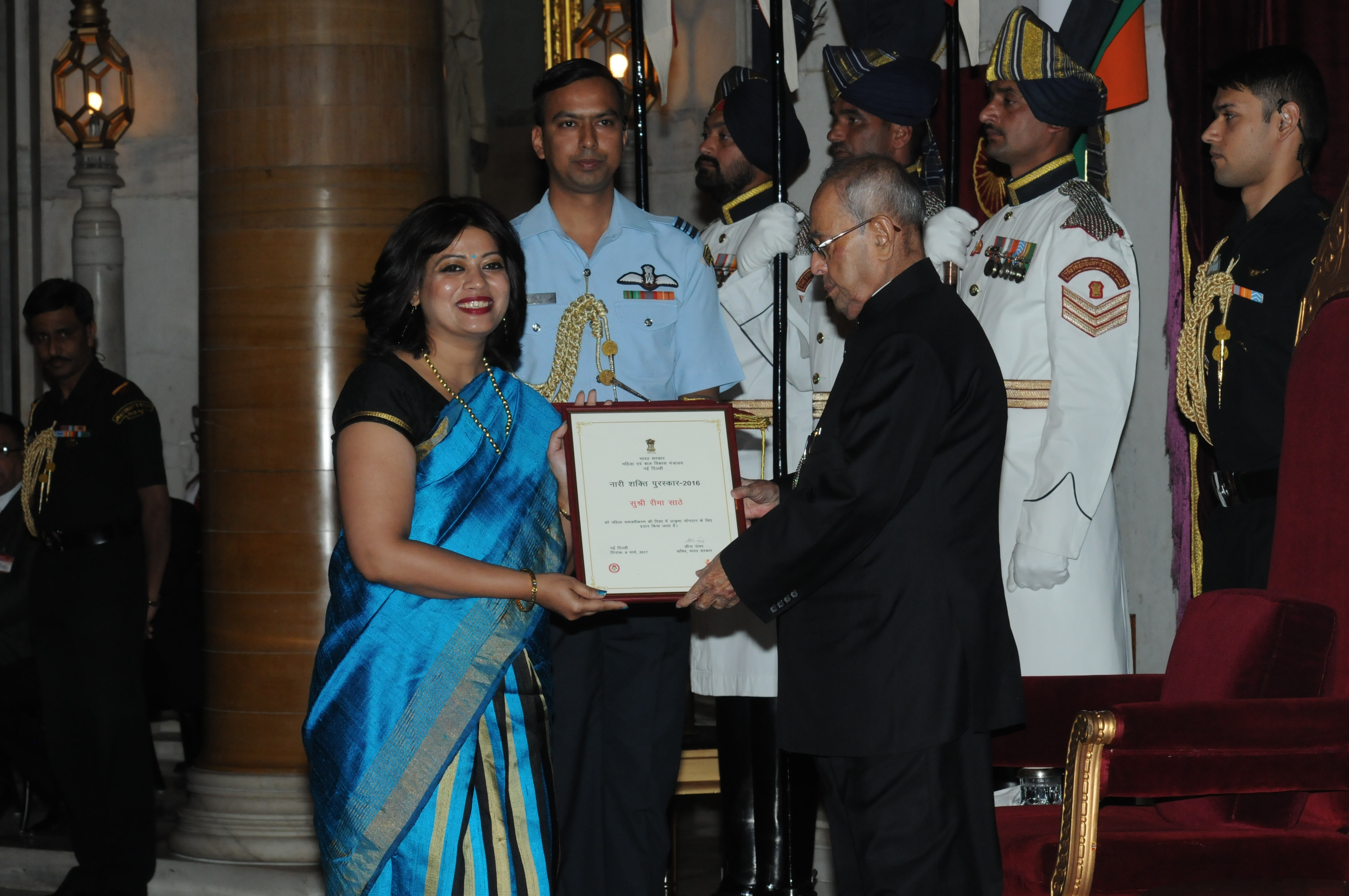
Receiving the Nari Shakti Puraskar in 2017

Sathe was awarded "Business Today"'s "Most Powerful Women" Award in 2017.

Sathe was awarded the 2016 Nari Shakti Puraskar. She was one of 27 women who were recognised and five organisations were also honoured. At the awards she met another award winner Ringyuichon Vashum from Manipur. She would later write about her visit to Manipur to see how she could help the people there.
