= Margaret Okomo Adhiambo =

Kenyan veterinarian and molecular biologist

- Citizenship: Kenya
- Education: Emory University (MPH) University of Nevada (PhD)
- Employer(s): U.S Centers for Disease Control and Prevention (CDC)
- Known for: Infectious Disease Surveillance

Margaret Okomo Adhiambo is a Kenyan veterinarian and molecular biologist. She is a research scientist specialising in influenza virus bioinformatics at the U.S. Centers for Disease Control and Prevention (CDC), Atlanta, Georgia. She is a Fellow of the African Academy of Sciences (AAS).

== Early life and education ==
Margaret graduated from the University of Nairobi with a Bachelor of Veterinary Medicine (DVM) in 1992, and also earned an MSc in Animal Genetics from the same university. She later obtained a PhD in Cellular and Molecular Biology from the University of Nevada, Reno as well as a MPH in Epidemiology from Emory University.

== Career ==
She taught animal genetics courses at the University of Nairobi, while researching the disease resistance genetics of indigenous African livestock. She also worked at the International Livestock Research Institute (ILRI) before proceeding for her doctoral studies in 2001. She joined the CDC after her doctoral and post doctoral studies, where her research focuses on infectious disease surveillance.

== Awards and recognition ==
Over her career, she has authored scientific articles, chapters and technical reports. In 2018, she was elected as a Fellow of the African Academy of Sciences.

== Selected publications ==
- Okomo-Adhiambo, Margaret; Sheu, Tiffany G.; Gubareva, Larisa V. (2013). "Assays for monitoring susceptibility of influenza viruses to neuraminidase inhibitors". Influenza and Other Respiratory Viruses. 7 (s1): 44–49. doi:10.1111/irv.12051. ISSN 1750-2640. PMC 5978623. PMID 23279896.
- Okomo-Adhiambo, Margaret; Fry, Alicia M.; Su, Su; Nguyen, Ha T.; Elal, Anwar Abd; Negron, Elizabeth; Hand, Julie; Garten, Rebecca J.; Barnes, John; Xiyan, Xu; Villanueva, Julie M.; Gubareva, Larisa V.; 2013–14 US Influenza Antiviral Working Group (2015). "Oseltamivir-Resistant Influenza A(H1N1)pdm09 Viruses, United States, 2013–14" (PDF). Emerging Infectious Diseases. 21 (1): 136–141. doi:10.3201/eid2101.141006. ISSN 1080-6040. PMC 4285251. PMID 25532050.
- Okomo-Adhiambo, Margaret; Sleeman, Katrina; Ballenger, Kristina; Nguyen, Ha T.; Mishin, Vasiliy P.; Sheu, Tiffany G.; Smagala, James; Li, Yan; Klimov, Alexander I.; Gubareva, Larisa V. (2010-10-13). "Neuraminidase Inhibitor Susceptibility Testing in Human Influenza Viruses: A Laboratory Surveillance Perspective". Viruses. 2 (10): 2269–2289. doi:10.3390/v2102269. ISSN 1999-4915. PMC 3185571. PMID 21994620.
