= Nizar Haddad =

Nizar Jamal Haddad
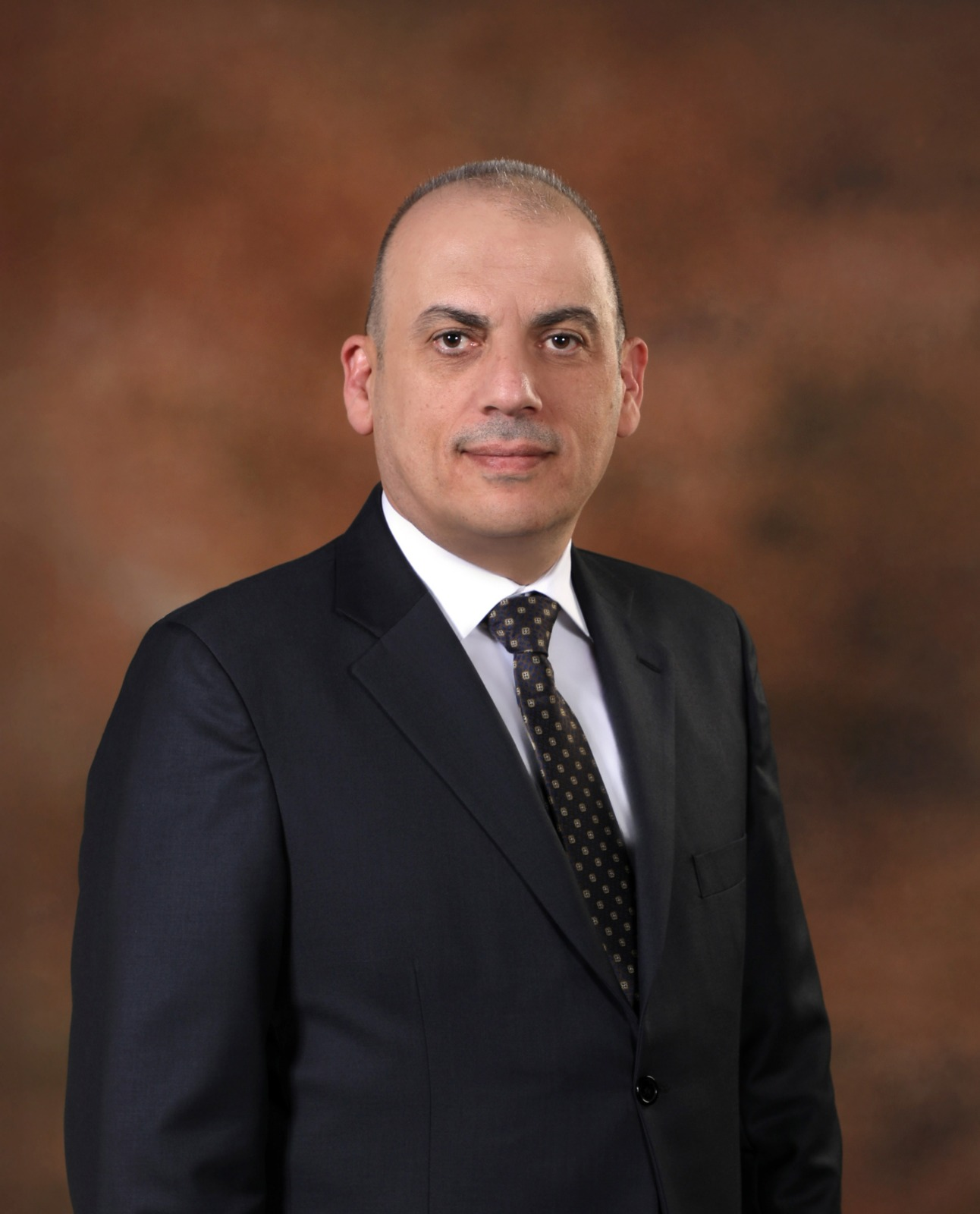
- Born: May 12, 1972 (age 54); Jordan
- Awards: King Abdullah II Award for Excellence
- Scientific career
- Fields: Sustainable agriculture, Food systems
- Workplaces: International Center for Agricultural Research in the Dry Areas; Food and Agriculture Organization (FAO); National Agricultural Research Center (NARC); Fresh Del Monte Produce

Nizar Jamal Haddad (Arabic: نزار حداد) (born 12 May 1972) is a Jordanian agricultural scientist. He has served as Director General of the International Center for Agriculture Research in the Dry Areas (ICARDA) Since 1 October 2026. He previously sereved as Director of the Programme Director of the Food and Agriculture Organization (FAO) in Saudi Arabia since 2025.

Haddad previously served as Director General of the National Agricultural Research Center in Jordan from 2017 to 2024. During his tenure, he received the King Abdullah II Award for Excellence.

His career has included roles in the private sector, including Director of Innovation and Business Development at Fresh Del Monte Produce and General Manager of De L’Ora Bio.

== Career ==
=== Early career ===
Haddad began his professional career in 2000 as a researcher at the National Agricultural Research Center (NARC) in Jordan, where he later became a senior scientist. Between 2000 and 2017, he worked in agricultural and environmental research, including roles as Director of the Bee Research Department.

In 2009, he was involved in the establishment of the Beekeepers' Union of Jordan and served as its president until 2017.

=== Director General of the National Agricultural Research Center (2017–2024) ===
In August 2017, Haddad was appointed Director General of the National Agricultural Research Center (NARC) in Jordan. During his tenure, the center operated through a network of regional research stations and specialized centers across the country, supporting national agricultural research and development activities.

The institution's activities during this period included programs in plant production, natural resource management, and agricultural innovation, as well as the establishment of a National Seed Bank and the development of digital agricultural services.

Among the initiatives during this period was the establishment of the "Agricultural Innovation and Entrepreneurship Incubator", implemented in collaboration with the International Union for Conservation of Nature (IUCN) and partner organizations.

During the same period, Haddad represented NARC in cooperation with regional and international organizations, including the Food and Agriculture Organization (FAO), International Center for Agricultural Research in the Dry Areas (ICARDA), and the Association of Agricultural Research Institutions in the Near East and North Africa (AARINENA).

=== Private-sector career ===
Haddad joined Fresh Del Monte Produce as "Director of Innovation and Business Development".

He also served as General Manager of "De L’Ora Bio".

=== Food and Agriculture Organization in Saudi Arabia ===
Haddad serves as Programme Director for the Food and Agriculture Organization (FAO) in Saudi Arabia.

His work includes engagement in programmes related to sustainable rural development and natural resource management, as well as initiatives related to water-use efficiency and irrigation systems.

Activities in natural resource management include support to the National Center for Vegetation Cover and Combating Desertification (NCVC) in relation to the National Greening Program under the Saudi Green Initiative (SGI), focusing on forest and rangeland management, reforestation, desertification control, and the restoration of degraded lands.

He has also been involved in programmes supporting sustainable rural development under the "Saudi Reef" initiative, including work related to agricultural value chains such as coffee, rain-fed cereals, sub-tropical fruits, roses, beekeeping, fisheries, and livestock.

In the area of food security and governance, Haddad has engaged with national institutions including the Ministry of Environment, Water and Agriculture, the General Food Security Authority (GFSA), the National Center for Sustainable Agriculture Research and Development (Estidamah), and the National Center for Palms and Dates (NCPD), including participation in initiatives related to food loss and waste reduction.

He has also been involved in cooperation with the Saudi Irrigation Organization (SIO).

== Awards and recognition ==
- King Abdullah II Order of Excellence (2024): Awarded by His Majesty King Abdullah II in recognition of NARC's role in agricultural development and job creation.
- Outstanding Secretary-General/Director-General Award (2024): Awarded by the King Abdullah II Center for Excellence.
- El Naser Salah Al Din Award – Creativity Award in Environmental Sciences for Best Ethnobiology Book (2016).
- Khalil Al Salem Award for Scientific Research and Authorship (2019).
- Zarqa University Award – Best Climatic Changes Book for Climatic Changes and Jordanian Food Security (2014).
- Jordan's Outstanding Governmental Employee Award (2009).
- International Honeybee Health Research Award (2007), awarded by Vita-Europe in England.
- Apimondia medals (2005, 2007, 2013).
