= Lindiwe =

South African given names

Lindiwe (Lindani male) is a feminine given name derived from the Nguni word linda, meaning "wait".

- Lindiwe Hendricks (born 1957), South African politician
- Lindiwe Mabuza (1938–2021), South African politician, diplomat, poet, academic, journalist, and cultural activist
- Lindiwe Magwede (born 1991), Zimbabwean association football goalkeeper
- Lindiwe Majele Sibanda (born 1963), Zimbabwean agricultural researcher
- Lindiwe Mazibuko (born 1980), South African politician and musician
- Lindiwe Sisulu (born 1954), South African politician
- Lindiwe Zulu (born 1958), South Africa's Minister of Small Business Development
