= International Center for Tropical Agriculture =

International research institute in Colombia, member of CGIAR

- Abbreviation: CIAT
- Merged into: The Alliance of Bioversity International and CIAT
- Formation: 1967
- Type: Intergovernmental organization
- Legal status: International organization
- Headquarters: Cali-Palmira
- Location: Colombia
- Director General: Juan Lucas Restrepo
- Parent organization: CGIAR
- Website: alliancebioversityciat.org

The International Center for Tropical Agriculture (known as CIAT from its Spanish-language name Centro Internacional de Agricultura Tropical) is an international research and development organization dedicated to "reducing hunger and poverty and preserving natural resources in developing countries". It is based in Palmira, Colombia, where it employs over 300 scientists.

CIAT is one of the 14 agricultural research centers of the CGIAR. In 2019, CIAT joined with Bioversity International (as the Alliance of Bioversity International and CIAT) to "deliver research-based solutions that harness agricultural biodiversity and sustainably transform food systems to improve people’s lives".

== Future Seeds Gene bank ==
CIAT has one of the 11 gene banks of the CGIAR, with a collection of more than 65,000 accessions of three crops: beans (37,000); tropical forages (23,000) and cassava (6,000), from more than 100 countries. With funding from the United Kingdom, the Colombian government and others, in 2022 inaugurated a new facility to host those accessions called 'Future seeds' in which not only expanded its capacity to up to 250,000 accessions, but creating an architectural landmark and environmentally sustainable infrastructure, and a hub for research and learning.

The research conducted at this center includes, as of 2013, a research on developing better varieties of grain legumes. The goals are tolerances to drought, low phosphorus soils, and heat; in addition to improved nitrogen fixation. CIAT coordinated the activities of the Pan-Africa Bean Research Alliance (PABRA) in 29 countries in Sub-Saharan Africa. This effort was supported by the Canadian International Development Agency (CIDA).

== See also ==
- Bioversity International
- International Institute of Tropical Agriculture
