= Comprehensive Assessment of Water Management in Agriculture =

2007 report by International Water Management Institute and Earthscan

Water for food, Water for life: A Comprehensive Assessment of Water Management in Agriculture
- Type: Independent scientific assessment
- Website: www.iwmi.cgiar.org/assessment

The report A Comprehensive Assessment of Water Management in Agriculture was published in 2007 by International Water Management Institute and Earthscan in an attempt to answer the question: how can water in agriculture be developed and managed to help end poverty and hunger, ensure environmentally sustainable practices, and find the right balance between food and environmental security?

== History ==
Compiled after consultation with more than 700 individuals, numerous organisations and networks, it was the first critical evaluation of:

- the benefits, costs and impacts of the past 50 years of water development
- water management challenges facing communities today
- successful methods of managing water in farming around the world.

The assessment confirmed that agriculture consumes more water resources than any other sector. A key finding was that a third of the world's population lives in water-scarce areas. More than 1.2 billion live in areas of physical water scarcity, lacking water resources. Parts of Australia and the United States suffer in this way. A further 1.6 billion people live in areas of economic water scarcity, where there is insufficient human capacity or financial resources for people to effectively make use of the water that is available. Here, sub-Saharan Africa is a good example; there is water in the rivers but no dams or pumps to enable people to use it.

== Trends affecting demands for water ==
The report's authors forecast that the need for water would double within 50 years, due to global population rise, more people choosing to eat a diet of meat and vegetables rather than primarily consuming cereals, and climate change. Generally, about one litre of liquid water gets converted to water vapour to produce one calorie of food. We each consume between 2,000 and 5,000 liters of water every day, depending on our diet and how the food is produced. This is far more than the two to five litres we drink every day. A heavy meat diet requires much more than a vegetarian diet, because water is used to grow food for the animals as well as being used directly to support the livestock. Economic growth fuels changes in diets; for example, per capita meat demand in China has quadrupled over the last 30 years, and milk and egg products are becoming increasingly popular in India. Growing cities, expanding industry and biofuels are increasingly competing for water with expanding agriculture.

== How feeding the future world will be possible ==
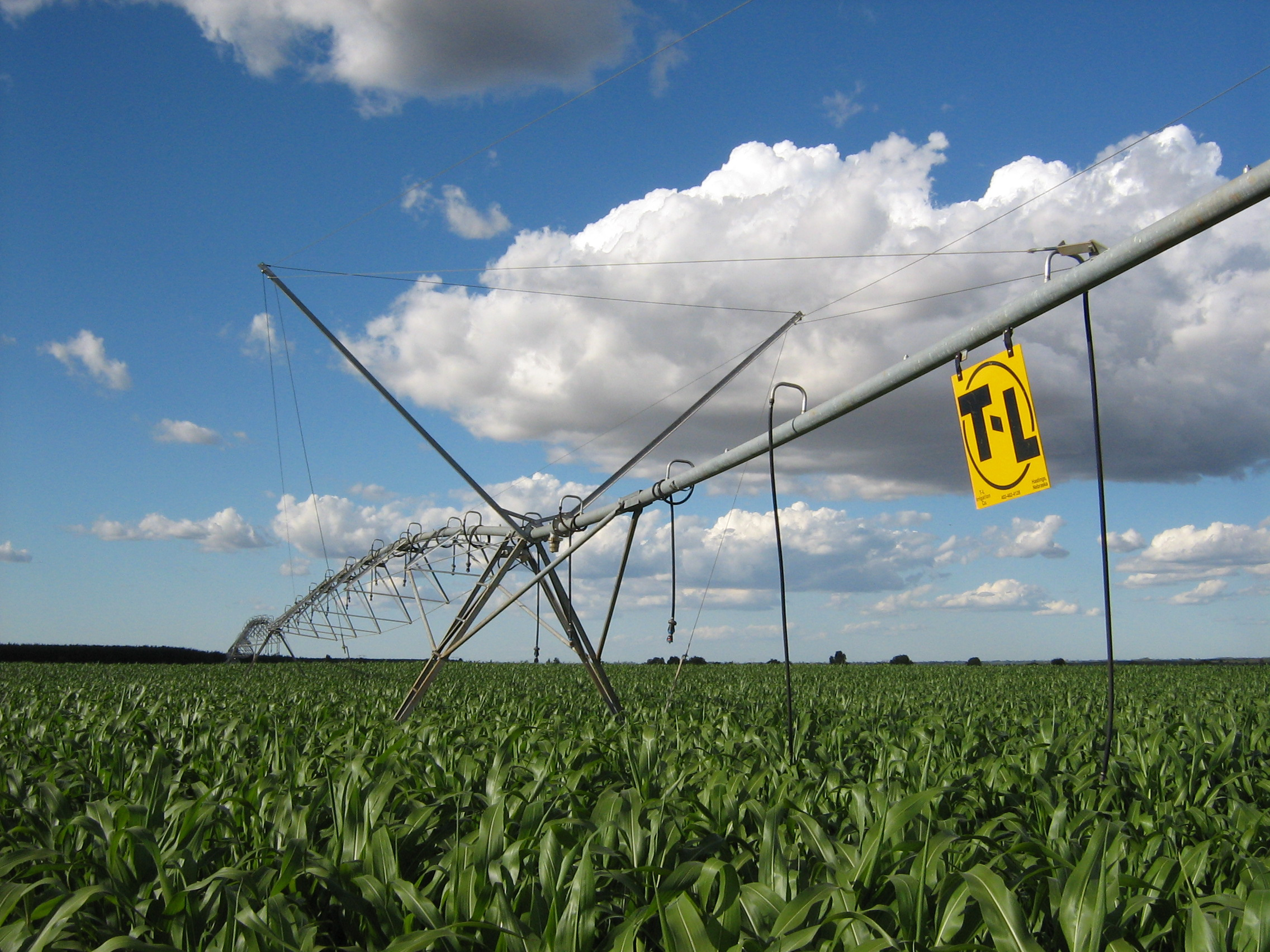
Irrigation water management in a maize field

The conclusion made by the report's authors was that only by changing the way we use water within agriculture would we be able to meet the acute water, environment and poverty challenges facing us over the next 50 years. They suggested that with wise policies and investments in irrigation, upgrading rainfed agriculture, and trade it would be possible to limit future growth in water withdrawals to 13% and the expansion of cultivated land to 9%. However, the effects of climate change and the increased use of biofuels would complicate matters, making actions necessary to address these. The Assessment found the greatest potential lay in rainfed areas of the world housing the highest number of poor people. Upgrading these rainfed lands through better water management held the greatest potential to increase productivity and decrease poverty. The technology would not necessarily need to be complex; simple measures such as catching water in huge tubular plastic bags and storing roof and road run-off could double or even triple food production in sub-Saharan Africa and south-east Asia, effectively increasing productivity from each raindrop by that amount.

== Shaping future water policy ==
The report recommended eight policy actions:

- Change the way we think about water and agriculture. Rain should be viewed as the ultimate source of water to be managed, and agriculture as part of an agro-ecosystem that provides food but also delivers other environmental services, such as maintaining soil fertility.
- Fight poverty by improving access to agricultural water and its use. This would be achieved by promoting livelihood gains by smallholder farmers, for example by securing water access through rights and developing multiple-use water supply systems.
- Manage agriculture to enhance ecosystem services. This would involve using good agricultural practices to enhance other ecosystem services.
- Increase the productivity of water. The outcome would be higher yields and value from smaller volumes of water, thus reducing demand and environmental impacts.
- Upgrade rainfed agriculture by improving soil moisture and using supplemental irrigation. This holds the greatest potential for lifting people out of poverty and increasing water productivity, particularly in sub-Saharan Africa.
- Adapt yesterday's irrigation for tomorrow's needs. Modernisation would require a mix of technological and management upgrades.
- Reform the reform process, targeting state institutions. Water management investments should embrace irrigated and rainfed agriculture, plus fisheries and livestock practices.
- Deal with trade-offs and make difficult choices. Informed multi-stakeholder negotiations would be essential.
