= International Center for Agricultural Research in the Dry Areas =

Lebanese-based research institute

Coordinates: 36.016268°N 36.942801°E

- Founded: 1977; 49 years ago
- Type: International Organization (Research-for-Development)
- Purpose: Food security
- Headquarters: Beirut, Lebanon
- Region served: Worldwide
- Key people: Nizar Haddad, Director General
- Affiliations: CGIAR
- Website: www.icarda.org

The International Center for Agricultural Research in the Dry Areas (ICARDA), a member of CGIAR, supported by the CGIAR Fund, is a non-profit agricultural research institute that aims to improve the livelihoods of the resource-poor across the world's dry areas.

== History ==
ICARDA's origins began in April 1972 when the Technical Advisory Committee of CGIAR (then known as the Consultative Group on International Agricultural Research) expressed interest in agricultural research in the Near East and North Africa. TAC identified the semi-arid winter rainfall zone of the region as an important ecological area with specific crops and significant agricultural challenges which were not adequately addressed by any of the international agricultural research centers at the time. TAC selected Professor Dunstan Skilbeck to head a study during March and April 1973. The Skilbeck Mission recommended the establishment of a new agricultural research center to deal with the agricultural issues of the region. TAC recommended the establishment of an international center in Lebanon.

The eruption of the Lebanese Civil War in 1975 prevented the establishment of a center in Lebanon. The president of Syria Hafez al-Assad who had hoped to secure his own country's agriculture by working with this new institution made an attractive offer of free land for the center to the south of Aleppo. In 1977, ICARDA's headquarters were established in Tel Hadya, Syria.

Today ICARDA's research activities include the development of new crop varieties, water harvesting, conservation agriculture, the diversification of production systems, integrated crop/rangeland/livestock production systems, and the empowerment of rural women.

ICARDA was forced to re-locate again in 2012 due to the Syrian civil war. The center established headquarters in Beirut after leaving Aleppo in 2012.

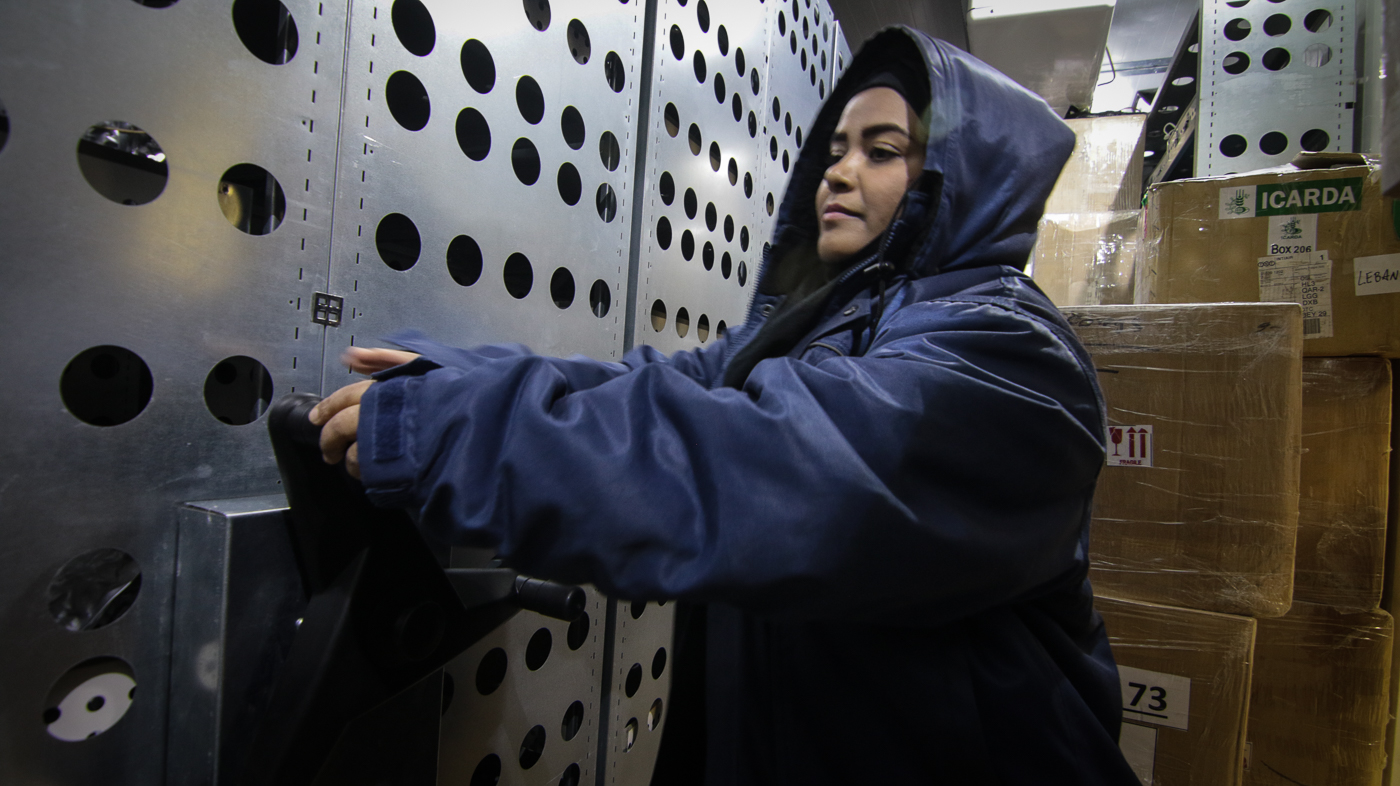
A seed bank at the ICARDA station in Terbol, Lebanon holds around 40,000 seed samples—compared to 150,000 in Syria

== Decentralization ==
ICARDA's decentralization builds on the Center's existing organization.

=== Integrated research platforms ===
As part of its decentralization, ICARDA has established integrated research platforms that address research priorities in each region, but serve dry areas globally through collaboration and partnerships with national programs, advanced research institutions, and other partners in the development and dissemination of international public goods.

The Center has developed four major Platforms, including the headquarters:

Headquarters (West Asia): ICARDA has established temporary headquarters in Beirut, Lebanon, and expanded facilities and activities in Lebanon, Turkey and Jordan.

North Africa, with a Platform in Morocco: Building on the existing partnership with INRA (Institut National de la Recherche Agronomique), and focused on the intensification and diversification of rainfed cereal-based production systems.

Sub-Saharan Africa, with a Platform in Ethiopia: Building on the partnership with ILRI in the CRP on Livestock and Fish and on-going collaboration with the Ethiopian Institute of Agricultural Research (EIAR).

South Asia, with a Platform in India: Building on the existing partnership with ICAR (Indian Council of Agricultural Research), and focused especially on food legumes systems.

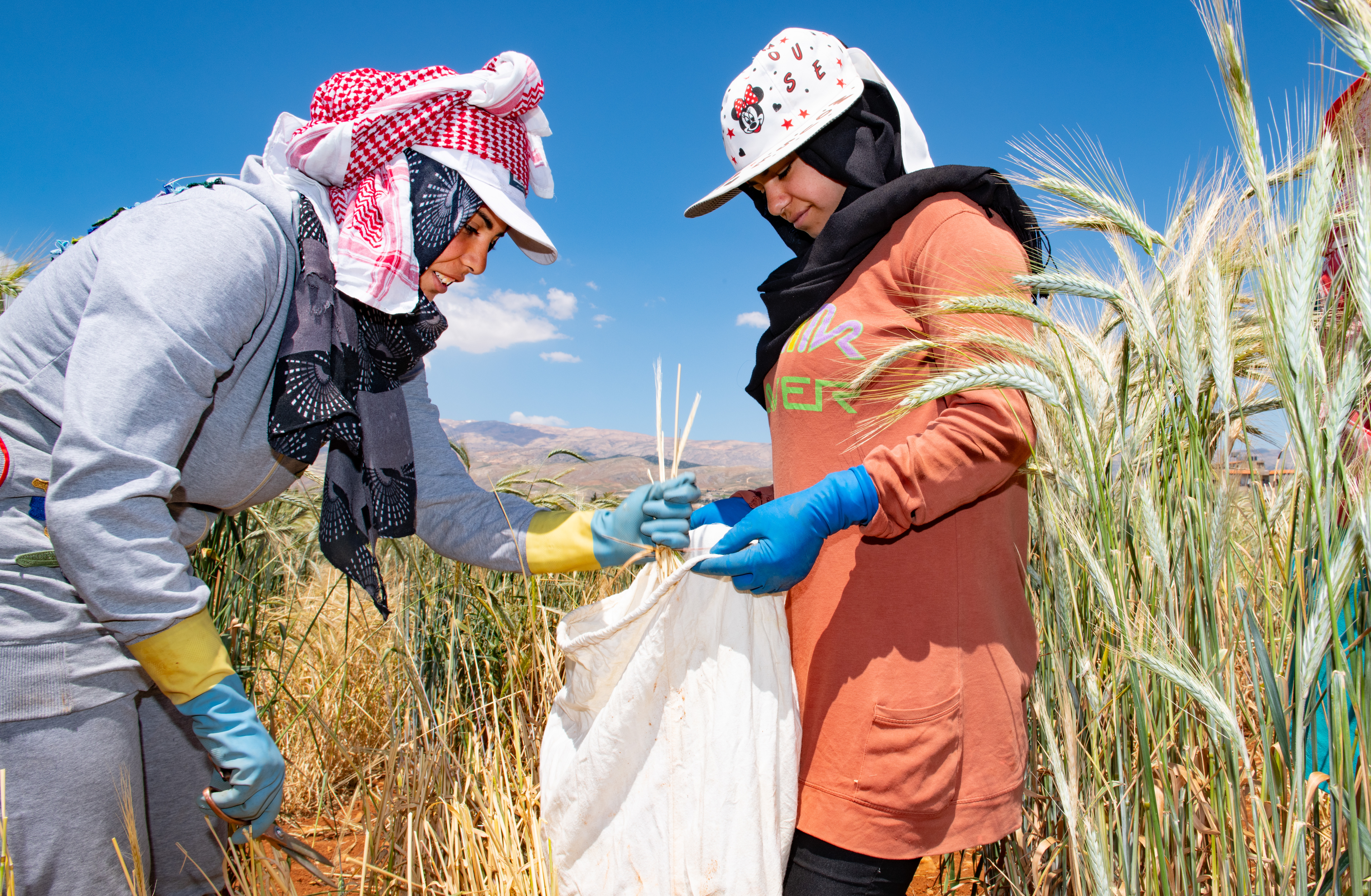
Harvesting wheat at seed regeneration plots at American University of Beirut's AREC station near ICARDA's Terbol station in Lebanon's Beqaa Valley

=== Thematic research locations ===
Under ICARDA's decentralization strategy, the Center is operating four additional research locations with specific themes:

Egypt, for high-input agriculture: a platform with a targeted focus on high-input irrigated agricultural systems, building on collaborative research on irrigated wheat improvement and irrigated systems management.

Turkey, Central Asia and Iran, for Winter Wheat and Winter Barley: a distinct environment with high altitude and highland agro-ecologies with severe winters particularly suitable for breeding winter wheat and winter barley.

Turkey/ICARDA Cereal Rusts Research Center in Izmir: Providing expertise on wheat rusts through the Regional Cereal Rust Research Center within the Aegean Agricultural Research Institute, part of Turkey's Ministry of Food, Agriculture, and Livestock. Founded in 2017.

Sudan Heat Tolerance Research Location: This research location breeds heat-tolerant wheat and food legume varieties, in collaboration with Sudan's Agricultural Research Corporation (ARC)

== Awards ==
- 2015 – Gregor Mendel Award
- 2017 – Olam Prize for Innovation in Food Security
- 2020 – Safaa Kumari, ICARDA's plant virologist, was recognised in 2020 by the BBC for her work in creating virus-resistant plants.

== See also ==
- Future Harvest Consortium to Rebuild Agriculture in Afghanistan
