= Lindiwe Majele Sibanda =

- Born: Lindiwe Majele Sibanda; 1963 (age 62–63); Harare, Zimbabwe
- Occupations: Businesswoman; professor; scientist; policy advocate
- Known for: Leadership at Nestlé

Lindiwe Sibanda Majele (born 1963) is a Zimbabwean professor, scientist, policy advocate and influencer on food systems. She currently serves as director and chair of the ARUA Centre of Excellence in Sustainable Food Systems (ARUA-SFS) at the University of Pretoria in Pretoria, South Africa as well as founder and managing director of Linds Agricultural Services Pvt Ltd. in Harare, Zimbabwe. She is currently a board member of Nestlé where she is also a member of the Sustainability Committee.

== Life ==
Sibanda is a food systems scientist, policy advocate and an influencer on food systems. She has over 25 years of trans-disciplinary work experience in agriculture and rural development, public and private sector policy reforms and management, 15 of them having been at senior level in the academic, scientific, private and public institutions. Sibanda has served as trustee and adviser to numerous international food security related initiatives. She is a serving member of the SDG Target by 2030 Champions 12.3, co-chair of the Global Alliance of Climate-Smart Agriculture, member of the World Vegetable Board, and a commissioner for the EAT-Lancet report on Sustainable Healthy Food Systems. Previously, she has served as a member of the United Nations (UN) Committee for Policy Development (CDP), and the African Union Commission (AUC) Leadership Council; university professor in agriculture, animal sciences and veterinary sciences and is a regular guest lecturer at several universities. She is a recipient of numerous awards for her contribution towards agriculture and food security in Africa; including the, Science Diplomacy Award by the Government of South Africa (2015); FARA Award for Exemplary leadership (2014); and Yara 2013 Prize Laureate; (2013). She holds a BSc Degree Animal Production First Class Honours from the University of Alexandria in Egypt and MSc and PhD, University of Reading, UK. She is currently Director and chairwoman of the African Research Universities Alliance Centre of Excellence in Sustainable Food Systems (ARUA-SFS).

== Awards ==
- Science Diplomacy Award by the Government of South Africa (2015); https://www.fanrpan.org/archive/documents/d01934/
- Forum for FARA Award for Exemplary leadership (2014); https://www.weforum.org/people/lindiwe-majele-sibanda
- Yara 2013 Prize Laureate; (2013) https://www.weforum.org/people/lindiwe-majele-sibanda
- Food Tank recognition as one of the women working to change the food system in honor of International Women's day, https://champions123.org/person/lindiwemajele-sibanda
- Nominated as Global citizen (2012) Nominated as Global citizen https://www.fanrpan.org/archive/documents/d01426/

== Mandates ==
- CGIAR System Board as a voting Board Member 3-year term (2021)
- Nestle Board of Directors (2021)
- Advisory Board Member of Infinite Foods.
- AGRA VP for Country Support, Policy and Delivery (2017)

== Mandates: Not for profit ==
- World Vegetable Centre Board of Directors https://avrdc.org/new-members-appointed-in-2018-to-worldvegetable-center-board-of-directors/
- ILRI board chair (2012) https://newsarchive.ilri.org/index.php/archives/9996
- Board member and chair of the nominations committee, World Vegetable Board.
- Serving member, Champions UN-SDG 12.3, accelerating progress toward reducing food loss and waste towards achieving SDG Target 12.3 by 2030.
- Co-chair, UN-Global Alliance for Climate Smart Agriculture (GACSA).
- Presidential advisory council member on Agriculture in Zimbabwe.
- Deputy Chair of Council for the National University of Science and Technology (NUST).
- Presidential advisory council member. She is currently serving as one of the presidential advisory council members on Agriculture in Zimbabwe
- International Advisory Panel Member, Regional Universities Forum for Capacity Building in Agriculture (RUFORUM).
- 2020 Food Planet Prize: Jury Member
- Cornell University–Nature Sustainability expert panel on "Innovations to build sustainable, equitable, inclusive food value chains", through Cornell Atkinson Center for Sustainability's food security working group, with the journal Nature Sustainability and its sister journal, Nature Food.
- Advisory board member of the ARUA UKRI GCRF- Partnership Programme for Capacity building in Food Security for Africa (CaBFoodS-Africa) hosted by the University of Pretoria, in collaboration with the University of Nairobi, and the University of Ghana, Legon.
- Deputy Chairperson of the Iam4Byo Fighting COVID-19 Trust responsible for communications, public relations and research coalition.

== Publications ==
- 2020. Socio-technical Innovation Bundles for Agri-food Systems Transformation, Report of the International Expert Panel on Innovations to Build Sustainable, Equitable, Inclusive Food Value Chains. Barrett, Christopher B., Tim Benton, Jessica Fanzo, Mario Herrero, Rebecca J. Nelson, Elizabeth Bageant, Edward Buckler, Karen Cooper, Isabella Culotta, Shenggen Fan, Rikin Gandhi, Steven James, Mark Kahn, Laté Lawson-Lartego, Jiali Liu, Quinn Marshall, Daniel Mason-D'Croz, Alexander Mathys, Cynthia Mathys, Veronica Mazariegos-Anastassiou, Alesha (Black) Miller, Kamakhya Misra, Andrew G. Mude, Jianbo Shen, Lindiwe Majele Sibanda, Claire Song, Roy Steiner, Philip Thornton, and Stephen Wood. Ithaca, NY, and London: Cornell Atkinson Center for Sustainability and Springer Nature, 2020
- 2020. Men's nutrition knowledge is important for women's and children's nutrition in Ethiopia. Ambikapathi R, Passarelli S, Madzorera I, et al. Matern Child Nutr. 2021;17e13062.
- 2020. A Chicken Production Intervention and Additional Nutrition Behavior Change Component Increased Child Growth in Ethiopia: A Cluster-Randomized Trial Simone Passarelli, Ramya Ambikapathi, Nilupa S Gunaratna, Isabel Madzorera, Chelsey R Canavan, Abdallah R Noor, Amare Worku, Yemane Berhane, Semira Abdelmenan, Simbarashe Sibanda, Bertha Munthali, Tshilidzi Madzivhandila, Lindiwe M Sibanda, Kumlachew Geremew, Tadelle Dessie, Solomon Abegaz, Getnet Assefa, Christopher Sudfeld, Margaret McConnell, Kirsten Davison, Wafaie Fawzi The Journal of Nutrition, nxaa181.
- 2018 EAT Lancet report with Johan Rockström and Walter Willett. Healthy diets from sustainable food systems. Food in the Anthropocene. Willett W, Rockström J, Loken B, Springmann M, Lang T, Vermeulen S, Garnett T, Tilman D, DeClerck F, Wood A, Jonell M, Clark M, Gordon LJ, Fanzo J, Hawkes C, Zurayk R, Rivera JA, De Vries W, Majele Sibanda L, Afshin A, Chaudhary A, Herrero M, Agustina R, Branca F, Lartey A, Fan S, Crona B, Fox E, Bignet V, Troell M, Lindahl T, Singh S, Cornell SE, Srinath Reddy K, Narain S, Nishtar S, Murray CJL. Lancet. PMID 30660336.
- 2018. Sustainable and Equitable Increases in Fruit and Vegetable Productivity and Consumption are Needed to Achieve Global Nutrition Security. Position Paper resulting from a workshop organized by the Aspen Global Change Institute and hosted at the Keystone Policy Center July 30 – August 3, 2018 https://www.agci.org/sites/default/files/pdfs/lib/publications/AGCI-FV-Position-Paper.pdf
- Sibanda, L. M and Mwamakamba, S.N. (2016) Africa's Rainbow Revolution: Feeding a Continent and the World in a Changing Climate. Solutions, May–June 2016 in press. https://thesolutionsjournal.com/2016/06/17/africas-rainbow-revolution-feeding-continent-world-changing-climate/
- Johan Rockstro ̈m, John Williams, Gretchen Daily, Andrew Noble, Nathanial Matthews, Line Gordon, Hanna Wetterstrand, Fabrice DeClerck, Mihir Shah, Pasquale Steduto, Charlotte de Fraiture, Nuhu Hatibu, Olcay Unver, Jeremy Bird, Lindiwe Sibanda, Jimmy Smith. 2016 .Sustainable intensification of agriculture for human prosperity and global sustainability. Springerlink.com
- Editor in Chief for FANRPAN's AgriDeal Magazine (2015). Climate Smart Agriculture (CSA). Vol 3, ISSN 2304-8824
- Douglas J. Merrey and Lindiwe Sibanda. 2014. Options for Policy Reforms to Enhance the Development Impact of Public and Private Investments in Smallholder Agricultural Water Management. FANRPAN
- Zinyengere N., Crespo O., Hachigonta S. Sibanda L. (2013). Climate Change Adaptation in Southern Africa: Linking science studies and policy decisions to drive evidence-based action. FANRPAN Policy Brief Issue 1 Volume XIII February 2013.
- Hachigonta, S; Nelson, G.C; Thomas, T.S; Sibanda, L.M (2013) Southern African Agriculture and Climate Change, A comprehensive analysis. Published by International Food Policy Research Institute. ISBN 978-0-89629-208-6
- Hachigonta, Sepo; Nelson, Gerald C.; Thomas, Timothy S. and Sibanda, Lindiwe M. 2013. Overview. In Southern African Agriculture and Climate Change: A comprehensive analysis. Chapter 1 pp. 1–23. Washington, D.C.: International Food Policy Research Institute (IFPRI). http://ebrary.ifpri.org/cdm/ref/collection/p15738coll2/id/127787
- Mugabe, Francis T.; Thomas, Timothy S.; Hachigonta, Sepo and Sibanda, Lindiwe M. 2013. Zimbabwe. In Southern African Agriculture and Climate Change: A comprehensive analysis. Chapter 10 pp. 289–323. Washington, D.C.: International Food Policy Research Institute (IFPRI) http://ebrary.ifpri.org/cdm/ref/collection/p15738coll2/id/127792
- Manyatsi, Absalom M.; Thomas, Timothy S.; Masarirambi, Michael T.; Hachigonta, Sepo and Sibanda, Lindiwe M. 2013. Swaziland. In Southern African Agriculture and Climate Change: A comprehensive analysis. Chapter 8 pp. 213–253. Washington, D.C.: International Food Policy Research Institute (IFPRI) http://ebrary.ifpri.org/cdm/ref/collection/p15738coll2/id/127793
- Johnston, Peter; Thomas, Timothy S.; Hachigonta, Sepo and Sibanda, Lindiwe M. 2013. South Africa. In Southern African Agriculture and Climate Change: A comprehensive analysis. Chapter 7 pp. 175–212. Washington, D.C.: International Food Policy Research Institute (IFPRI). http://ebrary.ifpri.org/cdm/ref/collection/p15738coll2/id/127786
- Maure, Genito A.; Thomas, Timothy S.; Hachigonta, Sepo and Sibanda, Lindiwe M. 2013. Mozambique. In Southern African Agriculture and Climate Change: A comprehensive analysis. Chapter 6 pp. 147–173. Washington, D.C.: International Food Policy Research Institute (IFPRI). http://ebrary.ifpri.org/cdm/ref/collection/p15738coll2/id/127789
- Kanyanga, Joseph; Thomas, Timothy S.; Hachigonta, Sepo and Sibanda, Lindiwe M. 2013. Zambia. In Southern African Agriculture and Climate Change: A comprehensive analysis. Chapter 9 pp. 255–287. Washington, D.C.: International Food Policy Research Institute (IFPRI). http://ebrary.ifpri.org/cdm/ref/collection/p15738coll2/id/127790
- Saka, John D.K.; Sibale, Pickford; Thomas, Timothy S.; Hachigonta, Sepo and Sibanda, Lindiwe M. 2013. Malawi. In Southern African Agriculture and Climate Change: A comprehensive analysis. Chapter 5 pp. 111–146. Washington, D.C.: International Food Policy Research Institute (IFPRI) http://ebrary.ifpri.org/cdm/ref/collection/p15738coll2/id/127791
- Gwimbi, Patrick; Thomas, Timothy S.; Hachigonta, Sepo and Sibanda, Lindiwe M. 2013. Lesotho. In Southern African Agriculture and Climate Change: A comprehensive analysis. Chapter 4 pp. 71–109. Washington, D.C.: International Food Policy Research Institute (IFPRI). http://ebrary.ifpri.org/cdm/ref/collection/p15738coll2/id/127788
- Zhou, Peter P.; Simbini, Tichakunda; Ramokgotlwane, Gorata; Thomas, Timothy S.; Hachigonta, Sepo and Sibanda, Lindiwe M. 2013. Botswana. In Southern African Agriculture and Climate Change: A comprehensive analysis. Chapter 3 pp. 41–70. Washington, D.C.: International Food Policy Research Institute (IFPRI). http://ebrary.ifpri.org/cdm/ref/collection/p15738coll2/id/127785
- Editor in Chief for FANRPAN's AgriDeal Magazine (2013). The River between. Vol 2, ISSN 2304-8824
- Zinyengere, N Crespo, O, Hachigonta, S and Sibanda, L.M (2013). Climate Change Adaptation in Southern Africa: Linking science studies and policy decisions to drive evidence-based action. FANRPAN Policy Brief, Issue no. 1: Volume XIII
- Sullivan A, Mumba A, Hachigonta, S Connolly, M and Sibanda L.M (2013). Appropriate Climate Smart Technologies for Smallholder Farmers in Sub-Saharan Africa. FANRPAN Policy Brief, Issue no. 2: Volume XIIIEditor in chief for FANRPAN's Agri Deal Magazine (2012). Women Warming Africa Vol 1, ISSN 2304-8824
- Sullivan, A, Mwamakamba, S, Mumba A, Hachigonta S and Sibanda L.M (2012). Climate Smart Agriculture: More Than Technologies Are Needed to Move Smallholder Farmers toward Resilient and Sustainable Livelihoods. FANRPAN Policy Brief Issue no. 2: Volume XIII
- Sullivan, A. and SIBANDA, L.M (2010). Vulnerable Populations, Unreliable Water and Low Water Productivity: A Role for Institutions in the Limpopo Basin. Published in: Water International, Vol. 35, Issue 5 September 2010, pages 545 - 572
- SIBANDA, L.M and Ndema, S. (2008). The Global Food Crisis: Who are the Architects of our Livelihoods? FANRPAN Policy Brief Series 01/8 August 2008.
- SIBANDA, L.M (2008). African Think Tanks and Policy Dialogues: Time to Start Talking Again. In: Global Future: The global food price crisis: ensuring food security for all. No. 3, 2008. A World Vision Journal of Human Development.
- SIBANDA, L.M (2007). Food Agriculture and Policy Analysis Network (FANRPAN) and its Evolving Partnership with the CGIAR. Alignment and Collective Action Updates. A quarterly newsletter on the CGIAR's institutional and partnership innovations for greater impact in eastern and southern Africa. August 2007, Vol. 1:3 pg 2
- SIBANDA, L.M, Kalibwani, F and Kureya, T. (2006). Silent Hunger: Policy Options for Effective Response to the Impact of HIV and AIDS on Agriculture and Food Security in the SADC Region. FANRPAN, 2006.
- MERREY D.J and SIBANDA, L.M (2006). From Rain fed Poverty to Irrigated Prosperity: Expanding Micro-Agricultural Water Management in Sub-Saharan Africa.
- SIBANDA, L. M., BRYANT, M. J. and NDLOVU, L. R. (2000). Live weight and Body Condition Score Changes of Female Matebele Goats During their Breeding Cycle in a Semi- Arid Environment under Traditional Management. Small Ruminant Research, 35: 271 – 275.
- SIBANDA, L. M., NDLOVU, L. R. and BRYANT, M. J. (1999). Effects of a Low Plane of Nutrition during Pregnancy and Lactation on the Performance of MatebeleDoes and their kids. Small Ruminant Research, 32: 234–250.
- SIBANDA, L.M., SIMELA, L. (1997). Carcass characteristics of the marketed Matebele goat from south-western Zimbabwe. DOI: 10.1016/S0921-4488(98)00182-5
- SIBANDA, L.M., BRYANT, M.J., NDLOVU, L.R. (1997). Factors Affecting the Growth and Survival of Goat Kids in a Semi-Arid Environment under Smallholder Management. Journal of Applied Science in Southern Africa, 3: 27–33.
- SIBANDA, L.M., NDLOVU, L.R., BRYANT, M. J. (1997). Reproductive Performance of Matebele Goats in a Semi-Arid Environment under Smallholder Management. Journal of Applied Science in Southern Africa, 3: 35–42.
- SIBANDA, L.M., NDLOVU, L.R. and BRYANT, M.J. (1997). Effects of Feeding Varying Amounts of a Grain-Forage Diet during Late Pregnancy and Lactation on the Performance of Matebele Goats. Journal of Agricultural Science (Cambridge), 128: 469–477.
- SIBANDA, L.M., SIMELA, L. (1997). Milk production, processing and marketing to improve the nutrition and income generating capacity of rural households in Zimbabwe
- NDLOVU, L.R. and SIBANDA, L.M. (1996). The Potential of Dolichos Lablab and Acacia tortilis Pods in Smallholder Feeding Systems for Goat Kids in Semi-Arid Areas of Southern Africa. Small Ruminant Research, 21:273-276.
- SIBANDA, L.M, NDLOVU L. R., BRYANT M. J. (1997). Factors Affecting the Growth and Survival of MatebeleGoat Kids in a Semi-Arid Environment under Smallholder Management. In: Journal of Applied Science in Southern Africa, Vol. 3, Nos. 1 & 2.
- NDLOVU, L. R., SIBANDA, H.M., SIBANDA, L.M. and HOVE, E. (1995). Nutritive Value of Indigenous BrowsableTree Species in a Semi-Arid Area of Zimbabwe. IVthInternationalSymposium on the Nutrition of Herbivores. Clermont-Ferrand, France, 11–15 September 1995.
- SIBANDA, L.M., BRYANT, M.J. and NDLOVU, L.R. (1993). Litter Size in the Matebele Goat and its Effect on Productivity. Animal Production, 56:440.
- NDLOVU, L.R. and SIBANDA, L.M. (1993). Management Strategies for Minimizing Environmental Constraints to Small ruminant Production in Semi-Arid Areas of Southern Africa. In: Animal Production in Developing Countries. (Gill, M., Owen, E., Pollott, G.E. and Lawrence, T.L.J., Editors). British Society of Animal Production, Occasional Publication No. 16 pp 178.
- SIBANDA, L.M., BRYANT, M.J. and NDLOVU, L.R. (1993). The Effect of Kidding Season on Productivity of Indigenous Matebele Goats of Zimbabwe. In: Animal Production in Developing Countries. (Gill, M., Owen, E., Pollott, G.E. and Lawrence, T.L.J. Editors). British Society of Animal Production Occasional Publication No. 16 pp 184–185.
- NDLOVU, L. R. and SIBANDA, L.M. (1993). Improving the Productivity of Indigenous Goats in Zimbabwe. In: Improving Productivity of Indigenous Livestock using Radioimmunoassay (RIA) and other Techniques. International Atomic Energy Agency, Vienna, Austria. pp 177–189.
- NDLOVU, L. R. and SIBANDA, L.M. (1993). Management Strategies for Minimizing Environmental Constraints to Small Ruminant Production in Semi-Arid Areas of Southern Africa. In: Animal Production in Developing Countries. Occasional Publication No. 16. (M. Gill, E. Owen, G.E. Pollot and T.L.J. Lawrence eds.) British Society of Animal Production. pp 178.
- SIBANDA, L.M., BRYANT, M.J. and NDLOVU, L.R. (1992). Responses of Matebele Goats of Zimbabwe to Feeding Level: Lactation. Animal Production 54 (3) 472.
- SIBANDA, L.M., NDLOVU, L. R. and BRYANT, M.J. (1992). Experiences in Adapting Previously Free-Ranging Traditionally Managed Matebele Goats of Zimbabwe to Individual Stall Feeding. In: Small Ruminant Research and Development in Africa (Rey, B., Lebbie, S.H. and Reynolds, L. eds) pp 345–354. ILCA, Addis Ababa, Ethiopia.
- NDLOVU, L. R. and SIBANDA, L.M. (1991). Management Strategies for Minimizing Environmental Constraints to Small Ruminant Production in Semi-Arid Areas of Southern Africa. British Society of Animal Production Occasional Meeting, Kent, 2–4 September 1991.
- SIBANDA, L.M. and NDLOVU, L. R. (1991). Productivity of Indigenous Matebele Goats of Zimbabwe under Traditional Management. British Society of Animal Production Occasional Meeting, Kent, 2–4 September 1991.
- NDLOVU, L. R. and SIBANDA, L.M. (1991). Improving the Nutritional Status of Smallholder Livestock in Agro-Silvicultural Systems in Semi-Arid Southern Africa. In: Isotopes and Related Techniques in Animal Production and Health. International Atomic Agency, Vienna, pp 201–209.
- SIBANDA, L.M., NDLOVU, L. R. and BRYANT, M.J. (1992). Veld Hay and Lucerne as Feed for Indigenous Matebele Does Kidding During the Dry Season. In: Complementarity of feed resources in African livestock production. (Stares, J.E.S., Said, A.N. and Kategile, J.A. eds). ILCA, Addis Ababa, Ethiopia, pp 205–214
