= Safaa Kumari =

Syrian born plant virologist

- Born: 1963 (age 62–63); Aleppo, Syria
- Education: University of Aleppo
- Occupations: Head of Seed Health Laboratory/Plant Virologist, International Center for Agricultural Research in the Dry Areas (ICARDA)
- Known for: Virology, virus diagnosis, host resistance, phytosanitation
- Parent: Mohamad Ghassan

Safaa Kumari (Arabic: صفاء قمري; born 1963) is a Syrian born plant virologist. She is known for developing a disease resistant variety of faba bean that is resistant to the faba bean necrotic yellows virus (FBNYV).

== Life ==
She was born in 1963 in Aleppo. She was brought up in Aleppo and she has several siblings. Between 1982 and 1985 she was at Aleppo University where she studied in the faculty of Agriculture.

She began work looking at a virus that has been spreading from Ethiopia and it affects the important food plants of lentils, faba beans and chickpeas. This is devastating for low income families who rely on these beans to be their "poor man's meat". Oddly the cause is linked to climate change. The changing temperatures encourages the aphid population to boom and these aphids spread the virus much more widely. She discovered a faba bean variety that was resistant to faba necrotic yellow virus (FBNYV).

She was living in Aleppo during the war in Syria. She had left to attend a conference in Addis Abbaba when she was told that her family were on the run. Her family had been given ten minutes to leave their home. She decided to risk her life by travelling to Damascus and then driving to rescue the disease resistant seeds. The seeds had been stored at her sisters residence and it was in the centre of Aleppo. She collected the seeds and then travelled to Lebanon. Her next task was to take the resistance traits that she had found and transfer them to a productive variety.

She immediately set to work in her new home, and also dove into the yellow rust and stem rust situation in Lebanon. During this time she put together definitive evidence that Ug99 had not yet reached the country.

In 2020, she was recognised in the BBC's 100 Women. Two women from Syria made the list - the other was the film maker Waad Al Kateab. By this time she was working in Lebanon. Where she worked at the International Center for Agricultural Research in the Dry Areas (ICARDA) in the Beqa’a Valley. In the same month as her award, researchers announced that the FBNYV virus had been observed in Spain.
