= Lindani =

Lindani (Lindiwe female) is a masculine given name derived from the Nguni word linda, meaning "wait".

- Lindani Ndwandwe (born 1975), South African golfer
- Lindani Nkosi (born 1968), South African actor
