= Ringyuichon Vashum =

Indian activist micro credit in Ukhrul District

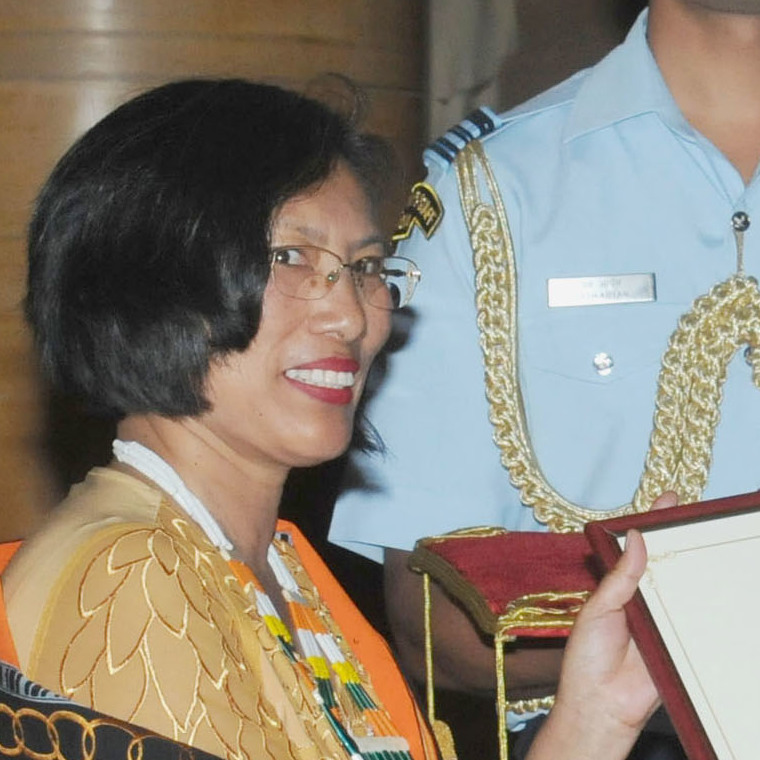
- Receiving Nari Shakti Puraskar on International Women’s Day 2017.
- Occupation: social activist
- Employer: Ukhrul District Women Institute of Micro-Credit (UDWIM)
- Known for: championing microcredit in Manipur
- Awards: Nari Shakti Puraskar (2017)

Ringyuichon Vashum is an Indian activist for microcredit in Ukhrul District in the state of Manipur. She facilitates the formation of women's self-help groups. She was awarded the Nari Shakti Puraskar for her work in 2017.

== Life ==
Ringyuichon Vashum is President of the Participatory Action for Sustainable Development Organization based in the state of Manipur. The organisation was formed in 1997 and seeks to support people's participatory action. In 2007, she began working to improve the lot of the women of the hills in the Ukhrul District in the north of Manipur, an area home to the Tangkhul Nagas.

Vashum became the director of the Ukhrul District Women Institute of Micro-Credit (UDWIM) as part of the North Eastern Region Community Resource Management Project. Her organisation provides microcredit to women in self help groups formed under UDWIM in the Ukhrul district. Vashum used the assistance to encourage the women to move away from growing marijuana and opium poppies, and into organic farming and the keeping of poultry. Other business opportunities have included embroidery, food processing and hand loom weaving.

Vashum was invited to the Presidential Palace (Rashtrapati Bhavan) in New Delhi on International Women's Day in 2017 to be awarded the Nari Shakti Puraskar. She was one of 27 women who were recognised and five organisations were also honoured. Her citation credits her with working to "empower over 13,000 women SHGs [self help groups]". At the awards, she encouraged another winner Reema Sathe to visit Manipur and its isolated villages. Sathe was impressed to see how the concept of sustainability was taking root in the region.
