= CGIAR =

Food security research organisation

- Formation: 1971; 55 years ago
- Type: Partnership of funders and international agricultural research centers; Intergovernmental Organization
- Location: Global
- Key people: Juergen Voegele, Chair CGIAR System Council; Lindiwe Majele Sibanda, Chair CGIAR System Board
- Website: cgiar.org
- Formerly called: Consultative Group on International Agricultural Research

CGIAR (formerly the Consultative Group for International Agricultural Research) is a global partnership that unites international organizations engaged in research about food security. CGIAR research aims to reduce rural poverty, increase food security, improve human health and nutrition, and sustainable management of natural resources.

CGIAR research is carried out at 15 centers that collaborate with partners from national and regional research institutes, civil society organizations, academia, development organizations, and the private sector. These research centers are around the globe, with most in the Global South and Vavilov centers of agricultural crop genetic diversity. CGIAR has an annual research portfolio of just over US$900 million with more than 9,000 staff working in 89 countries.

Funding is provided by national governments, multilateral funding and development agencies and leading private foundations. Representatives of CGIAR Funders and developing countries meet as the CGIAR System Council to keep under review the strategy, mission, impact and continued relevancy of the CGIAR System in a rapidly changing landscape of agricultural research for development.

== Goals ==
CGIAR works to help meet the global targets laid out in the Sustainable Development Goals with an emphasis on five areas of impact:

- Nutrition, Health, and Food Security
- Poverty Reduction, Livelihoods, and Jobs
- Gender Equality, Youth, and Social Inclusion
- Climate Adaptation and Mitigation
- Environmental Health and Biodiversity

== Vision and mission ==
CGIAR's vision is: A world with sustainable and resilient food, land, and water systems that deliver diverse, healthy, safe, sufficient, and affordable diets, and ensure improved livelihoods and greater social equality, within planetary and regional environmental boundaries.

CGIAR's mission is to deliver science and innovation that advance transformation of food, land, and water systems in a climate crisis.

== "One CGIAR" reform ==
The concept of a unified and integrated "One CGIAR" was approved by the CGIAR System Council (November 2019) to adapt to rapidly changing global conditions, while also making the CGIAR system more relevant and effective. The fragmented nature of CGIAR's governance and institutions had limited the System's ability to both respond to increasingly interconnected challenges and to consistently deliver best practice and effectively scaled, research solutions needed to maximise impact. One CGIAR includes a unified governance and management through a reconstituted System Management Board and a new Executive Management Team.

== Research Portfolio ==
CGIAR's Research Portfolio consists of Initiatives are major, prioritized areas of investment that bring capacity from within and beyond CGIAR to bear on well-defined, major challenges. Thirty-two Initiatives meet a common set of requirements, articulated in System Council documentation and evaluable through the Independent Science for Development Council quality of research for development criteria.

The Research Portfolio is organized by the three Action Areas detailed in the CGIAR 2030 Research and Innovation Strategy: Systems Transformation, Resilient Agrifood Systems, and Genetic Innovation. Each Initiative is placed under a primary Action Area, yet most Initiatives involve collaboration across more than one Action Area.

== History ==
=== Early years (1971–1990) ===
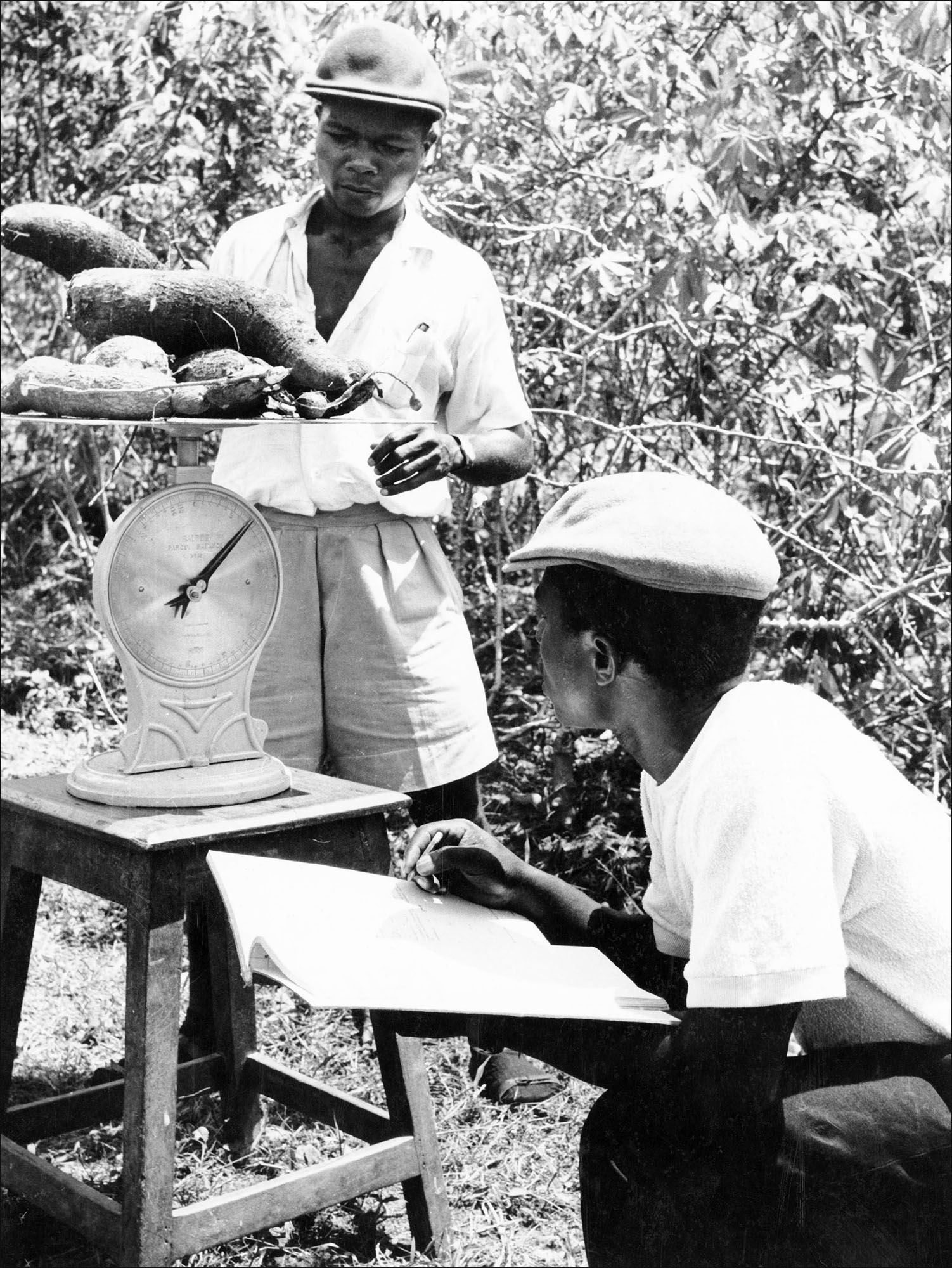
IITA agricultural officers weigh cassava in 1970.

CGIAR arose in response to the widespread concern in the mid-20th century that rapid increases in human populations would soon lead to widespread famine. Starting in 1943, the Rockefeller Foundation and the Mexican government laid the seeds for the Green Revolution when they established the Office of Special Studies, which resulted in the establishment of the International Rice Research Institute (IRRI) in 1960 and International Maize and Wheat Improvement Center (CIMMYT) in 1963 with support from the Rockefeller Foundation and Ford Foundation. These centers work toward developing high-yielding, disease-resistant varieties that dramatically increased production of these staple cereals, and turned India, for example, from a country regularly facing starvation in the 1960s to a net exporter of cereals by the late-1970s.

But it was clear that the Rockefeller and Ford Foundations alone could not fund all the agricultural research and development efforts needed to feed the world's population.

In 1969, the Pearson Commission on International Development urged the international community to undertake "intensive international effort" to support "research specializing in food supplies and tropical agriculture".

In 1970, the Rockefeller Foundation proposed a worldwide network of agricultural research centers under a permanent secretariat. This was further supported and developed by the World Bank, FAO and UNDP. The Consultative Group on International Agricultural Research (CGIAR) was established on 19 May 1971, to coordinate international agricultural research efforts aimed at reducing poverty and achieving food security in developing countries.

Australian economist Sir John Crawford was appointed as the inaugural chair of the Technical Advisory Committee.

CGIAR originally supported four centers: CIMMYT, IRRI, the International Center for Tropical Agriculture (CIAT) and the International Institute of Tropical Agriculture (IITA). The initial focus on the staple cereals—rice, wheat and maize—widened during the 1970s to include cassava, chickpea, sorghum, potato, millets and other food crops, and encompassed livestock, farming systems, the conservation of genetic resources, plant nutrition, water management, policy research, and services to national agricultural research centers in developing countries.

By 1983, there were 13 research centers around the world under its umbrella.

=== Expansion and consolidation (1991–2000) ===
By the 1990s the number of centers supported by CGIAR had grown to 18. Mergers between the two livestock centers the International Laboratory for Research on Animal Diseases (ILRAD) and the International Livestock Centre for Africa (ILCA)) and the absorption of work on bananas and plantains into the program of the International Plant Genetic Resources Institute (IPGRI; now Bioversity International) reduced the number to 16. Later another center (ISNAR) was absorbed, reducing the total number of supported centers to 15.

The reduction in the number of supported centers was not enough to address problems facing the group. These included the logistics of funders and the group alike in dealing with a large number of centers. This led to the creation of three classes of centers, divided into high, medium, and low impact delivery.

At the same time, a number of aid recipient countries like China, India, and Malaysia created their own development agencies and developed cadres of agricultural scientists. Private donors and industries also contributed, while research institutions in the rich world turned their attention to problems of the poor. CGIAR, however, failed to embrace these changes in any effective way.

=== CGIAR reforms (2001–2007) ===
Seeking to increase its efficiency and build on its previous successes, CGIAR embarked on a program of reform in 2001. Key among the changes implemented was the adoption of Challenge Programs as a means of harnessing the strengths of the diverse centers to address major global or regional issues. Three Challenge Programs were established within the supported research centers and a fourth to FARA, a research forum in Africa:

- Water and Food, aimed at producing more food using less water; (Including Basin Focal Projects)
- HarvestPlus, to improve the micronutrient content of staple foods; and
- Generation, aimed at increasing the use of crop genetic resources to create a new generation of plants that meet farmers and consumers needs.

=== A new CGIAR (2008–2021) ===
In 2008, CGIAR embarked on a change process to improve the engagement between all stakeholders in international agricultural research for development—donors, researchers and beneficiaries—and to refocus the efforts of the centers on major global development challenges. A key objective was to integrate the work of the centers and their partners, avoiding fragmentation and duplication of effort.

CGIAR components during this time included the CGIAR Consortium of International Agricultural Research Centers, the CGIAR Fund, the CGIAR Independent Science and Partnership Council (ISPC) and partners. Research was guided by the CGIAR Strategy and Results Framework. The CGIAR Consortium united the centers supported by CGIAR; it coordinated limited research activities of about 15 research projects (see list below) among the centers and provided donors with a single contact point to centers. The CGIAR Fund aimed to harmonize the efforts of donors to contribute to agricultural research for development, increased the funding available by reducing or eliminating duplication of effort among the centers and promoted greater financial stability. The CGIAR ISPC, appointed by the CGIAR Fund Council, provided advice to the funders of CGIAR, particularly in ensuring that CGIAR's research programs are aligned with the Strategy and Results Framework. It provided a bridge between the funders and the CGIAR Consortium. The hope was that the Strategy and Results Framework would provide the strategic direction for the centers and CGIAR Research Programs, ensuring that they focus on delivering measurable results that contribute to achieving CGIAR objectives. However the research programs were designed prior to the Framework being ready, so now some refitting had to take place to get the programs inline with it.

==== CGIAR Consortium of International Agricultural Research Centers ====
The CGIAR Consortium of International Agricultural Research Centers was established in April 2010 to coordinate and support the work of the 15 international agricultural research centers supported by CGIAR. It played a central role in formulating the CGIAR Strategy and Results Framework (SRF) that guided the work of CGIAR-supported centers on CGIAR funded research and developing CGIAR Research Programs under the SRF. The work of the CGIAR Consortium was governed by the Consortium Board, a 10-member panel that had fiduciary responsibility for CGIAR Research Programs, including monitoring and evaluation and reporting progress to donors. CGIAR Research Programs were approved and funded by the CGIAR Fund on a contractual basis through performance agreements.

==== Agri-Food Systems CGIAR Research Programs ====
Agri-Food Systems CGIAR Research Programs were multi-center, multi-partner initiatives built on three core principles: impact on CGIAR's four system-level objectives; making the most of the centers' strengths; and strong and effective partnerships.

The following research programs comprised the CGIAR Research Portfolio of 2017-2021 (lead centers shown in brackets):

- FISH - Fish Agri-Food Systems (WorldFish)
- FTA - Forests, Trees, and Agroforestry (CIFOR)
- Grain Legumes and Dryland Cereals (ICRISAT)
- WHEAT - Global Alliance for Improving Food Security and the Livelihoods of the Resource-poor in the Developing World (CIMMYT)
- Livestock (ILRI)
- Maize (CIMMYT)
- Rice (IRRI)
- RTB - Roots, Tubers and Bananas (CIP)

Global Integrating Programs

Cross-cutting Global Integrating Programs framed to work closely with the Agri-Food Systems Programs within relevant agro-ecological systems. Four programs formed part of the 2017-2021 Portfolio.

- CCAFS - Climate Change, Agriculture and Food Security (CIAT)
- A4NH - Agriculture for Nutrition and Health (IFPRI)
- PIM - Policies, Institutions, & Markets (IFPRI)
- WLE - Water, Land and Ecosystems (IWMI)

Former programs

- GRiSP - A Global Rice Science Partnership (IRRI)
- Aquatic Agricultural Systems - Harnessing the Development Potential of Aquatic Agricultural Systems for the Poor and Vulnerable (WorldFish)
- More Meat, Milk and Fish by and for the poor (ILRI)
- Dryland Systems
- Humidtropics
- Grain Legumes (ICRISAT)

A new strategy and results framework was approved in 2015 and the portfolio of research programs revised. The systems programs dryland systems, aquatic agricultural systems, and Humidtropics ceased to be standalone programs, even though they were seen as what was new to the reformed CGIAR, but were not given a real chance to take off and prosper, mainly due to funding reductions, but also because of a refocus on commodity value chains. These commodity programs were renamed to, for example, RTB Systems Program or Rice Systems Program. Some work of the earlier systems programs were incorporated, but most was lost.

==== Research platforms ====
CGIAR supported four research platforms from 2017 to 2021:

- CGIAR Excellence in Breeding Platform
- CGIAR Genebank Platform
- CGIAR Platform for Big Data in Agriculture
- CGIAR GENDER (Gender Equality in Food Systems Research) Platform

== Impacts ==
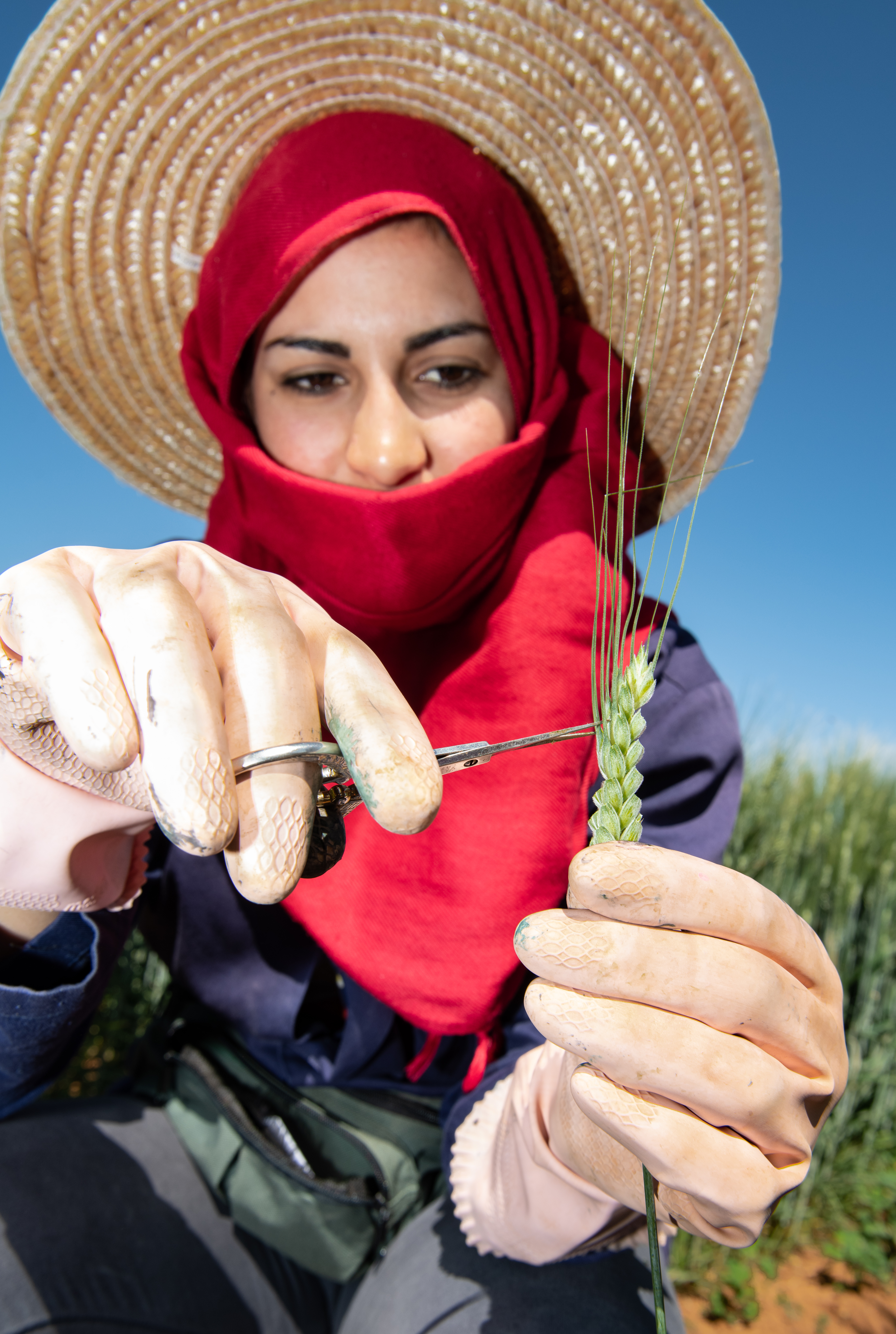
Much of the impact of CGIAR research comes from crop genetic improvement. A field technician at ICARDA's research station in Terbol, Lebanon emasculates a durum wheat spike to prepare for pollination.

The impacts of CGIAR research have been extensively assessed. Investments in CGIAR research generate returns of 10 times the amount invested.

Much of the impact of the CGIAR centers has come from crop genetic improvement. This includes the high-yielding wheat and rice varieties that were the foundation of the Green Revolution. An assessment of the impact of crop breeding efforts at CGIAR centers between 1965 and 1998 showed CGIAR involvement in 65 percent of the area planted to 10 crops addressed by CGIAR, specifically wheat, rice, maize, sorghum, millet, barley, lentils, beans, cassava, and potatoes. Of this, 60 percent was sown with varieties with CGIAR ancestry (more than 90 percent in the case of lentils, beans, and cassava), and half of those varieties came from crosses made at a CGIAR center. The monetary value of CGIAR's investment in crop improvement is considerable, running into the billions of dollars.

The centers have also contributed to such fields as improving the nutritional value of staple crops; pest and disease control through breeding resistant varieties; integrated pest management and biological control (e.g., control of the cassava mealybug in sub-Saharan Africa through release of a predatory wasp); improvements in livestock and fish production systems; genetic resources characterization and conservation; improved natural resource management; and contributions to improved policies in numerous areas, including forestry, fertilizer, milk marketing, and genetic resources conservation and use.

Further impacts of CGIAR include:

- Increased resilience, income and yield for 4.75 million farmers in India working across 3.7 million hectares by scaling CGIAR-developed natural resource management practices.
- Improved nutrition for 20 million people in low-income countries through increased access to critical nutrients via micronutrient-fortified crops with higher content of vitamin A, iron, and zinc.
- Increased rice yield by 0.6 to 1.8 ton per hectare and profitability by up to US$200 per hectare through use of a smart mobile crop management tool called "RiceAdvice" used in 13 countries in sub-Saharan Africa.
- For an annual investment of roughly US$30 million, the benefits gained from wheat research are in the range of US$2.2 billion to US$3.1 billion each year, from 1994 to 2014. For every $1 invested in wheat breeding, $73 to $103 were returned in direct benefits. Almost half the world's wheat land is sown to varieties that come from research by CGIAR scientists and their global network of partners.
- The introduction of no-tillage systems in the rice-wheat systems in the Indo-Gangetic Plains, for example, generated economic benefits of about US$165 million between 1990 and 2010 from an investment of only US$3.5 million.
- A 2010 study projected that increased adoption of CGIAR-developed drought-tolerant maize varieties could increase harvests in 13 African countries by 10-34 percent, which could generate up to US$1.5 billion in benefits for producers and consumers.
- CGIAR has spent 20 percent of its expenditure on strengthening the capacity of national partners through formal and informal training and have trained over 80,000 professionals around the world.

== Research centers ==
Active centers and their headquarters locations

Active CGIAR Centers	Headquarters location
Africa Rice Center (West Africa Rice Development Association, WARDA)	Abidjan, Ivory Coast
The Alliance of Bioversity International and the International Center for Tropical Agriculture (CIAT)	Maccarese, Italy; Palmira, Colombia
Center for International Forestry Research (CIFOR)	Bogor, Indonesia
International Center for Agricultural Research in the Dry Areas (ICARDA)	Beirut, Lebanon
International Crops Research Institute for the Semi-Arid Tropics (ICRISAT)	Hyderabad (Patancheru), India
International Food Policy Research Institute (IFPRI)	Washington, D.C., United States
International Institute of Tropical Agriculture (IITA)	Ibadan, Nigeria
International Livestock Research Institute (ILRI)	Nairobi, Kenya
International Maize and Wheat Improvement Center (CIMMYT)	Texcoco de Mora, Mexico
International Potato Center (CIP)	Lima, Peru
International Rice Research Institute (IRRI)	Los Baños, Philippines
International Water Management Institute (IWMI)	Battaramulla, Sri Lanka
World Agroforestry (International Centre for Research in Agroforestry, ICRAF)	Nairobi, Kenya
WorldFish (formerly International Center for Living Aquatic Resources Management, ICLARM)	Penang, Malaysia

Centers no longer active

Inactive CGIAR Centers	Headquarters	Change
International Laboratory for Research on Animal Diseases (ILRAD)	Nairobi, Kenya	1994: merged with ILCA to become ILRI
International Livestock Centre for Africa (ILCA)	Addis Ababa, Ethiopia	1994: merged with ILRAD to become ILRI
International Network for the Improvement of Banana and Plantain (INIBAP)	Montpellier, France	1994: became a programme of Bioversity International
International Service for National Agricultural Research (ISNAR)	The Hague, Netherlands	2004: dissolved, main programmes moved to IFPRI
