= Pearson Commission on International Development =

The Pearson Commission on International Development investigated the effectiveness of the World Bank's development assistance in the 20 years to 1968 and made recommendations for future operation of the organization.

In August 1968, Robert S. McNamara, then President of the World Bank, formed the commission, asking former Canadian Prime Minister and Nobel Peace Prize winner Lester B. Pearson to head the commission. On September 15, 1969, Pearson and seven colleagues on the Commission on International Development delivered their report, Partners in Development.
