= Wafaie Fawzi =

Sudanese-American epidemiomologist

Wafaei Fawzi is a Sudanese-American epidemiomologist currently the Richard Saltonstall Professor of Population Sciences at Harvard T.H. Chan School of Public Health. He is also Professor of Nutrition, Epidemiology, and Global Health and the Chair of the Department of Global Health and Population.

== Education ==
- MBBS, 1986, Faculty of Medicine, University of Khartoum
- MPH (Public Health), 1989, Harvard School of Public Health
- MS (Maternal and Child Health), 1991, Harvard School of Public Health
- DrPH (Epidemiology and Nutrition), 1992, Harvard School of Public Health
