= Rainfed agriculture =

Type of farming that uses rain for water

Rainfed agriculture is a type of farming that relies on rainfall for water. It provides much of the food consumed by poor communities in developing countries. E.g., rainfed agriculture accounts for more than 95% of farmed land in sub-Saharan Africa, 90% in Latin America, 75% in the Near East and North Africa, 65% in East Asia, and 60% in South Asia.

There is a strong correlation between poverty, hunger and water scarcity in part because of the dependencies on rainfed agriculture in developing economies. Moreover, because of increased weather variability, climate change is expected to make rain-fed farmers more vulnerable to climate change.

Rainfed agriculture is distinguished in most of the literature from irrigated agriculture, which applies water from other sources, such as freshwater from streams, rivers and lakes or groundwater. As farmers become more aware of and develop better water resource management strategies, most agriculture exists on a spectrum between rainfed and irrigated agriculture.

== Hunger and water correlation ==
There is a correlation between poverty, hunger, and water scarcity. The UN Millennium Development Project has identified the ‘hot spot’ countries in the world suffering from the largest prevalence of malnutrition. These countries coincide closely with those located in the semi-arid and dry sub-humid hydroclimates in the world (i.e., savanna and steppe ecosystems), where rainfed agriculture is the dominant source of food and where water constitutes a key limiting factor to crop growth. Of the 850 million undernourished people in the world, essentially all live in poor, developing countries, which predominantly are located in tropical regions.

Levels of productivity, particularly in parts of sub-Saharan Africa and South Asia, are low due to degraded soils, high levels of evaporation, droughts, floods and a general lack of effective water management. A major study into water use by agriculture, known as the Comprehensive Assessment of Water Management in Agriculture, coordinated by the International Water Management Institute, noted a close correlation between hunger, poverty, and water. However, it concluded that there was much opportunity to raise the productivity of rainfed farming. Managing rainwater and soil moisture more effectively and using supplemental and small-scale irrigation is believed to hold the key to helping the greatest number of poor people. It called for a new era of water investments and policies for upgrading rainfed agriculture that would go beyond controlling field-level soil and water to bring new freshwater sources through better local management of rainfall and runoff.

The importance of rainfed agriculture varies regionally, but it produces most food for poor communities in developing countries. In sub-Saharan Africa, more than 95% of the farmed land is rainfed, while the corresponding figure for Latin America is almost 90%, for South Asia about 60%, for East Asia 65%, and for the Near East and North Africa 75%. Most countries in the world depend primarily on rainfed agriculture for their grain food. Despite large strides made in improving productivity and environmental conditions in many developing countries, a great number of poor families in Africa and Asia still face poverty, hunger, food insecurity, and malnutrition where rainfed agriculture is the main agricultural activity. These problems are exacerbated by adverse biophysical growing conditions and the poor socioeconomic infrastructure in many areas in the semi-arid tropics (SAT). The SAT is the home to 38% of the developing countries’ poor, 75% of whom live in rural areas. Over 45% of the world's hungry and more than 70% of its malnourished children live in the SAT.

== Output trends ==
Since the late 1960s, agricultural land use has expanded by 20–25%, which has contributed to approximately 30% of the overall grain production growth during the period. The remaining yield outputs originated from intensification through yield increases per unit land area. However, the regional variation is large, as is the difference between irrigated and rainfed agriculture. In developing countries, rainfed grain yields are on average 1.5 hectare, compared with 3.1 hectare for irrigated yields, and increase in production from rainfed agriculture has mainly originated from land expansion.

== See also ==
- Water security
