= Alien Mus =

Indonesian politician (born 1987)

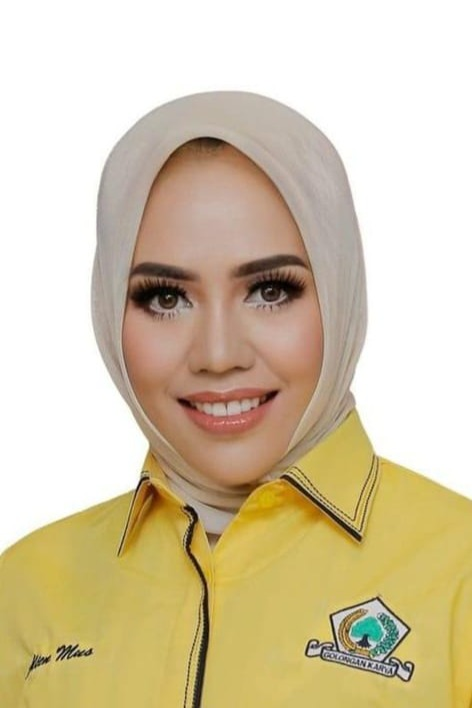
- Alien in 2023

Member of the House of Representatives
- Incumbent
- Assumed office 1 October 2019
- Constituency: North Maluku

Speaker of the North Maluku Regional House of Representatives
- In office 2014–2019
- Preceded by: Saiful Bahri Ruray
- Succeeded by: Kuntu Daud

Personal details
- Born: 8 August 1987 (age 39) Gela, North Taliabu, Taliabu Island, Maluku, Indonesia
- Party: Golkar
- Spouse: Denis Henry Edouward Teste
- Children: 2
- Parents: Muhammad Taher Mus (father); Saadiah Keni (mother)
- Education: Al-Azhar University of Indonesia

Alien Muhammad Taher Mus (born 8 August 1987) is an Indonesian politician who is currently serving as a member of the House of Representatives from Golkar, representing the North Maluku electoral district since 2019. She previously served as the speaker of the North Maluku Regional House of Representatives from 2014 until 2019.

== Early life, family, and education ==
Alien was born in Gela, a village in the Taliabu Island, on 8 August 1987, as the youngest child of five of Muhammad Taher Mus, the Gela village chief, and Saadiah Keni. As village chief, Taher Mus was instrumental in developing the Bobong town, which would later become the capital of the Taliabu Island when it was established as a separate regency in 2013.

All of Alien Mus's brothers and sisters were involved in politics, and the family was known as the Mus political dynasty. Alien Mus's eldest brother, Ahmad Hidayat Mus, served as the chairman of the local parliament and later became the regent of the Sula Islands for eleven years. Zainal Mus followed in his brother's footsteps, serving as the chairman of the Sula Islands parliament from 2005 to 2010, while Aliong Mus has been the regent of the Taliabu Islands since 2016. Fifian Mus, the family's eldest daughter, has been the regent of the Sula Islands since 2021.

Alien spent most of her childhood in Gela, completing her primary and junior high school education there in 1999 and 2001. She then completed her high school at the 2nd Baubau State High School in 2004 before moving to Jakarta to study communication at the Al-Azhar University of Indonesia. During her time in the university, Alien joined the university's student council and became the secretary of the organization. She graduated from the university with a bachelor's degree in 2008.

== Political career ==
=== In North Maluku ===
Before entering politics, Alien worked as a public relations officer at Garuda Indonesia and Hotel Nikko in Jakarta. She decided to run as a candidate for the North Maluku Regional House of Representatives from the Golkar party in the 2014 Indonesian legislative election, representing the Sula Islands Regency. She was elected and became the council's speaker. As the speaker, she also chaired the council's budgeting and deliberative body.

As a member of Golkar, Alien was elected as the chairwomen of the North Maluku Union of Golkar Women in 2014 and the chair of Golkar party in Ternate, the capital of North Maluku. Alien was unanimously elected as the chairman of the North Maluku's Golkar Party in a regional conference on 31 August 2016. There were accusations of nepotism against Alien, as the regional conference was supervised by Ahmad Hidayat Mus, who was the Golkar's East Indonesian region chair in the party's central executive council. The regional conference tasked Alien to win at least 60% of votes for Golkar in the 2019 legislative election and to secure the victory of Golkar candidates, Edy Langkara and Benny Laos, in the Central Halmahera and Morotai Islands local election. Alien was assisted by Farida Djama, a senior legislator from the North Maluku Regional House of Representatives, in forming her organizational structure.

In the 2017 North Maluku gubernatorial election, Alien directed the party's support for Ahmad Hidayat Mus. Alien began campaigning for her older brother despite not submitting her campaign leave permit, which is mandatory under the law. Alien also dismissed Abdulgani Sangaji and Muis Jamin, the Chairman and Secretary of the Golkar Party in Ternate, for their alleged lack of involvement in the campaign for Ahmad Hidayat Mus governor's bid. Despite Ahmad Hidayat Mus eventual loss in the election, Alien lauded the election as the safest election in North Maluku's history and urged all parties to accept the results.

Alien's sudden dismissal of Abdulgani Sangaji and Muis Jamin, along with her decision to hold an extraordinary party conference, sparked dissent from the lower branches of the party. On 24 December 2018, seven out of the ten Golkar's regency branches, along with the secretary of the North Maluku's Golkar Hamid Usman, issued a motion of no confidence and requested the party's central executive council to dismiss Alien. Alien retaliated by dismissing Hamid Usman from his position under the pretext of disruption. Alien later dismissed three out of the seven chairmen of regency branches for dissenting from the party lines in 2019 and terminated the party membership of several Golkar legislators in 2020.

Alien was re-elected for a second term as the chairman of Golkar in North Maluku, defeating party deputy secretary general Edi Langkara. However, the regional conference that elected Alien to a second term, which was held at the Grand Dafam Bella Hotel, lacked in attendance. Most of Golkar party members, including Hamid Usman, attended the regional conference organized by Edi Langkara at the Boulevard Hotel. The parallel conference elected Syukur Mandar to lead the party in North Maluku. Syukur Mandar described the Boulevard Hotel conference as a conference of "thoughts, development, and unity", while the Grand Dafam Bella Hotel conference as a conference of "cadres who wanted to destroy and divide Golkar". Eventually, Alien was recognized as the sole leader of Golkar in North Maluku after she received an approval letter by Airlangga Hartarto, the party's general chairman.

=== In the House of Representatives ===
After serving in the North Maluku Regional House of Representatives, Alien ran as a candidate for the House of Representatives from the North Maluku electoral district in the 2019 legislative election. She secured a seat after obtaining 45,036 votes, the second greatest number of votes for a single candidate in the electoral district. She was re-elected in the 2024 legislative election with 70,595 votes.

During her first term, Alien became a member of the House of Representative's legislative body and a member of the honorary body, in which she was involved in investigating a case of sexual harassment conducted by a member from the Democratic Party. From her first to second term, Alien was a member of commission 4 of the House of Representatives, which handles matters relating to agriculture, forestry, and fisheries. She also became the member of the budgeting body in her second term.

== Personal life ==
Alien Mus is married to Denis Henry Edouward Teste, a French citizen. The couple has two children.
