= Multiple-use water supply system =

Multiple Use water Schemes (MUS) are low-cost, equitable water supply systems that provide communities with water for both domestic needs and high-value agricultural production, including rearing livestock. They are designed for use in rural areas, inhabited by smallholder farmers, and generally cover ten to 40 households, although some have served many more households.

The International Water Management Institute and International Development Enterprises collaborated on a project using MUS to help reduce poverty in India and Nepal. Between 2003 and 2008, 12 MUS systems were installed in Himalayan hilly areas serving a total of about 5000 households. A water poverty mapping technique helped identify the best areas to target. When the impact of the installed systems was evaluated, it showed that low initial investment costs (approximately US$200 per household) could be paid back within a year. This was because the households served with MUS were able to earn additional income of about US$190 per year through sale of surplus produce.

In a water supply system designed for a single use, such as irrigating crops, livestock might damage hardware if they try to access the water, and people needing water for domestic uses might find there is no water provided in months when it is not needed for watering crops. These problems can be overcome when designing water supply systems for multiple uses. For example, steps can be built to provide access for bathing or washing clothes, and access points can be provided to give livestock safe access to water. Sufficient water can be supplied that there is always some available for domestic uses, even at times when the crops do not need water. Other livelihood options can also be considered; for example, using water for fisheries, as well as rearing livestock, growing crops and domestic uses. MUS can benefit women; for example, by reducing the time they have to spend gathering water and by providing water close to their home with which they can grow produce to feed their families and sell on.

Gutu and Prowse (2017) offer some estimates from Ethiopia on farmers’ willingness to pay for a multiple-use water supply system. They find that willingness to pay is based on gender, the prevalence of waterborne disease, the time to collect water, contact with extension services, access to credit, level of income and location. Respondents would pay 3.43 per cent of average income to participate. Consideration of how gendered norms influence women's access to extension, credit and local markets could extend the benefits of such schemes.
