= International Institute of Tropical Agriculture =

Research institute based in Ibadan, Nigeria

- Abbreviation: IITA
- Formation: 1967
- Type: Intergovernmental Organization
- Purpose: Agricultural research and development
- Headquarters: Ibadan, Oyo State, Nigeria
- Region served: Africa
- Services: Providing better living for the rural farmers
- Members: CGIAR
- Official language: ALL
- Director General: Simeon Ehui
- Main organ: Board of Trustees
- Affiliations: CGIAR
- Website: iita.org

The International Institute of Tropical Agriculture (IITA) is a nonprofit organization that works with partners to enhance crop quality and productivity, reduce producer and consumer risks, and generate wealth from agriculture, with the ultimate goals of reducing hunger, malnutrition, and poverty. IITA's research-for-development (R4D) focuses on addressing the development needs of tropical countries. The institute was established in 1967 and headquarters located in Ibadan, Nigeria, with several research stations spread across Africa. The organization is governed by a Board of Trustees, supported by several countries and the Consultative Group on International Agricultural Research (CGIAR).

== History ==
IITA was established in 1967 in Ibadan as a result of the Ford and Rockefeller Foundations' desire to establish a center for the improvement of the quality of tropical foods. The institute came into existence with the enactment of decree 32. of 1967. Part of the institute's initial goals was to develop a better productive farming system, the selection and breeding of high-yielding crop varieties that are resistant to diseases and pests, and strengthening agricultural research in the humid and tropic regions. The institute was initially situated on a 1000-hectare land. The institute focused on a cereal improvement program, grain and legumes improvement program, farming systems, and root and tuber improvement program. The grain and legume improvement system consisted of soybean, cowpea and tuber program composed of yam and cassava.

IITA joined CGIAR in 1971. It later added tree products such as plantain and banana.

== Partnership ==
The International Institute of Tropical Agriculture (IITA) is partnered with the federal government of Nigeria and World Bank to improve agriculture in Nigeria.

=== Jigawa ===
The institute partners with the Jigawa government to revolutionize agriculture in Jigawa state.

=== Training ===
In early 2024, the International Institute of Tropical Agriculture (IITA) trained youth in agriculture business to empower and boost productivity in agriculture in Nigeria.

== Stations ==
- Benin
- Cameroon
- DR Congo (Bukavu)
- DR Congo
- Ghana (Accra)
- Ghana (Tamale)
- Kenya
- Malawi
- Mozambique
- Nigeria (Abuja)
- Nigeria (Ibadan) – Headquarters
- Nigeria (Kano)
- Nigeria (Rivers)
- Tanzania (Arusha)
- Tanzania (Dar es Salaam)
- Uganda
- Zambia

== See also ==
- African Agricultural Union
