= International Water Management Institute =

Non-profit international water management research organisation

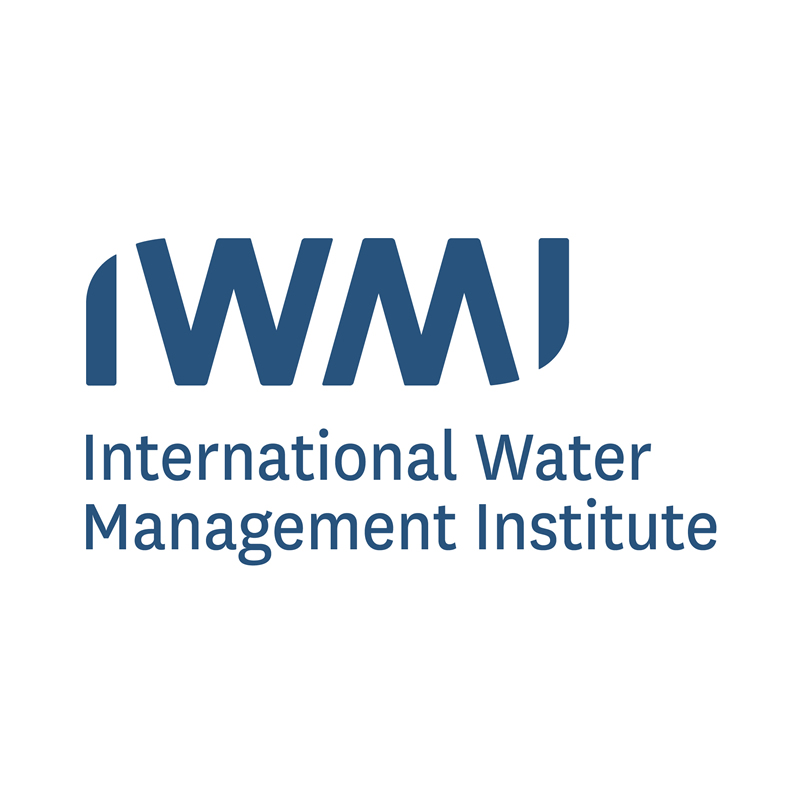
- Formation: 1985
- Type: Nonprofit research organisation
- Purpose: Research
- Location: Sri Lanka (Colombo – Headquarters); India (New Delhi, Anand – Gujarat); Pakistan (Lahore); Laos (Vientiane); Nepal (Kathmandu); Uzbekistan (Tashkent); South Africa (Pretoria); Ghana (Accra); Ethiopia (Addis Ababa), Egypt (Cairo)
- Key people: Dr Mark Smith, Director General; Syon Niyogi, Corporate Services Director
- Parent organization: CGIAR
- Website: www.iwmi.org
- Remarks: IWMI won the 2012 Stockholm Water Prize Laureate

The International Water Management Institute (IWMI) is a non-profit international water management research organisation with its headquarters in Colombo, Sri Lanka, and offices across Africa and Asia. Research at the Institute focuses on improving how water and land resources are managed, with the aim of underpinning food security and reducing poverty while safeguarding the environment.

Its research focuses on: water availability and access, including adaptation to climate change; how water is used and how it can be used more productively; water quality and its relationship to health and the environment; and how societies govern their water resources. In 2012, IWMI was awarded the prestigious Stockholm Water Prize Laureate by Stockholm International Water Institute for its pioneering research, which has helped to improve agricultural water management, enhance food security, protect environmental health and alleviate poverty in developing countries.

IWMI is a member of CGIAR, a global research partnership that unites organizations engaged in research for sustainable development, and leads the CGIAR Research Program on Water, Land and Ecosystems. IWMI was also a partner in the CGIAR Research Programs on: Aquatic Agricultural Systems (AAS); Climate Change, Agriculture and Food Security (CCAFS); Dryland Systems; and Integrated Systems for the Humid Tropics.

== History ==
=== Early focus on irrigation ===
The institute was founded under the name International Irrigation Management Institute (IIMI) in 1985 by the Ford Foundation and the Government of Sri Lanka, supported by the Consultative Group on International Agricultural Research and the World Bank. During the Green Revolution of the 1940s to 1970s, billions of dollars had been spent building large-scale irrigation systems. These contributed, along with new fertilizers, pesticides and high-yielding varieties of seeds, to helping many countries produce greater quantities of food crops. By the mid-1980s, however, these irrigation systems were no longer performing efficiently; IIMI's job was to find out why.

IIMI's researchers discovered that problems affecting irrigation were often more institutional than technical. It advocated ‘Participatory Irrigation Management’ (PIM) as the solution, an approach that sought to involve farmers in water management decisions. In 1992, the Rio de Janeiro Earth Summit gave credence to this approach by recommending that water management be decentralized, with farmers and other stakeholders playing a more important role in managing natural resources. Initially met with resistance, PIM went on to become the status quo for governments and major lending agencies. IIMI became a member of the CGIAR system in 1991.

=== Wider perspective ===
By the mid-1990s, competition for water resources was rising, thanks to a larger global population, expanding cities and increasing industrial applications. Viewing irrigation in isolation was no longer relevant to the global situation. A new approach was needed that would consider it within a river basin context, encompassing competing users and the environment. IIMI began developing new fields of research, on topics such as open and closed basins, water accounting, multiple-use systems, basin institutions, remote sensing analysis and environmental flows. In 1998, its name changed to the International Water Management Institute (IWMI), reflecting this new wider approach.

Although it was becoming evident that water could no longer be considered an "infinite resource", as had been the case in the 1950s when there were fewer people on the planet, no one knew just how scarce the resource was. This prompted IWMI to try to find out. Its research culminated in the publication of Water for food, Water for life: A comprehensive assessment of water management in agriculture. A map within the report showed that a third of the world's population already suffered from ‘water scarcity’. The report defined physical water scarcity, as being where there are insufficient water resources to meet the demands of the population, and economic water scarcity as where water requirements are not satisfied because of a lack of investment in water or human capacity.

=== Averting a global water crisis ===
IWMI's approach towards defining water scarcity provided a new context within which the scientific debate on water availability subsequently became centred. For example, the theme of the UN World Water Day in 2007 was Coping with Water Scarcity; The USA's Worldwatch Institute featured a chapter on water management in its assessment State of the World 2008; and reports published in 2009 by the World Economic Forum and UNESCO concluded that water scarcity is now a bigger threat than the 2008 financial crisis. Dr. Rajendra K. Pachauri, Chair of the Intergovernmental Panel on Climate Change, also highlighted water scarcity at the 2009 Nobel Conference.

If current trends continue, global annual water usage is set to increase by more than two trillion cubic metres by 2030, rising to 6.9 trillion cubic metres. That equates to 40 per cent more than can be provided by available water supplies. At Stockholm World Water Week 2010, IWMI highlighted a six-point plan for averting a water crisis. According to the institute, the following actions are required: 1) gather high-quality data about water resources; 2) take better care of the environment; 3) reform how water resources are governed; 4) revitalize how water is used for farming; 5) better manage urban and municipal demands for water; and 6) involve marginalized people in water management.

In 2011, IWMI celebrated its 25th anniversary by commissioning a series of essays on agricultural and development.

== Using water management to reduce poverty ==
IWM's work in Gujarat, India, exemplifies how improving water management can have an influence on peoples' livelihoods. The state faced the dual problem of bankrupt electricity utilities and depleted groundwater storage following the introduction of electricity subsidies to farmers from around 1970. The situation arose because the subsidies enabled farmers to easily pump groundwater from ever-increasing depths. The Asian Development Bank and World Bank both indicated that governments should cut the electricity subsidies and charge farmers based on metered consumption of power. However, when some state governments tried to do so, the farmers formed such powerful lobbies that several chief ministers lost their seats. A different solution was clearly required.

IWMI scientists who studied the problem suggested governments should introduce ‘intelligent rationing’ of farm power supply by separating the power cables carrying electricity to farmers from those supplying other rural users, such as domestic households and industries. They should then provide farmers with a high-quality power supply for a set number of hours each day at a price they could afford. Eventually Gujarat decided to include these recommendations in a larger programme to reform the electricity utility. A study conducted afterwards found its impacts to be much greater than anticipated. Prior to the change, tube-well owners had been holding rural communities to ransom by ‘stealing’ power for irrigation. After the cables were separated, rural households, schools and industries had a much higher-quality power supply, which in turn boosted individuals’ well-being.

== See also ==
- Environmental impact of irrigation
