= International Livestock Research Institute =

Kenyan-based research institute

- Formation: 1994
- Headquarters: Nairobi, Kenya
- Parent organization: CGIAR
- Website: ilri.org

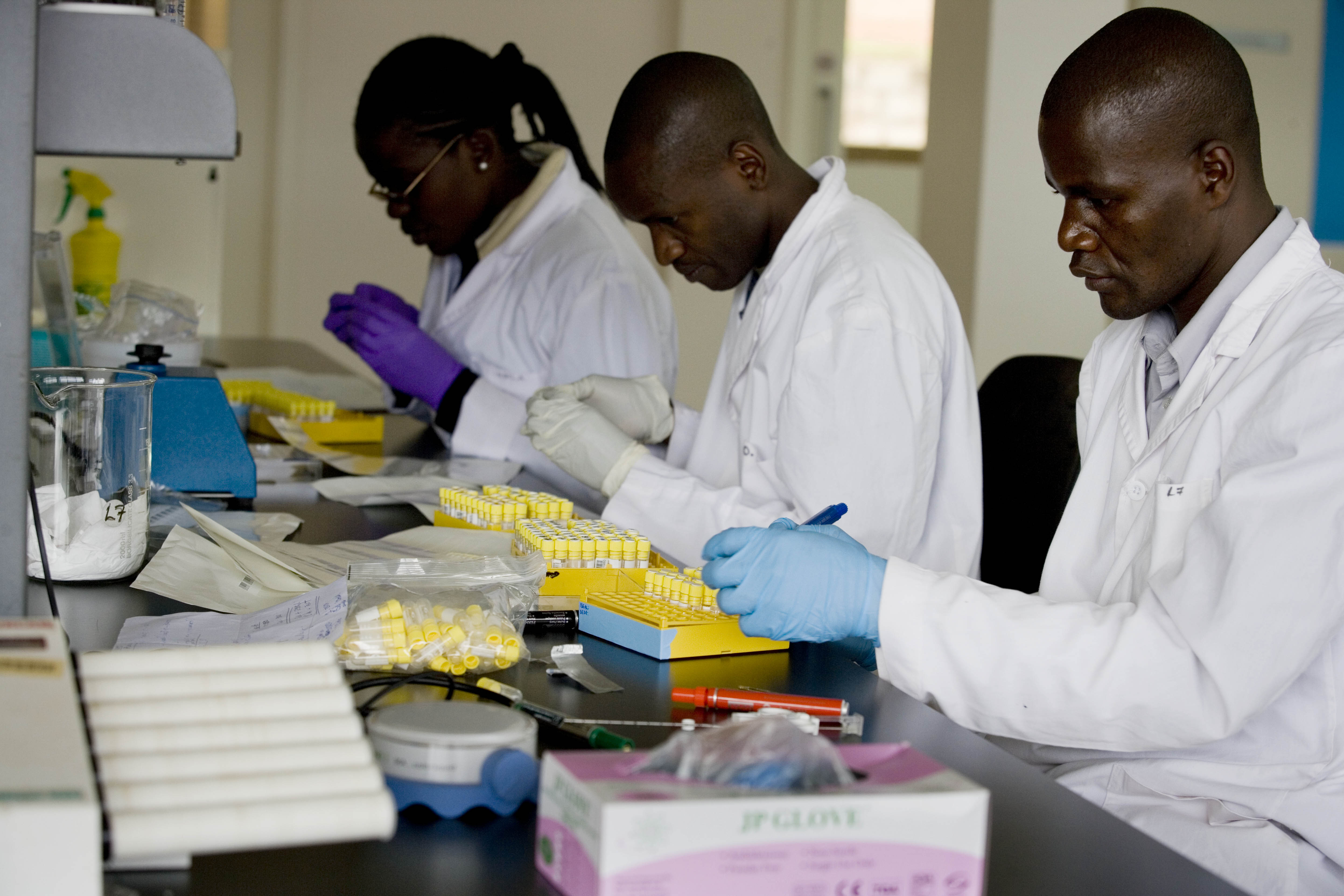
Scientists work in a laboratory at the International Livestock Research Institute in Nairobi, Kenya.

The International Livestock Research Institute or ILRI is an international agricultural research institute within the CGIAR – formerly the Consultative Group for International Agricultural Research. It was established in 1994 by merger of the International Laboratory for Research on Animal Diseases in Nairobi in Kenya, and the International Livestock Centre for Africa in Addis Ababa in Ethiopia. It is a non-profit, non-governmental organisation.

Its research is intended to help to build sustainable livestock pathways out of poverty in low-income countries and to help people in those countries to keep their farm animals alive and productive, to increase and sustain their livestock and farm productivity, and to find profitable markets for their animal products. Research covers five broad areas: the natural environment; food; gender; health; and prosperity.
