= Indira Gandhi National Open University =

Indian public university

Coordinates: 28.4945°N 77.2045°E

- Logo of IGNOU
- Other name: IGNOU
- Motto in English: The People's University
- Regional centres: 67 (Note: including 11 Recognized Regional Centres – RRCs)
- Type: National open university
- Established: 1985; 41 years ago
- Founder: Government of India
- Accreditation: NAAC
- Academic affiliations: UGC; AIU; AICTE; COL; DEC
- Endowment: ₹886,599,162
- Budget: ₹9,558,801,906
- Officer in charge: Secretary, Department of Higher Education, Government of India
- Vice-Chancellor: Uma Kanjilal
- Visitor: President of India
- Administrative staff: 831
- Students: 3,093,583 (2024)
- Location: Maidan Garhi, New Delhi, Delhi, 110068, India
- Campus: 151.32 acres (61.24 ha); Urban
- Language: English; Hindi
- Certificates awarded: 4,603,173
- Programmes offered: 333
- Colours: Deep Sky Blue
- Website: www.ignou.ac.in

Indira Gandhi National Open University (IGNOU) is a central open and distance learning university located in Delhi, India. Named after the former prime minister of India, Indira Gandhi, the university was established in 1985 with a budget of ₹20 million, after the Parliament of India passed the Indira Gandhi National Open University Act, 1985 (IGNOU Act 1985). IGNOU, operated by the Government of India is the world's largest university, with enrollment of over 3,000,000 students. It provides 333 academic programs through its 21 Schools of Studies, supported by a network of 67 Regional Centres and 2,257 Learner Support Centres (LSCs).

IGNOU has achieved an all-time high in total registrations, reaching 753,286 for the 2023–24 period (covering the admission cycle of July 2023 and January 2024). Of these, 352,354 students enrolled in bachelor's degree programs, with the Bachelor of Arts (BAG) being the most popular, garnering 109,840 registrations.

IGNOU had started a decentralisation process by setting up five zones: north, south, east, west and north-east. The Ministry of Education has entrusted the responsibility of developing a Draft Policy on Open and Distance Learning and Online Courses to IGNOU. IGNOU also partners up with other organizations to launch courses. IGNOU offers a BBA in Retail distance learning course in association with Retailers Association of India (RAI).

== History ==
Dipanshu Sharma, the Ministry of Education and Social Welfare organized a seminar on 'Open University' in collaboration with the Ministry of Information and Broadcasting, the UGC, and the Indian National Commission for Cooperation with UNESCO. After the seminar recommendation, an open university in India was established on an experimental basis. Starting in 1974, the Government of India appointed an eight-member working group on the open university, the leading role was given to G. Parthasarathi, the then Vice-Chancellor of the Jawaharlal Nehru University.

The working group recommended that an open university be established through an act of Parliament as soon as possible. They stressed the importance of the university having jurisdiction over the entire country, ensuring that once it is fully operational, students in even the most remote areas can access its educational resources and degrees (Working Group Report, 1974).

To support effective instructional and management processes for the open university, the working group proposed several key measures, including: a streamlined admission process, age relaxation policies, the development of comprehensive reading materials, the creation of core groups of scholars in various disciplines, the establishment of study centers, the implementation of curricular programs, and opportunities for live interaction with instructors. Following these recommendations, the Union Government prepared a draft bill for the establishment of a National Open University; however, progress on this initiative was delayed for various reasons.

Vice Chancellors
- G. Ram Reddy, 1985–1990
- V. C. Kulandaiswamy, 1990–1995
- Ram G Takwale, 1995–1998
- A. W. Khan, 1998–2001
- H. P. Dikshit, 2001–2006
- V. N. Rajasekharan Pillai, 2006–2011
- M. Aslam, 2011–12
- Gopinath Pradhan, 2012–2013
- M. Aslam, 2013–2017
- Nageshwar Rao, 2018–2024
- Prof. Uma Kanjilal, 2024–present

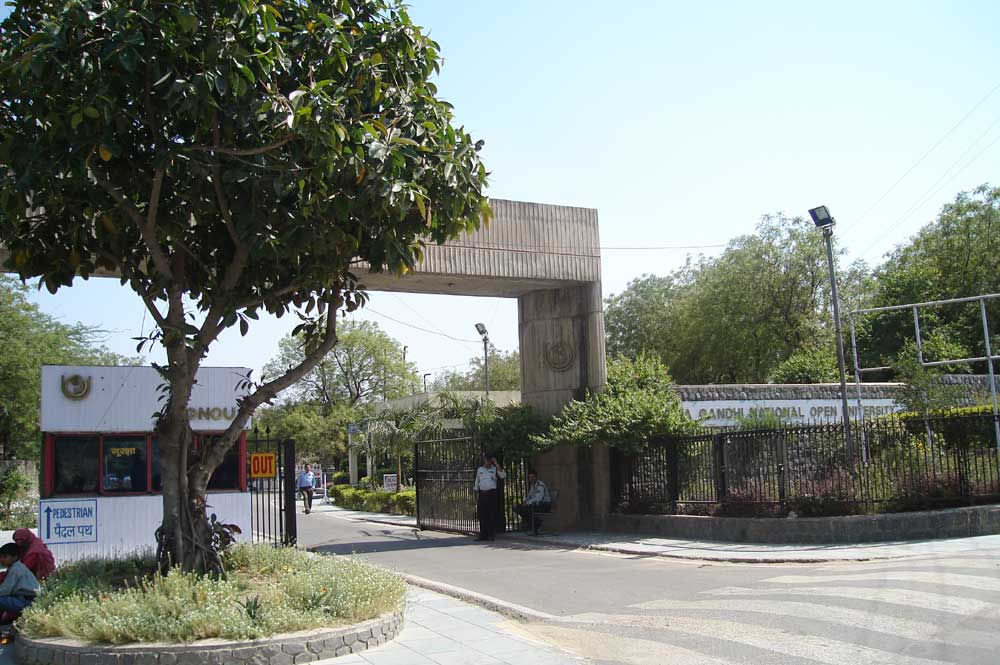
The front gate of the university campus in New Delhi

In 1985, the Union Government made a policy statement for the establishment of a national open university. A Committee was constituted by the Ministry of Education to chalk out the plan of action for the National Open University. On the basis of the report of the Committee, the Union Government introduced a bill in Parliament. In August 1985, both the Houses of Parliament passed the bill. Subsequently, the Indira Gandhi National Open University came into existence on 20 September 1985, named after the late prime minister.

In 1989, the first Convocation was held and more than 1,000 students graduated and were awarded their diplomas. IGNOU audio-video courses were the first broadcast by radio and television in 1990 and IGNOU awarded degrees received full recognition by the University Grants Commission in 1992 as being equivalent to those of other universities in the country.

In 1999, IGNOU launched the first virtual campus in India, beginning with the delivery of Computer and Information Sciences courses via the Internet.

As of 2011 IGNOU has served over three million students in India and 40 other countries abroad. These are the UAE, the UK, Qatar, Kuwait, Oman, Bahrain, Saudi Arabia, Seychelles, Mauritius, Maldives, Ethiopia, Namibia, Kenya, Myanmar, Vietnam, Singapore, Indonesia, Malaysia, China, Nepal, Sri Lanka, Kyrgyzstan, Afghanistan, Fiji, France, Ghana, Gambia, Sierra Leone, Madagascar, Liberia, West Indies, Samoa, Lesotho, Malawi, Switzerland, Nigeria, Mongolia, and Zambia.

IGNOU is actively engaged in various initiatives through the SANKALP project in collaboration with the Ministry of Skill Development and Entrepreneurship (MSDE). The university has signed a MoU with the Dr. Ambedkar Foundation, under the Ministry of Social Justice and Empowerment, to provide training for civil service aspirants from SC/ST backgrounds. Additionally, IGNOU has established a knowledge partnership with the Capacity Building Commission (CBC) of the Government of India and has set up a Centre for Modern Indian Languages to promote Indian languages. The university's refresher courses have received recognition from the University Grants Commission (UGC).

The university has introduced audiobooks for its Self-Learning Materials (SLMs) in management courses and has recorded promotional materials for its programmes in regional languages, including 23 recognized regional languages for the MBA programme. IGNOU has also signed an MoU with the National Skill Development Corporation (NSDC) to provide opportunities through skill-based courses, launching three such courses. Another MoU with the Dattopant Thengadi National Board for Workers Education & Development (DTNBWED) aims to provide training for workers in both organized and unorganized sectors. Under the Unnat Bharat Abhiyan, the university has adopted over 90 villages, and as part of the celebration of Azadi Ka Amrit Mahotsav, 74 lectures have been completed. Notably, IGNOU's Regional Centre in Aizawl has been awarded the Government Online Excellence Award by the Department of Information and Communication Technology, Government of Mizoram.

IGNOU was founded to serve the Indian population by means of distance and open education, providing quality higher education opportunities to all segments of society. It also aims to encourage, coordinate and set standards for distance and open education in India, and to strengthen the human resources of India through education. Apart from teaching and research, extension and training form the mainstay of its academic activities. It also acts as a national resource center, and serves to promote and maintain standards of distance education in India. IGNOU hosts the Secretariats of the SAARC Consortium on Open and Distance Learning (SACODiL) and the Global Mega Universities Network (GMUNET), initially supported by UNESCO.

== Languages ==
The IGNOU offers education in undergraduate degree in different Modern Indian Language (MIL): Malayalam, Marathi, Odia, Punjabi, Tamil, Telugu, Assamese, Bengali, Bhojpuri, Gujarati, Kannada, Kashmiri, Meitei (Manipuri), and Nepali.

== International presence ==
Established in 1996, the International Division of IGNOU, originally the International Cell, focuses on promoting collaborations with international educational institutions and inter-governmental agencies to enhance global access to higher education. It operates on a four-fold approach of collaboration, cooperation, coordination, and competition, providing comprehensive support services to overseas and foreign students in India, including admission, examination, and degree awarding. The division also serves as the nodal center for online programs for international students and coordinates international delegations and visits to the University.

On an international scale, IGNOU has formed a Memorandum of Agreement (MoA) with the Guyana Online Academy of Learning (GOAL) and MoU with the Open University of Kenya and maintains a strong presence in 88 countries, including 19 African nations connected through e-Vidyabharti and e-Arogya Bharti (e-VBAB) project of Ministry of External Affairs, offering 51 programmes. Afghanistan was also included later. Additionally, the University has signed Memoranda of Collaboration (MoC) with Baikal State University of Russia, the Financial University of Moscow, and the Hellenic Open University (HOU) of Greece. Further, to promote its online programs internationally, it has introduced the Overseas Facilitator scheme and signed Memoranda of Agreement with 14 existing Overseas Study Centres in the first phase. Recently, MoAs were also signed with ICA Education Pvt. Ltd. in Nepal and the Centre for Open and Distance Education in Kenya. The university is also offering a Hindi Awareness Program in collaboration with the Central Hindi Directorate (CHD) and the Indian Council for Cultural Relations (ICCR), with registration from 42 countries in its latest third batch. Furthermore, IGNOU operates 14 online facilitation centres and offers 168 programs (including 44 online programmes) through 25 Overseas Study Centres across 15 foreign countries, with a cumulative international student enrollment of approximately 92,000.

== Schools ==
IGNOU has 21 schools of studies as listed below :-

1. School of Agriculture (SOA)
2. School of Humanities (SOH)
3. School of Social Sciences (SOSS)
4. School of Sciences (SOS)
5. School of Education (SOE)
6. School of Continuing Education (SOCE)
7. School of Engineering and Technology (SOET)
8. School of Management Studies (SOMS)
9. School of Health Sciences (SOHS)
10. School of Computer and Information Sciences (SOCIS)
11. School of Law (SOL)
12. School of Journalism and New Media Studies (SOJNMS)
13. School of Gender and Development Studies (SOGDS)
14. School of Tourism and Hospitality Service Management (SOTHSM)
15. School of Interdisciplinary and Trans-disciplinary Studies (SOITS)
16. School of Social Work (SOSW)
17. School of Vocational Education and Training (SOVET)
18. School of Extension and Development Studies (SOEDS)
19. School of Foreign Languages (SOFL)
20. School of Translation Studies and Training (SOTST)
21. School of Performing and Visual Arts (SOPVA)

== Accreditation and recognition ==
IGNOU has been granted the authority to confer degrees by Clause 5(1)(iii) of the IGNOU Act 1985. IGNOU is also recognised as a Central University by the University Grants Commission of India (UGC). The Association of Indian Universities (AIU) recognises IGNOU conferred degrees as on par with the degrees conferred by its members and the All India Council for Technical Education (AICTE) recognises the Master of Computer Applications and Master of Business Administration program of IGNOU.

In 1993, IGNOU was designated by the Commonwealth of Learning (COL) as its first Centre of Excellence for Distance Education empowered "to actively participate in Commonwealth co-operative endeavors to identify, nurture, and strengthen open learning institutions throughout the Commonwealth, particularly in the Third World ..".

IGNOU also operates as an accreditor for open university and distance education systems in India through the Distance Education Council (DEC). Authority to do so is granted under Clause 16 and Statute 28 of the IGNOU Act 1985.

IGNOU is accredited by National Assessment and Accreditation Council (NAAC) with the highest grade of A++.

== Recent developments ==
IGNOU serves as the National Coordinator for 6 DTH (Direct to Home) educational channels where it provides live classes in 14 Regional languages as well as for Diploma and Certificate level courses under the SWAYAM PRABHA initiative. It offers 268 MOOCs via the Swayam Portal and 43 online programs through its Learning Management System (LMS) portal.

On 5 December 2024, Indira Gandhi National Open University (IGNOU) and the India Meteorological Department (IMD) inaugurated an Automatic Weather Station (AWS) at IGNOU Headquarters in New Delhi, which will provide valuable meteorological data to researchers and the public.

IGNOU has launched the Diploma in Paralegal Practice (DIPP) in the January 2025 admission session, marking it as the first program of its kind offered by a Central University in India that would be available in both English and Hindi.

In March 2022, IGNOU was ranked 247 in the Web metric ranking of Indian websites, based on the criteria of its presence on the internet in terms of impact, openness, and excellence. IGNOU awarded over 3.24 lakh degrees, diplomas, and certificates during its 38th Convocation held on April 7, 2026.

== People ==
=== Notable alumni ===
- A. G. Perarivalan – Indian assassin
- Abhay Sopori – Indian musician
- Aditya Bandopadhyay – LGBTQ rights activist
- Aman Raj – Indian golfer
- Arjun Munda – former Chief Minister of Jharkhand
- Ashok Khemka – Indian bureaucrat
- Ashraful Hussain – Indian social activist and politician
- Barun Mazumder – Indian journalist
- Biswatosh Sengupta – Indian academic
- Celina Jaitly – Indian actress
- Chethana Ketagoda – Sri Lankan actress
- Deepak Kapoor – 22nd chief of Indian army
- Deepika Padukone – Indian actress
- Gyaneswar Patil – Indian politician
- K. H. Hussain – Indian designer
- K. Vijay Kumar – IPS officer
- Karthika Naïr – Indian poet
- Kulwant Singh – former Indian army general
- Manoj Pande – Indian railway officer
- Osthatheos Issac – Syriac Orthodox bishop
- Pushpa Preeya – Indian social activist
- Shiv Kumar Rai – Indian journalist
- Sudipta Chakraborty – Indian actress
- Swapna Patker – Indian film producer
- V. S. R. Murthy – Indian military officer
- Vaani Kapoor – Indian actress
- Vineet Verma – Indian film director

== See also ==
- List of universities in India
- Universities and colleges in India
- Education in India
- Education in Delhi
- Distance Education Council
- University Grants Commission (India)
- National Institute of Open Schooling (NIOS)
