= Benu Sen =

Indian photographer (1932–2011)

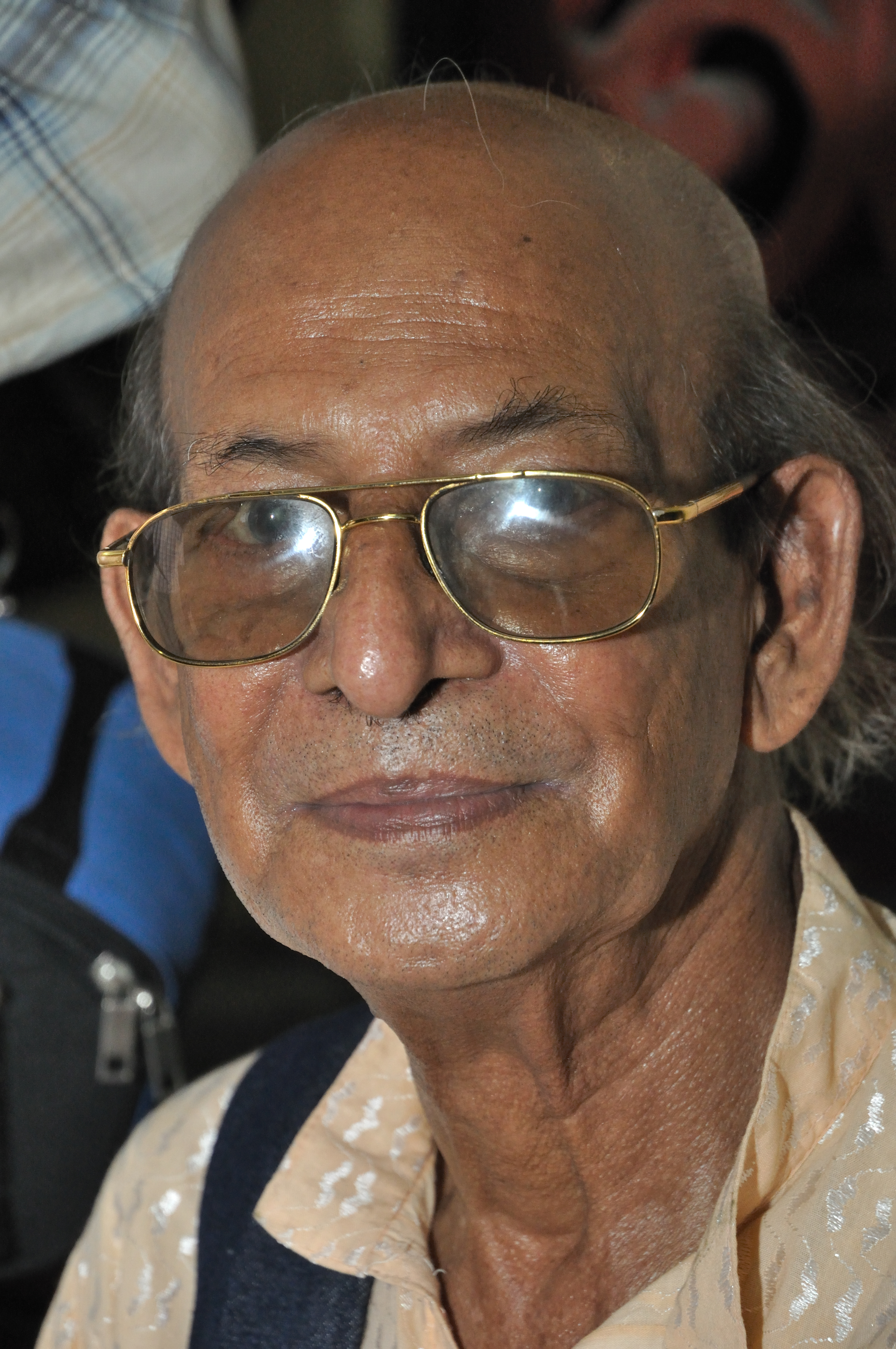
- Sen at Academy of Fine Arts, Kolkata.
- Born: 26 May 1932; Kolkata, British India
- Died: 17 May 2011 (aged 78); Barasat, India
- Occupation: Photographer
- Employer: Indian Museum
- Organization: Photographic Association of Dum Dum
- Notable work: Pictorial Photography, BS-4 (fine grain developer)
- Children: One daughter, Banhi
- Parent(s): Manindranath Sengupta, Provabati Sengupta
- Relatives: Biswatosh Sengupta
- Awards: FRPS, MFIAP

Benu Sen (26 May 1932 – 17 May 2011) was an Indian photographer from Kolkata, India. He was the second son among seven children of Manindranath and Provabati Sengupta.

He was the Secretary General of the Federation of Indian Photography (FIP), the Indian chapter of the Fédération Internationale de l'Art Photographique (FIAP), and president of the Photographic Association of Dum Dum (PAD). In his book, History of Journalism: A Legend of Glory, Prof. Santanu Banerjee mentioned, "His passion was to guide the oncoming photographers in the profession. During his life span, he made a pretty number of students dazzled in the arena of photography."

== Career ==
A Photography Unit was set up in the Indian Museum in 1964 for photo documentation of art objects. Sen was in-charge of the unit. He retired from the museum as Photo Officer in 1990 having contributed many photographic works both in the field of social and cultural anthropology and museum related photographs.

== Publications ==
=== Publications by Sen ===
- Art of Photography (1979)

=== Publications paired with others ===
- Learn Photography. Photographic Association of Dum Dum.
- Experimental Photography. Photographic Association of Dum Dum.

== Awards ==
- Life-Time Achievement award of Rs. 100,000 and a citation in the pictorialists category conferred by the Vice-President of India, Mohammad Hamid Ansari, 2010, New Delhi.
- Master of Photography (MFIAP), Fédération Internationale de l'Art Photographique
- Fellowship of the Royal Photographic Society of Great Britain (FRPS), 1975
- EFIAP, Fédération Internationale de l'Art Photographique, 1960
- ESFIAP, Fédération Internationale de l'Art Photographique, 1972
- FJIAP (Japan)
- FNPAS (Sri Lanka)
- FPBS (Bangladesh)
- FPAD (India)
- FCOS (Romania)

== Health issues and death ==
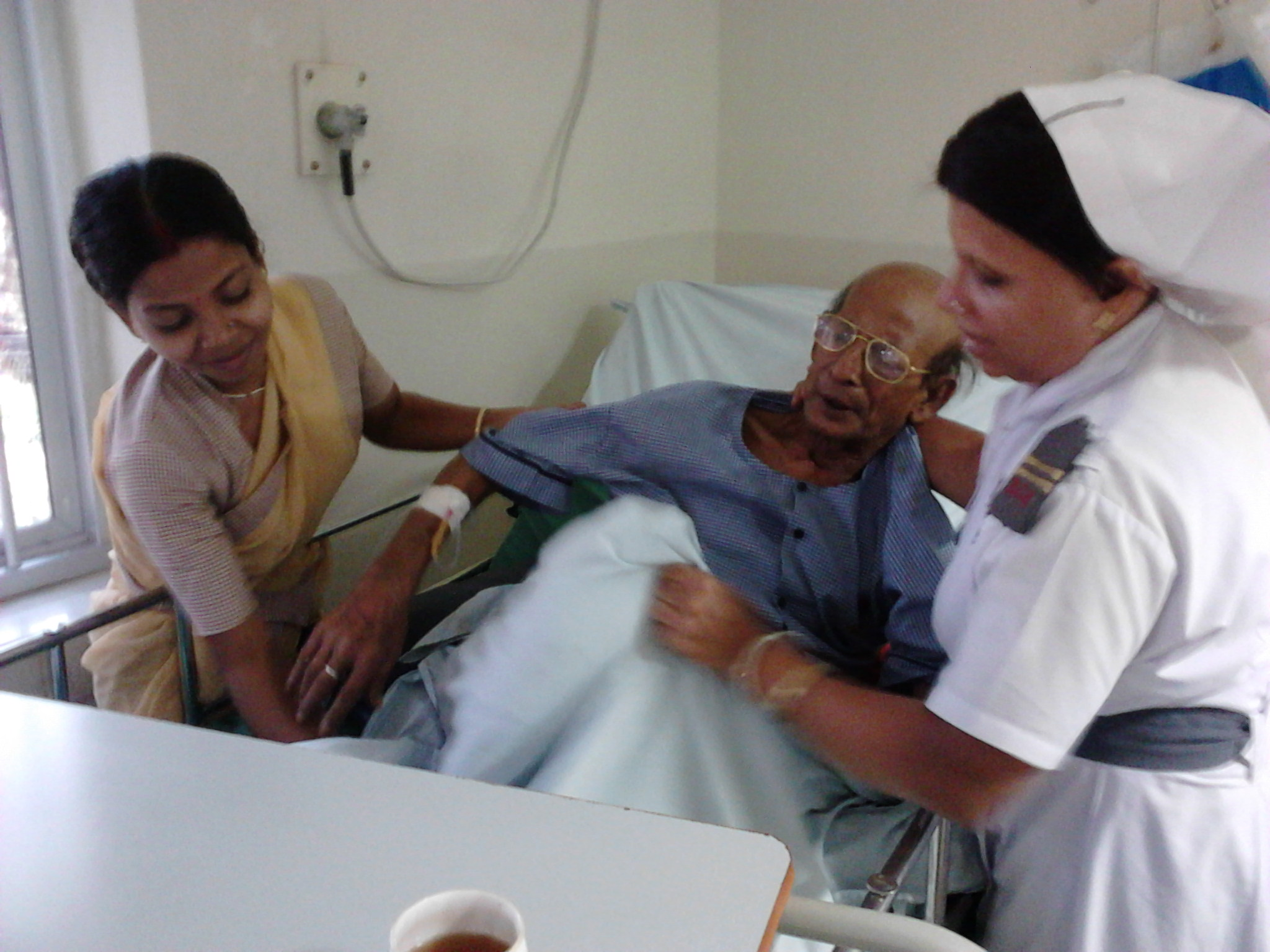
Benu Sen is being comforted by hospital staff on 1 May 2011 at Barasat.

Sen was undergoing treatment at a private hospital in Barasat near Kolkata, from 7 to 15 April 2011, as he had been suffering from retention of urine due to prostate enlargement and low haemoglobin count due to his previous heart problem with diabetes mellitus. Surgery of the prostate gland was suggested.

On the evening of 19 April 2011 Benu Sen was readmitted to the previous hospital at Barasat, for a pre-surgical preparation of prostate gland

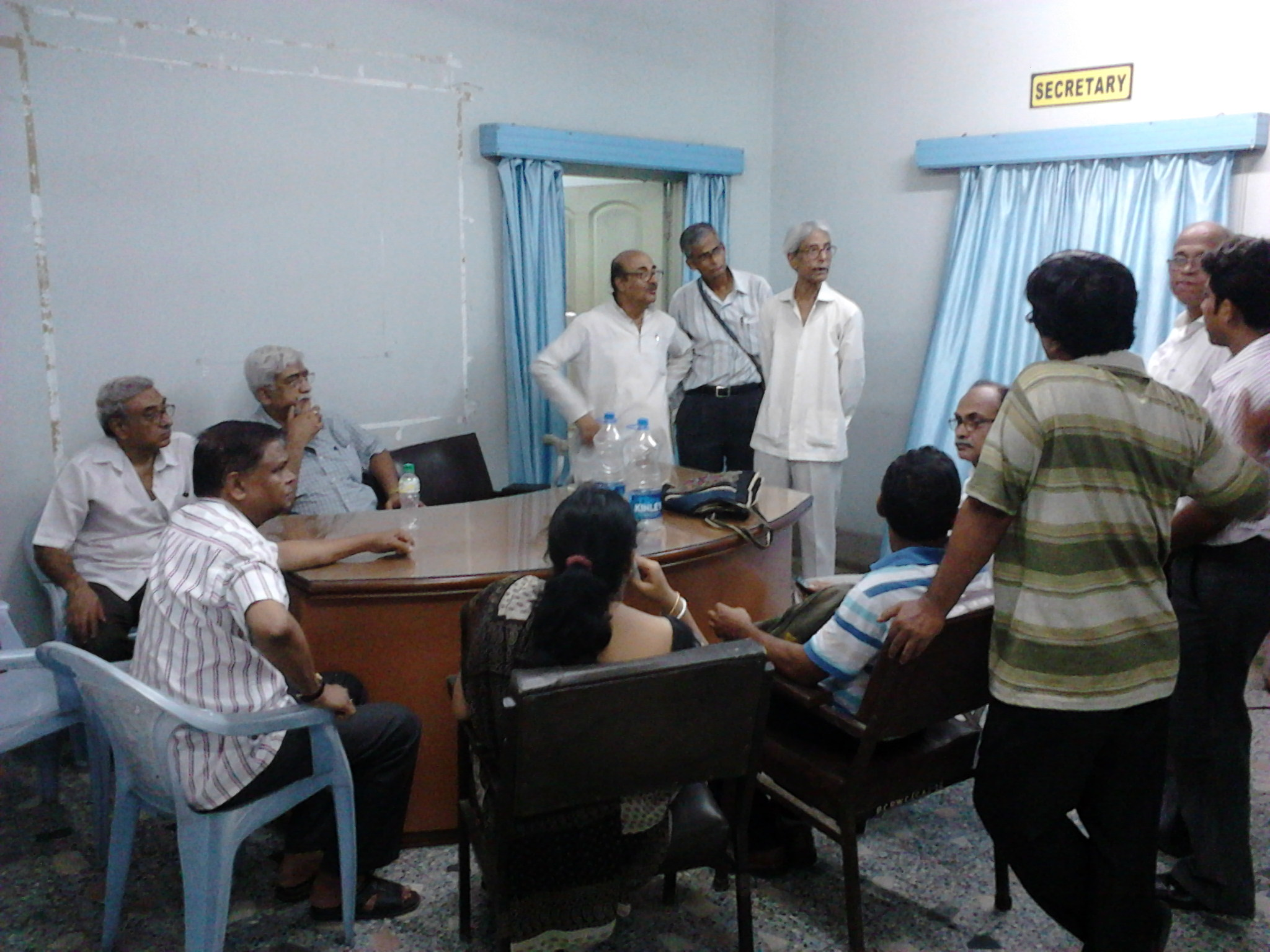
Several meetings held by the senior persons of Photographic Association of Dum Dum and the hospital personnel on 16 May 2011 for the health crisis of Benu Sen at Barasat.

surgery. Some physiological problems developed due to his old age. On 16 May 2011 Sen suffered from a serious chest infection, leading to the deterioration of his health and he was transferred to the Intensive Care Unit (ICU). He died on 17 May 2011 in Barasat.
