= M. Aslam =

Indian academic

Prof.M. Aslam
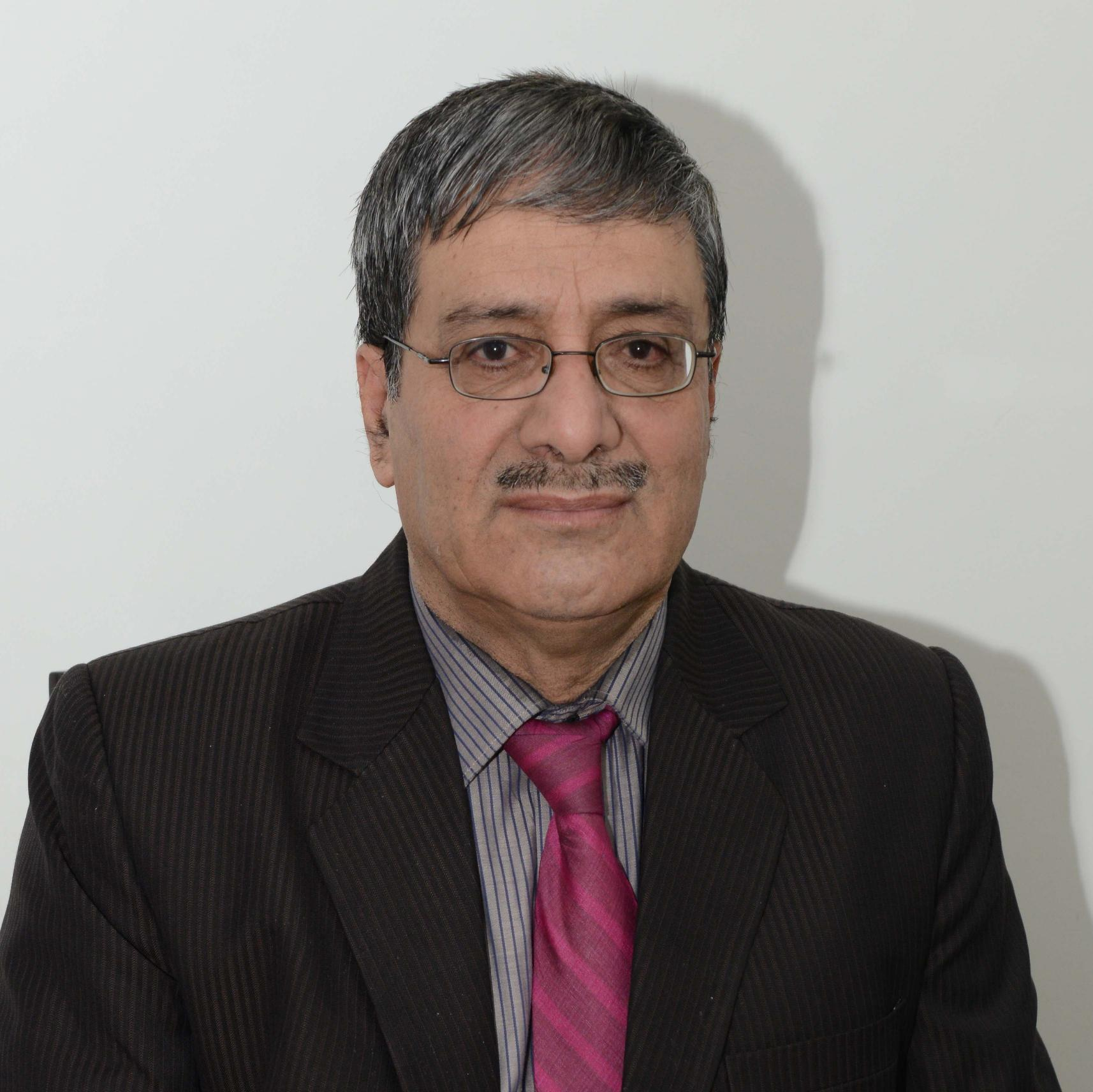

Vice Chancellor of the Indira Gandhi National Open University

Chairman of Distance Education Council of India.
- In office March, 2013 – July, 2017
- Preceded by: Prof. VRN Rajashekaran Pillai
- Succeeded by: Prof. Nageshwar Rao

vice-chancellor Indira Gandhi National Open University
- In office March 2013 – July 2017
- Preceded by: Prof. VRN Rajashekaran Pillai
- Succeeded by: Prof. Nageshwat Rao

Personal details
- Profession: Academician

M. Aslam is an Indian sociologist. He served as Vice Chancellor of the Indira Gandhi National Open University and Chairman of Distance Education Council of India. He spent about 26 years as professor at Indira Gandhi National Open University.

== Career ==
Aslam served as a consultant to organizations such as FAO and UNDP and as Fellow of the Economic Development Institute of the World Bank. He served as visiting faculty to institutions in India and abroad. He has authored 8 books and hundreds of papers.
