= Ketagoda =

Ketagoda is a surname. Notable people with the surname include:

- Chethana Ketagoda (born 1992), Sri Lankan actress
- Jayantha Ketagoda, Sri Lankan politician
