= Nageshwar Rao =

Indian professor

- Born: 1957 (age 68–69)
- Occupations: Professor, Academic administrator
- Known for: Vice Chancellor of IGNOU

Academic work
- Discipline: Commerce, Business Management

Nageshwar Rao (born 1957) is a retired Indian professor who served as Vice Chancellor of Indira Gandhi National Open University, the largest open university in the world, and former Director of the Central Hindi Directorate, and served as Director of the Indian Institute of Advanced Study, Vice Chancellor of Uttarakhand Open University, and Uttar Pradesh Rajarshi Tandon Open University, and is an Honorary Fellow of the Commonwealth of Learning.

== Academic career ==
Rao served as Professor from October 1990 to December 2013 at the Pt. Jawaharlal Nehru Institute of Business Management (Pt. JNIBM), Vikram University, Ujjain. He was also a Reader in the Faculty of Management Studies at Banaras Hindu University, Varanasi, between February 1985 and October 1990, and a Lecturer in the Department of Commerce & Business Administration at the University of Allahabad, Allahabad, between July 1978 and February 1985.

== Administrative roles ==
Rao held several key academic administrative roles:

- Chairman EC-NAAC
- Vice Chancellor, Indira Gandhi National Open University
- Vice Chancellor, Uttarakhand Open University
- Vice Chancellor, Uttar Pradesh Rajarshi Tandon Open University
- Director, Central Hindi Directorate
- Director, Indian Institute of Advanced Study

== Honours ==
- Honorary Fellow of the Commonwealth of Learning
