= Dundalk Photographic Society =

- Formation: 1979
- Headquarters: Dundalk, County Louth
- Location: Ireland

Dundalk Photographic Society is an amateur camera club based in Dundalk, County Louth in Ireland. In December 2008, the club took 11th place in an annual competition run by the International Federation of Photographic Art (FIAP). Prior to this, in 2007, the society had entered a global competition in the United Arab Emirates, achieving a sixth-place finish.

In December 2010, Dundalk Photographic Society improved on its 2008 success by winning the 2010 FIAP Club World Cup. The society saw off competition from 123 other photography clubs from around the world to claim the title. A group of approximately 15 club members travelled to the FIAP headquarters in Paris, France to accept the FIAP World Cup Trophy on 12 February 2011.

In November 2009, the club published a limited edition book entitled "Dundalk Photographic Society, Celebrating 30 Years: The Art of Photography". The book featured over 200 images from members of the club and contained a foreword from President Mary McAleese.
