= Manoj Pandey =

Manoj Pandey may refer to:

- Manoj Pande (born 1962), 23rd Chief of the Indian Army
- Manoj Kumar Pandey (politician) (born 1968), Indian politician
- Manoj Kumar Pandey (1975–1999), officer of the Indian Army
- Manoj Pande (civil servant) (fl. from 1989), Indian railways officer
