= Biswatosh Sengupta =

Indian academic (born 1944)

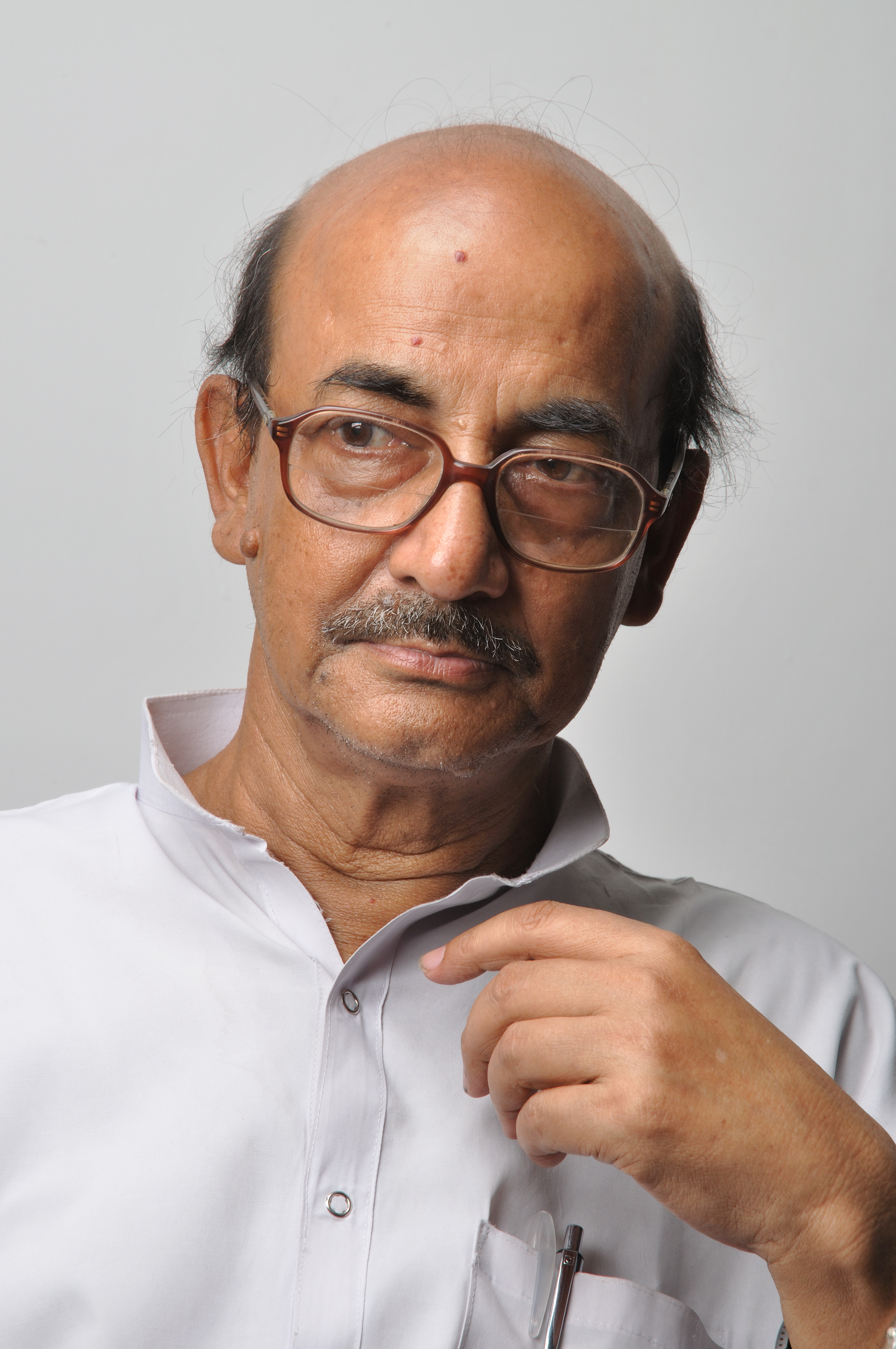
- Born: 11 September 1944 (age 81); Kolkata, British India
- Other name: Jagai
- Education: M Stat., MCA
- Occupation: Educationist
- Employer(s): B P Poddar Institute of Management & Technology
- Organization: Photographic Association of Dum Dum
- Notable work: Construction of Birth Table, Computer Graphic Art
- Title: Professor
- Spouse: Kanika Sengupta
- Children: One (Biswamoy Sengupta)
- Parent(s): Manindranath Sengupta, Provabati Sengupta
- Relatives: Benu Sen (elder brother) Debatosh Sengupta (younger brother)
- Awards: AFIAP, ESFIAP, Hon.FBPS & Hon.FNPAS

Biswatosh Sengupta (born 11 September 1944) is an Indian academic. He is the fourth son among seven children of Manindranath and Provabati Sengupta.

== Education ==
Sengupta had done B.Sc. Honors in Mathematics from Calcutta University, 1966. Obtained Certificate in statistics from Indian Statistical Institute (ISI) in the same year. After that he had done master's degree in Statistics (M. Stat) from ISI, 1969 and in also did Post Graduate Diploma in Demography from ISI and Summer Course on Population from East-West Centre, Hawaii, United States and Korean Institute of family planning, Seoul, South Korea, in 1974 with a special Workshop on Demographic Survey Research Methods. He also took an In-service training course on Management and Planning of Environment from the Administrative Training Institute (ATI), Govt. of West Bengal in 1985. He did a Post Graduate Diploma in Creative Writing in English (DCE) in 1995, a Diploma in Computer in Office Management (DCO) in 1998 and Master's in Computer Application (MCA) in the year 2006 from Indira Gandhi National Open University (IGNOU). He was also trained on Geographic Information System (GIS) from ATI in August 2004. In 2010, he completed the Post Graduate Diploma in ‘Appreciation of Indian Art’, from the Ramakrishna Mission Institute of Culture, Kolkata.

== Career ==
Biswatosh was the Additional Director-in-Charge in Socio-Economic Planning and Appraisal Maintaining Evaluation in Kolkata Metropolitan Development Authority (KMDA), Salt Lake. He retired from there on 30 September 2004. His specializations are Statistics, Demography, Planning and Information Technology. At present he is working as a Professor in Information Technology and Head of the Department of BCA at B P Poddar Institute of Management & Technology, situated in Kolkata.

== Work ==
He was a former member of, the University Grant Commission Curriculum Development Committee for Visual Art. Honorary Joint Secretary, Photographic Association of Dum Dum (PAD) since 1973 and editor of IMAGE, a publication of PAD since 1974. He was also an ex-member of Working Group on Perspective Plan for Calcutta Metropolitan Area(CMA), State Planning Board, Government of West Bengal, and initially he was associated with the Calcutta Fertility Survey of ISI, 1970–72, and later associated with the Socio-Economic Survey of KMDA (formerly CMDA), 1996.

== Awards and distinctions ==
He was awarded AFIAP distinction for outstanding contribution in the field of Fine art photography in 1975 and ESFIAP for Excellent Service for the cause of International Photography in 1985 by the Fédération Internationale de l'Art Photographique. He was conferred the Honorary Fellowship of The National Photographic Art Society, Sri Lanka in 1984.The very recent Bangladesh Photographic Society conferred a Fellowship on Sengupta.

== Exhibition ==
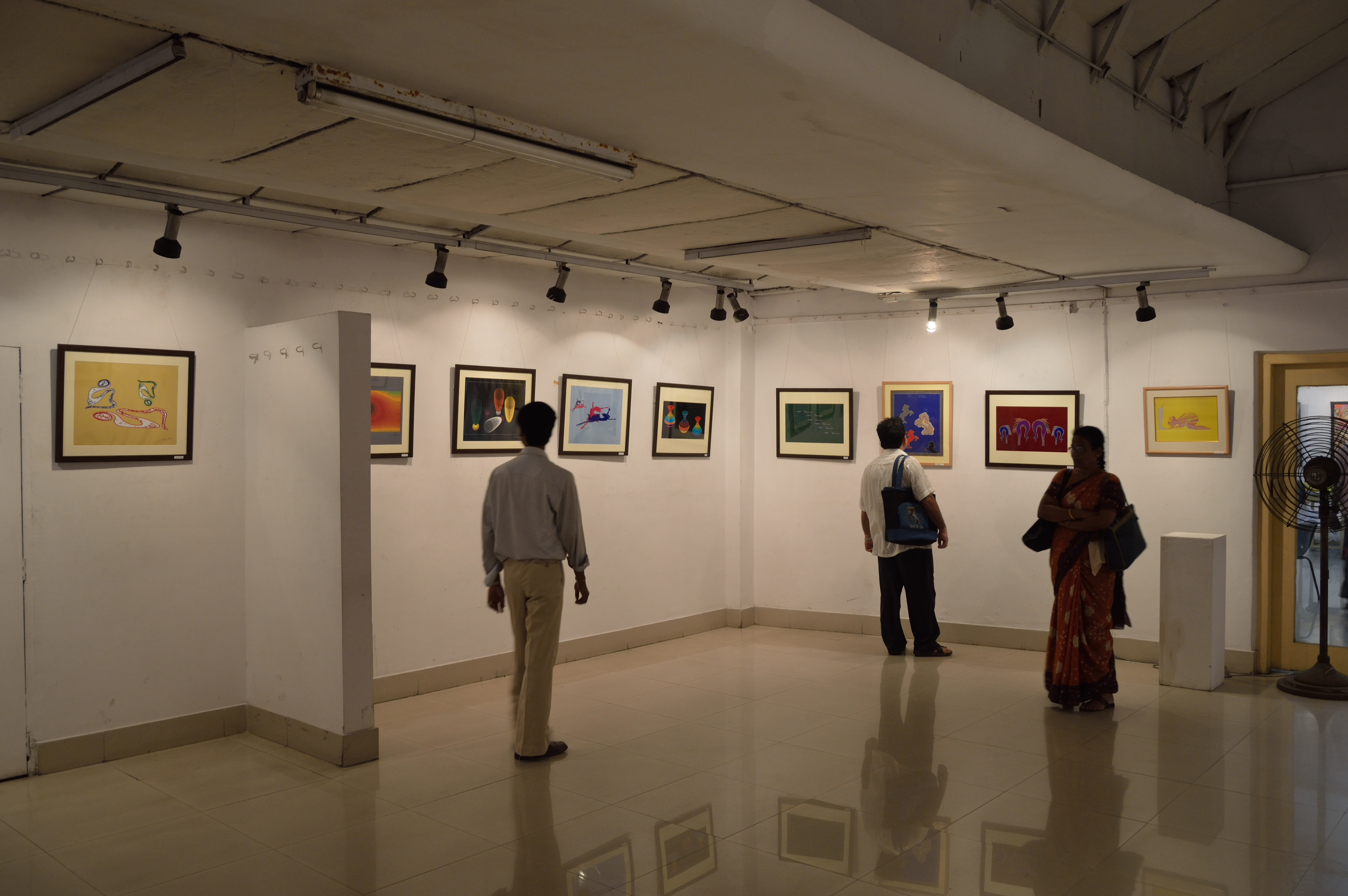
The third solo exhibition.

First solo exhibition on paintings with computer graphics ‘Graphic Art’ using ‘C’ and ‘C++’ held at the Indian Museum, Kolkata in 2009. The second solo exhibition on the same title with a similar technique was held at the Academy of Fine Arts, Kolkata, from 22 – 28 July 2010
and the third solo exhibition on Graphic Art using C, C++ and MATLAB was held at the same gallery of Kolkata from 3–9 October 2012. His 4th solo exhibition on Creative Photography will be held on 11 December 2013 for three days at the Gaganendra Silpa Pradarshasala, Kolkata .

== Published work ==
- Sengupta, Biswatosh; Bandyopadhyay, Mrinal Kumar (2009). "Policy issues for e-government services for rural areas". International Journal of Electronic Democracy. 1 (2): 136–148. doi:10.1504/IJED.2009.028543. ;
- Co-author of Learn Photography and Experimental Photography, published by Photographic Association of Dum Dum.
