= Czesław Siemianowski =

Polish photographer (1937–2021)

- Born: 11 January 1937; Lviv
- Died: 3 October 2021 (aged 84); Gliwice, Poland
- Occupation: Photographer
- Website: czeslawsiemianowski.weebly.com

Czesław Siemianowski (11 January 1937 – 3 October 2021) was a Polish photographer, honored with the title of *Artiste* by the International Federation of Photographic Art (AFIAP). He was a board member of the Gliwice Photographic Society.

== Biography ==
Son of Jan and Bogumiła, Czesław Siemianowski was born in Lviv, where he spent his childhood. After World War II ended, he settled in Gliwice in 1945, becoming an active promoter of photographic activities. In 1952, he joined the Gliwice branch of the Polish Photographic Society (1948–1961), which transformed into the Gliwice Photographic Society in 1961, where he served on the board for many years and was vice-president for one term.

Siemianowski participated in numerous photographic exhibitions: solo, group, outdoor, and competitive. He actively participated in International Photographic Salons, often under the patronage of FIAP, winning numerous medals, awards, distinctions, diplomas, and commendations. His achievements in these salons earned him the honorary title *Artiste FIAP (AFIAP)* in 1972, awarded by the International Federation of Photographic Art, now based in Luxembourg.

In 2008, he participated in a charity photo auction supporting the ceramics workshop of the Special School Complex No. 3 in Bytom.

His photographs are part of the collection at the Museum in Gliwice.

Siemianowski died on 3 October 2021 in Gliwice.

== Selected Exhibitions ==
- "International Portrait Salon" (Gdańsk, 1963)
- "International Photography Salon" (Katowice, 1963)
- "International Photography Salon" (Budapest, 1963)
- "Energy and People" (Gliwice, 1963)
- "National Photography Exhibition" (Częstochowa, 1963)
- "Annual GTF Exhibition" (Gliwice, 1963)
- "Tree in Nature" (Poznań, 1964)
- "International Interphoto Salon" (Prague, 1966)
- "GTF Exhibition" (Hungary; Győr, 1967)
- "Jubilee GTF Exhibition" (Gliwice, 1967)
- "Small Forms" (Warsaw, 1967)
- "Village and Folklore" (Olsztyn, 1968)
- "Homo" (Legnica, 1968)
- "Reportage" (Płock, 1968)
- "Oath" (Gliwice, 1969)
- "Expo69" (Poznań, 1969)
- "World Cup" (Geneva, Switzerland, 1969)
- "Woman" (Wrocław, 1969)
- "International Photography Salon" (Katowice, 1969)
- "International Portrait Salon" (Gdańsk, 1970)
- "Your Homeland" (Bytom, 1970)
- "FIAP Jubilee Exhibition" (Warsaw, 1970)
- "National Nude and Portrait Exhibition – Venus" (Kraków, 1970)
- "International Photography Salon" (India, 1972)
- "Igro Eyes" (Gliwice, 1973)
