= Bilan Liao =

Author & art professor

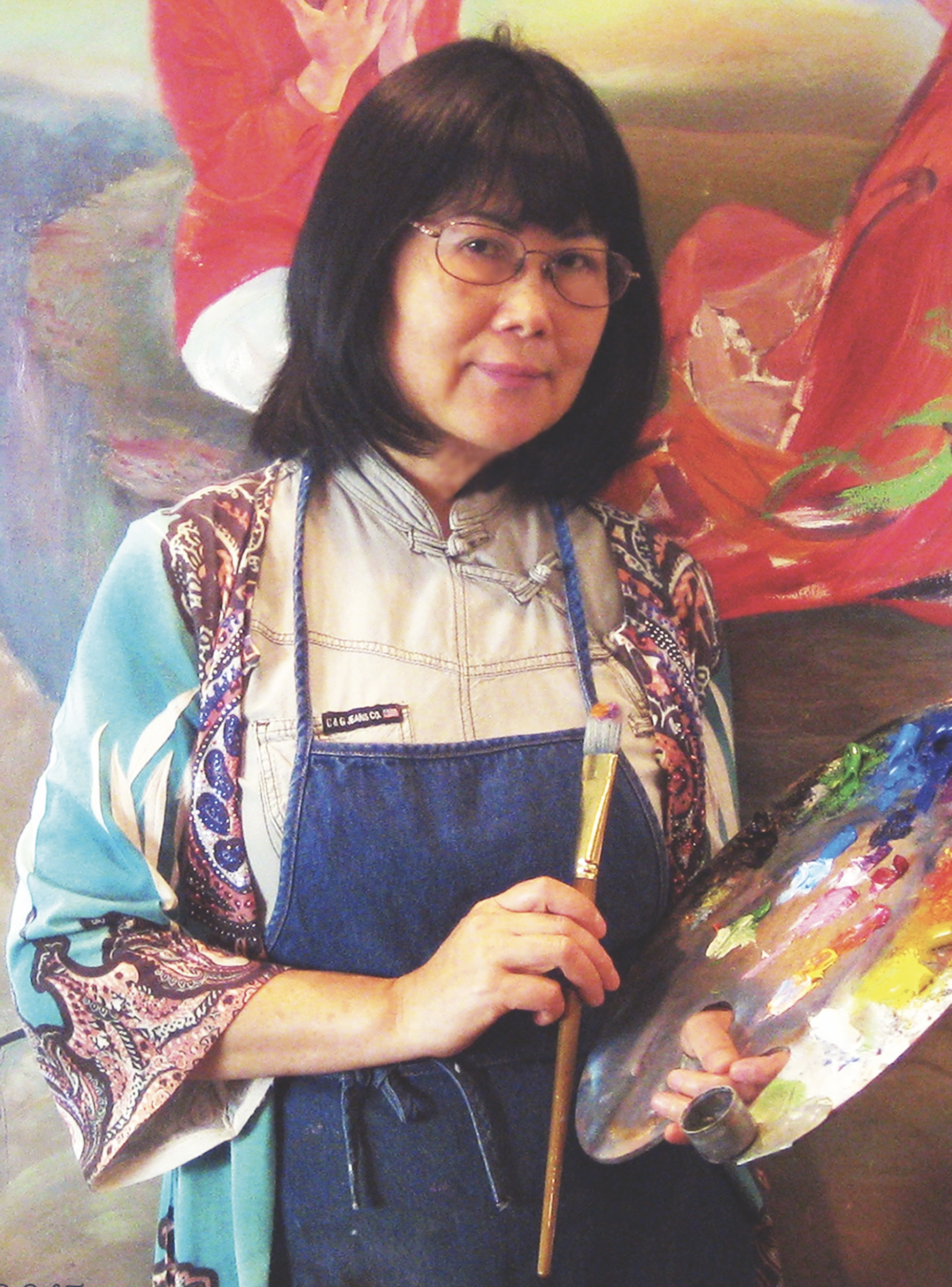
- Education: MA and MFA
- Occupation(s): Art professor, author and director

Bilan Liao is a retired art professor, author and director who organized different national & international events in China, including the Fédération Internationale de l'Art Photographique photography competition in Longgang.

== Early life and career ==
Bilan completed her graduation in fresco painting and art history in Italy and obtained two graduate degrees in fine arts (MA and MFA). In 2008, she was appointed lead of the Painting Department at Paducah School of Art and Design, KY. In 2016, the city of Paducah awarded Bilan the title of "Duchess" after her retirement. She was the director of the Painting and Photography Department in Baoan and Longgang, China, Executive Editor of the Longgang Newspaper, and Vice Chairwoman of the Literature, Art and Culture Association in Longgang. Shenzhen. Her documentary short "An Artist’s Journey from China to America" received over 60 awards/selections from national and international filmmaker festivals. In 2021, the Georgia state government awarded Bilan the title of "Outstanding Georgia Citizen and Ambassador."
