= Serhii Buslenko =

Ukrainian photographer (born 1959)

- Сергій Бусленко
- Born: Serhii Petrovych Buslenko; March 4, 1959 (age 66); Rivne

Serhii Petrovych Buslenko (Ukrainian: Сергій Петрович Бусленко, born 4 March 1959, Rivne) is a Ukrainian photographer. MFIAP (2012), EFIAP/g and official representative of the Fédération Internationale de l'Art Photographique in Ukraine. He is a member of the Royal Photographic Society of Great Britain (1994), the American Photographic Association (official representative in Ukraine), the European Union of Professional Photographers, and the National Union of Photographers of Ukraine.

== Biography ==
Head of the Rivne Regional Organization of the National Union of Photographers of Ukraine and the Chas Photo Club.

He speaks English.

== Creative work ==
In 1985, he began to practice artistic photography.

Since 1997, he has been fond of underwater photography.

Participant of 650 international exhibitions and competitions, as well as 28 personal exhibitions in Ukraine, China, Croatia, Hungary, Germany, Greece, France, Poland, Romania, Switzerland, Taiwan.

His works have been published in Digital Photographer, Photography yearbook, Photo Suisse, Foto-video, Popular Photography, Die Magie der Fotografie, Fotomagazin, Chasseur d'images, Photo grafoz, Foto, DFOTO.

== Awards and honors ==
- Master of Photography of the International Federation of Photographic Arts (2012)
- Honored Artist of the International Federation of Photographic Arts with a gold medal
- 35 gold medals
- 5 grand prix
- honorary member of the Horizon (Sibiu, Romania) and Nufarul (Oradea, Romania) photo clubs
- two-year presidential scholarships (2012, 2015, 2021).
