= G. Ram Reddy =

Indian academic (1929–1995)

G Ram Reddy
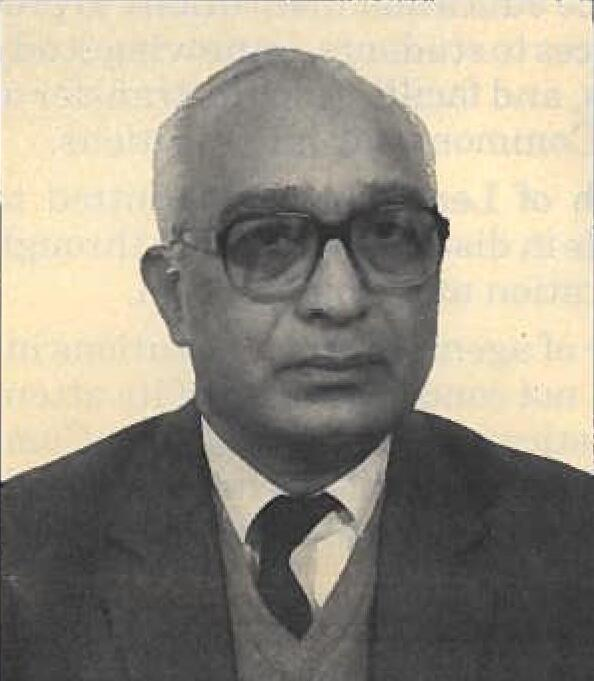

University Grants Commission
- In office 1990–1995

1st Vice Chancellor of the Indira Gandhi National Open University
- In office 1985–1990
- Succeeded by: V C Kulandaiswamy

1st Vice Chancellor of the Andhra Pradesh Open University
- In office 1982–1985

12th Vice Chancellor Osmania University
- In office 1977–1982

1st Chairman Social Sciences Research Council
- In office 1969–1974

Personal details
- Born: December 4, 1929 Mylaram, Nizam's Dominion present day Karimnagar district, Telangana India
- Died: 2 July 1995 (aged 65) London, UK
- Spouse: Smt. G Pramila Ram Reddy
- Profession: Political Scientist Academic

G. Ram Reddy (December 4, 1929 – July 2, 1995) was an Indian professor and a renowned architect of Distance Education, and considered as the father of open learning in India.
