= K. H. Hussain =

Indian type designer

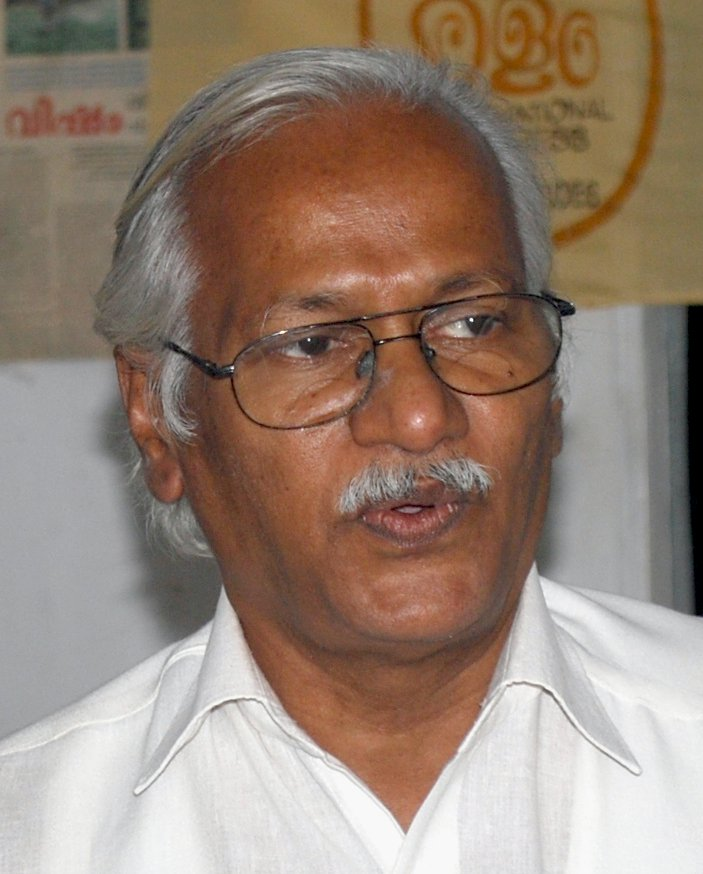
- Born: 1952 (age 73–74); Kodungallur, Thrissur district, Kerala
- Known for: Malayalm fonts

K. H. Hussain is a computing expert and typeface designer from Kerala, India. In the early days of the Malayalam computing, he came into the field of Malayalam computing by creating his own Malayalam font and text editor. He received Dr. Pradeepan Pampirikunnu Memorial Mathrubhasha (Mother Tongue) Award instituted by Sree Sankaracharya University of Sanskrit, Kalady, and Government of Kerala e-Governance Award.

Hussain's major contributions include eleven fonts including Rachana, Meera, Keraliyam, Tamil Inime, Dyuthi, Uroob and Panmana, the preservation of millions of pages in five digital archives, and the Arabic Malayalam keyboard. He was also responsible for setting up the first computer based information system in Malayalam.

== Biography ==
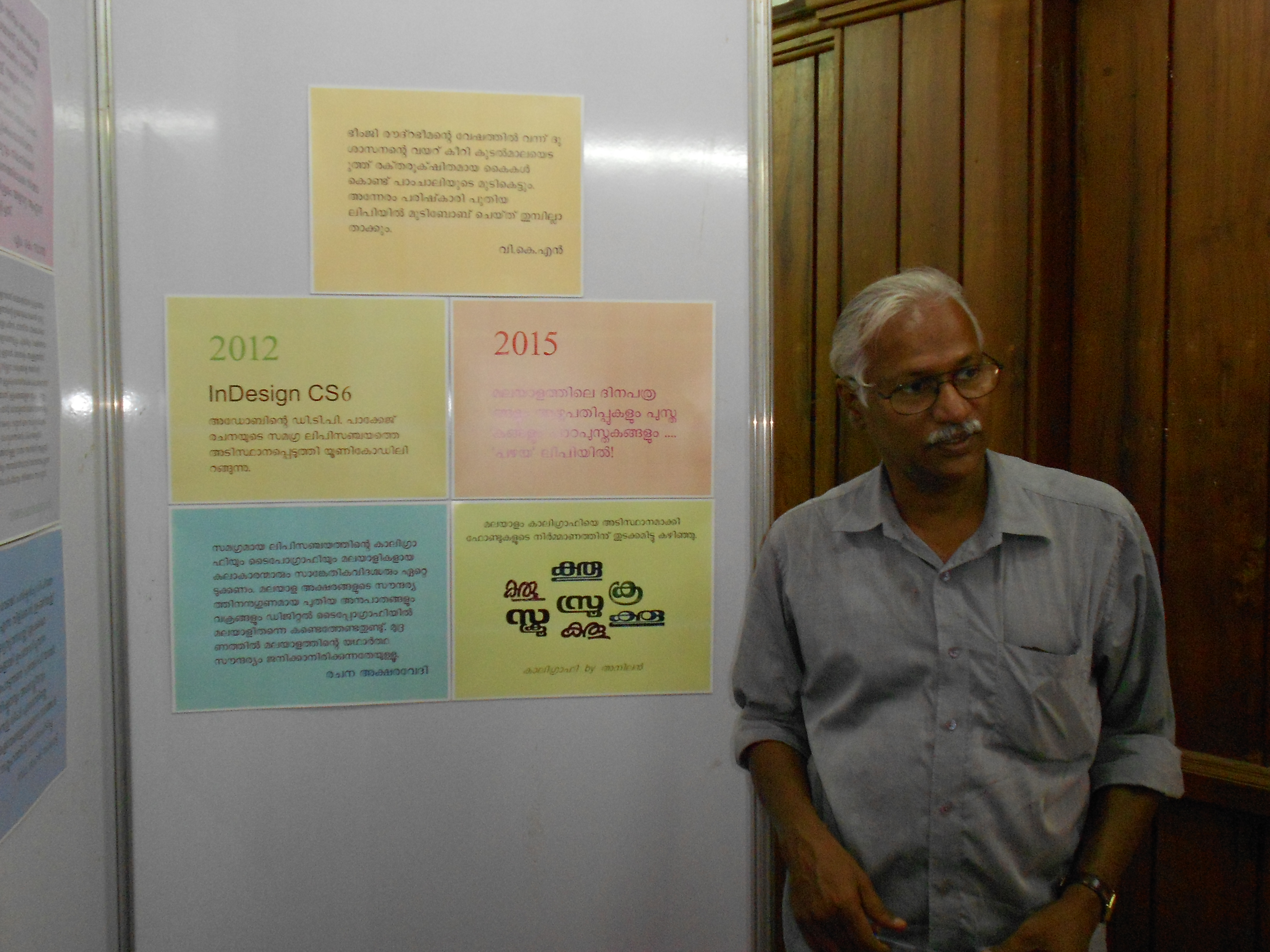
K.H. Hussain

K. H. Hussain was born in 1952 in Eriyad near Kodungallur in Thrissur district of Kerala. He graduated from UC College, Aluva in 1978 with a degree in mathematics. After that he done his master's degree in Information Science from Indira Gandhi National Open University.

Attracted towards the Naxalite movement in Kerala, Hussain was jailed for 20 months for working against the Emergency in India. T. N. Joey was his political mentor. After the Emergency, he worked as a teacher at a tuition center in Kunnamkulam for some time. After graduating in Library Science from the University of Kerala in 1980, he worked as a Librarian in the Kerala Forest Research Institute in 1981. While working as librarian, he entered the field of Information technology and font design. He later joined as scientist in Kerala Forest Research Institute, and retired from the same.

In 1999, Hussain joined the Rachana Aksharavedi, a voluntary organization working for Malayalam computing. He entered the Malayalam computing field with R. Chithrajakumar and his team, composing a Malayalam unique font called Rachana, and a Malayalam language text editor. Hussain became part of the Rachana due to his knowledge of computers. The Unicode font released in 2006 was widely circulated under the leadership of Swathanthra Malayalam Computing. first published book in Rachana font was Guru Nithya Chaitanya Yati's Thumpoo Muthal Suryan Vare.

Hussain has worked with the Sayahna Foundation, aimed at preserving classic Malayalam books, founded in 2015 by C. V. Radhakrishnan. During 2014-15 he received a grant from India Foundation for the Arts to document and analyze cultural, aesthetic, and technological paradigms along with political debates regarding the standardization and modernization of the Malayalam script.

== Contributions ==
Hussain's major contributions include Malayalam fonts including Rachana, Meera, Keraliyam, Tamil Inime, Dyuthi, Uroob and Panmana, the preservation of millions of pages in five digital archives, and the Arabic Malayalam keyboard. He was also responsible for setting up the first computer based information system in Malayalam. He also developed a naming convention for the characters, making programming and writing shaping rules easier.

The font Uroob designed by him is named after Malayalam writer Uroob. In 2015, with the financial support of International Centre for Open Source Software, an autonomous organisation under Government of Kerala, the font was re-designed, and released as a tribute to the 60th anniversary of Uroob's noted novel Ummachu.

In memory of actor Bahadoor, on the 25th anniversary of his death, a new font named Bahadoor, prepared by Hussain was released in May 2025. The Bahadoor font is based on a commemorative book released in 1978 as a continuation of the reception given to Bahadur in his birthplace. The cover of the commemorative book was designed by artist Namboothiri. Husain designed the font based on the letters drawn by Namboothiri on the cover page. The commemorative stamp released on Bahadoor's 25th death anniversary is printed in this font.

== Awards and honours ==
- 2018: Dr. Pradeepan Pampirikunnu Memorial Mathrubhasha (Mother Tongue) Award instituted by Sree Sankaracharya University of Sanskrit, Kalady, for his contributions to the Malayalam language.
- 2010: Government of Kerala e-Governance Award
