= V. C. Kulandaiswamy =

Indian academic and author

V C Kulandaiswamy
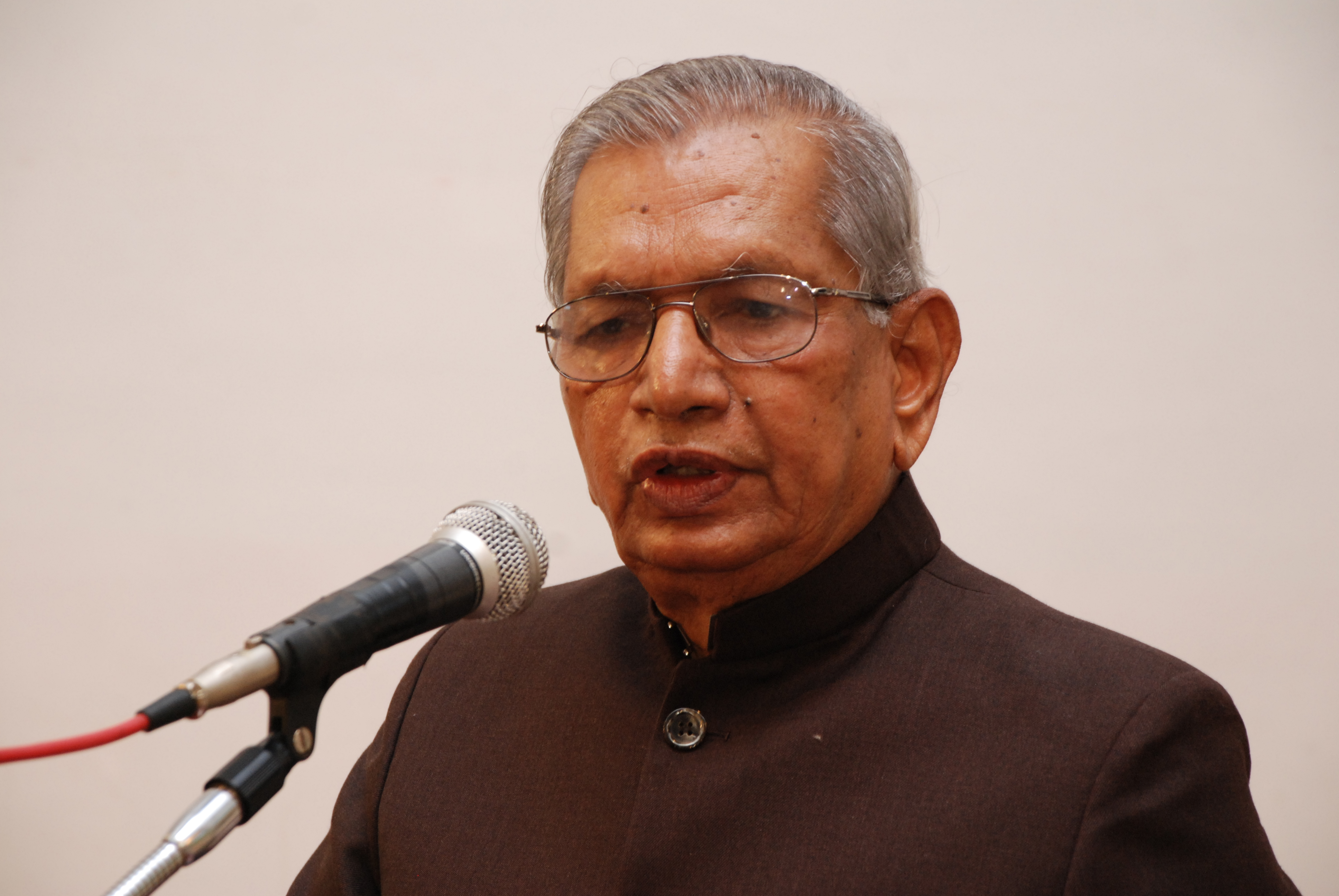

1st Vice Chancellor of the Tamil Virtual University
- In office 2001–2016

Vice Chancellor of the Anna University
- In office 1981–1990

2nd Vice Chancellor Indira Gandhi National Open University
- In office 1990–1994
- Preceded by: G. Ram Reddy
- Succeeded by: Ram G Takwale

Vice Chairman Institute of Asian Studies

Personal details
- Born: 14 July 1929 Vangalampalayam, Trichinopoly District, Madras Presidency, British India (now Karur district, Tamil Nadu, India)
- Died: 10 December 2016 (aged 87) Chennai, Tamil Nadu, India
- Spouse: K. Soundaravalli
- Profession: Academician
- Awards: Sahitya Akademi Award (1988)

V C Kulandaiswamy (14 July 1929 – 10 December 2016) was an Indian academic and author. He completed his Bachelor of engineering in Civil at Government College of Technology, Coimbatore. He obtained his Master of Technology degree from IIT Kharagpur and obtained a PhD in hydrology and water resources from the University of Illinois at Urbana-Champaign (United States).

In his early years, he was in contact with "Periyar" E. V. Ramasamy and some other personalities from the Dravidar Kazhagam (DK).

Kulandaiswamy created an eponymous mathematical model for the rainfall-runoff relationship based on a general equation developed by him. Kulandaiswamy was a member of the UNESCO planning group (1978) for the preparation of the second six-year plan (1981–86) of the International Hydraulic Programme (IHP). He has authored more than 60 research reports and papers in the field of hydrology.

He has authored six volumes of poems and seven of prose essays which earned him the Thiruvalluvar Award by Tamil Nadu government in 1999. He has received the Padma Bhushan (2002) and Padma Shri (1992), awarded by the president of India.

He worked for reform of Tamil script to make learning Tamil easier. He won the Sahitya Akademi Award (1988) for his book Vaazhum Valluvam.

He died on 10 December 2016 after a short illness.

== See also ==
- List of Sahitya Akademi Award winners for Tamil
- List of Indian writers
- List of Tamil-language writers
