= Barun Mazumder =

Indian journalist (1942–2019)

- Born: 9 September 1942
- Died: 14 October 2019 (aged 77)
- Education: Kolkata University
- Occupations: Journalist, news reader, writer, teacher

Barun Mazumder (9 September 1942 – 14 October 2019) was an Indian journalist, news reader, writer and teacher. He received Padma Shri from the Government of India for his contribution in literature and education.

== Biography ==
Mazumder was born 9 September 1942. He received post graduate degree in Journalism from Kolkata University in 1965.

Mazumder worked in Dainik Basumati for ten years. He was a war correspondent in Bangladesh during the Bangladesh Liberation War. Besides, he also worked in Akashbani Kolkata as a journalist and news reader.

Mazumder was also involved in teaching and writing. He wrote more than fifty books. He was a teacher of Baje Shibpur B. K. Paul's Institution. Besides, he was a lecturer of Indira Gandhi National Open University and Midnapore College. He was awarded Padma Shri in 2011 for his contribution in literature and education.

Mazumder died on 14 October 2019.

== Awards ==
He received Padma Shri for his contribution in literature and education from the Government of India.
