= Vineet Verma =

Indian film director, screenwriter and animator

Vineet Verma (born 25 November 1982 in Aurangabad, State of Maharashtra, India) is an Indian film director, screenwriter, producer, editor, 2D and 3D animator, and storyboard artist.

== Biography ==
Verma comes from a family of artists. His grandfather Bhagwan Das Varma was a writer and his mother Vijaya Verma a classical singer. His father N.K. Verma owns a printing business in New Delhi.

Verma began working in animation right after graduating from high school. Over a period of 10 years, he worked as an animator at Escotoonz Entertainment, Telemission Production, UTV Software Communications, and Crest Animation Studios, while earning a bachelor's degree in information technology from the Indira Gandhi National Open University in India. He also earned a Higher National Diploma in computing from Edexcel, London. He began his career as a 2D (Classical and Flash) animator and gradually moved to 3D (Maya and Max) animation and later to live action filmmaking. He was one of the senior animators of the series WordWorld, which is broadcast on PBS Kids and won a 2009 Daytime Emmy for Outstanding Children's Animated Program. In 2008, Verma moved to New York City, where he completed a 1-year intensive filmmaking program at New York Film Academy. He has since written, produced and directed a number of short films. His film Colors, an official selection of the Big Apple Film Festival 2010, was screened at Tribeca Cinemas. Verma was a judge at the 15th annual Derek Freese High School Film and Video Festival 2010 for the Best Animation/Experimental Film category.

== Filmography ==
Film	Production	Role
Just Like Us	Golden Aura Productions	Writer/ Director
Colors	Golden Aura Productions	Writer/ Director
In Search Of	Golden Aura Productions	Writer/ Director
Bad Day	JMJB Films	Director/Editor
April Fool	PrimalLinks	Creative Director
The Beginning to Get Bald	Independent	Producer
Alpha and Omega	Lionsgate / Crest Animation Productions	Animator/ Layout Artist
Christmas Dinosaur	PorchLight Entertainment	Senior 2D Animator
Faireez	Funbag Animation Studios [ca]	Senior 2D Animator
WordWorld (PBS KIDS)	Crest Animation Studios / WTTW National Productions	Senior Animator
Freej	UTV Software Communications (Dubai)	Senior Animator
Monster Buster Club	Marathon Production	Senior Animator
Jay Jay the Jet Plane	PorchLight Entertainment	Senior Animator
Jungle Book	BKN International AG	Senior Animator
Robin Hood	BKN International AG	Senior Animator
Christmas Carol	BKN International AG	Senior Animator
Kong: The Animated Series	BKN International AG	Senior Animator
Alice in the Wonderland	BKN International AG	Senior Animator
The King	Funbag Animation Studios [ca]	2D animator
Cyber Dodo	UNICEF	2D animator
