= Federation of Indian Photography =

Federation of Indian Photography (FIP) is the Indian national body of the Fédération Internationale de l'Art Photographique (En: The International Federation of Photographic Art). The present liaison officer is Barun Sinha, Patna.
