= Ram G. Takwale =

Indian academic administrator (1933–2023)

- राम ताकवले

Third vice chancellor of the Indira Gandhi National Open University
- In office 1995–1998
- Preceded by: V C Kulandaiswamy
- Succeeded by: A W Khan

First vice chancellor of the Yashwantrao Chavan Maharashtra Open University
- In office 1989–1994

Chairman of the National Assessment & Accreditation Council

Personal details
- Born: 11 April 1933
- Died: 13 May 2023 (aged 90)
- Profession: Academic

Ram G. Takwale (11 April 1933 – 13 May 2023) was an Indian academic administrator who was the vice chancellor of the University of Pune from 1978 to 1984, a vice chancellor of the Indira Gandhi National Open University and chairman of National Assessment and Accreditation Council.

Takwale was born on 11 April 1933. He died on 13 May 2023, at the age of 90.
