= Osthatheos Issac =

Syriac bishop (born 1976)

His Grace Mor Mor Osthatheos Issac Metropolitan of Bangalore, Mylapore Diocese, Patriarchal Vicar of UK.
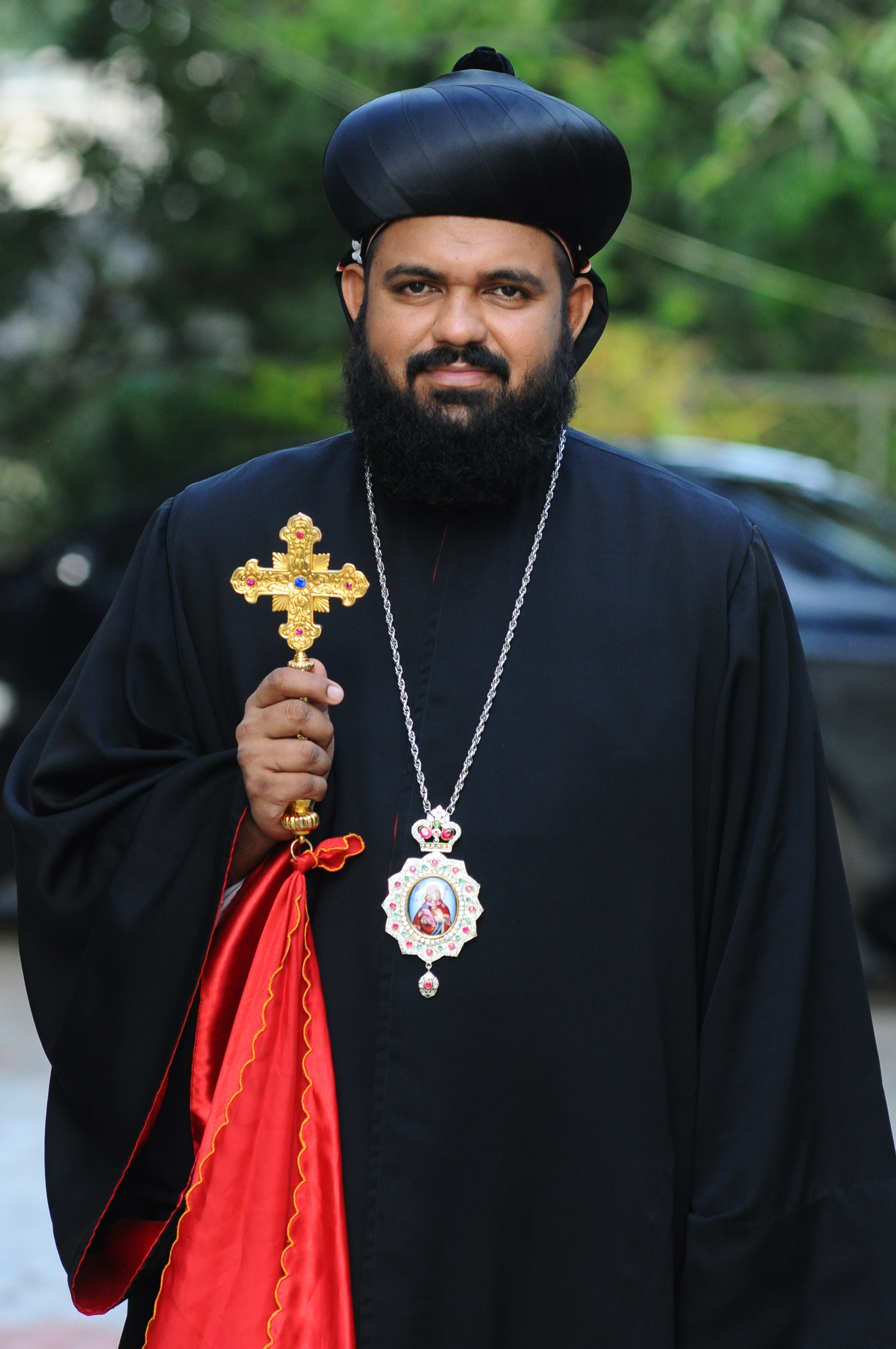
- Church: Syrian Orthodox Church
- Diocese: Bangalore, Mylapore Diocese in Tamil Nadu, Patriarchal Vicar of U.K.
- See: Holy Apostolic See of Antioch & All East

Orders
- Ordination: 12 November 2006 (Kassisso) by Mor Ignatius Zakka I Patriarch
- Consecration: 4 January 2010 by Mor Baselios Thomas I Catholicos
- Rank: Metropolitan

Personal details
- Born: 17 January 1976 (age 50) Kottayam, Kerala, India
- Education: B.A Economics from St. Alberts College, Ernakulam; M.A Kerala University; Library science from Indira Gandhi National Open University
- Alma mater: University of Kerala, Indira Gandhi National Open University

Mor Osthatheos Issac (born 17 January 1976) is a Syriac Orthodox bishop, currently Metropolitan of Bangalore, Mylapore Diocese in Tamil Nadu and Patriarchal Vicar of U.K

== Education ==
Issac completed primary and secondary school education from Georgian Academy English Medium School, Thiruvankulam and high school from Rajarshi Memorial Higher Secondary School, Vadavucode. He attained graduation in Economics from St. Albert's College and Post-graduation from Kerala University. He also graduated in Library Science from Indira Gandhi National Open University, New Delhi.
