= Manoj Pande (civil servant) =

Member Staff of Railway Board
- Incumbent
- Assumed office 2 November 2019

Director General (Personnel) of Railway Board
- In office December 2018 – December 2019

Personal details
- Citizenship: Indian
- Education: BA.LLB, MA, MBA
- Alma mater: Delhi School of Economics (1981); Indira Gandhi National Open University (1997)
- Occupation: civil servant

Manoj Pande is an Indian civil servant serving as the current Member (Staff) of the Indian Railways Board since 2019. Manoj Pande is a 1989 Batch Indian Railway Personnel Service (IRPS) officer. Prior to Member (Staff) of the Indian Railways Board he served as Director General (Personnel) of Railway Board.

== Education ==
Manoj Pande did his bachelor's degree in Economics from Kirori Mal College, University of Delhi, and law from the Rani Durgavati Vishwavidyalaya. He completed his master's degree in Economics from Delhi School of Economics and also hold an MBA degree from Human Resource Management from Indira Gandhi National Open University. He also holds a diploma in Russian language Jawaharlal Nehru University.
