= Chethana Ketagoda =

Sri Lankan television actress, voice artist, YouTuber and singer

Chethana Ketagoda චේතනා කැටගොඩ
- Born: Ketagodage Dona Ranmini Chethana Ketagoda; 4 August 1992 (age 33); Colombo, Sri Lanka
- Education: Visakha Vidyalaya
- Occupations: Actress; YouTuber; Voice Artist; Singer; Digital content creator
- Years active: 2003–present
- Parents: Upali Chandrathilake (father); Indika P. Chandrathilake (mother)

Ketagodage Dona Ranmini Chethana Ketagoda (born 4 August 1992, Sinhala: චේතනා කැටගොඩ), popularly known as Chethana Ketagoda, is an actress in Sri Lankan television as well as a voice artist. One of the most popular voice artists in Sri Lanka with a career spanning 18 years, she rendered her voice to several popular international soap operas and serials. Apart from that, she is also a singer, investor, agriculturalist, digital content creator on social media platforms as well as an Attorney-at-Law by profession.

== Personal life ==
She was born on 4 August 1992 in Colombo as the second child of the family. Her father K. D. Upali Chandrathilake, is a retired Air Vice Marshall of Sri Lanka Air Force. Her mother, Indika P. Chandrathilake, is an Attorney-at-Law and a government official. She completed education from Visakha Vidyalaya, Colombo up to grade 9 and then completed O/Ls from Royal Institute International School, Havelock. In the 2009 Edexcel IGCSE examination at Royal Institute, she became the “World’s Best” in Sinhala.

After studies, she completed LLB degree in University of London and became an Attorney-at-Law. Besides, she also completed her BA degree in Hindi Language from Indira Gandhi National Open University, India. Currently, she is working as a lecturer in Hindi Language.

== Career ==
At very young age, she joined with Sri Lanka Rupavahini Corporation and started appearing on several child programs. In 2003, she became a voice artist under the guidance of popular actress Mercy Edirisinghe. She made her maiden dubbing for the cartoon Kaabaasiniya Thuma under Athula Ransirilal. Meanwhile, in 2008, she started singing career.

At the same time, she started to act in few stage dramas at Tower Hall Foundation. In 2008, she made her first television role in the serial Madam Shobha directed and produced by Jayasekara Aponso. Meanwhile, she rendered her voice to several popular international soap operas and serials including; Sooriya Diyani, Mayawarunge Lokaya, Swapna, Praveena, Me Adarayai, Prema Dadayama and Boys Over Flowers. In 2010, she made the music in the film Behind the Scenes directed by Lakpathy Wijesekara.

In 2020, she appeared in the television serial Bro directed by Dilan Wickramakeerthi and produced by Gayan Dinesh Perera. In the serial, she played the character 'Bilesha'. In 2021, she made her third television role 'Dinu' in the television serial Snap directed by Pasindu Perera and Produced by Ameesha Kavindi.

=== Selected radio dramas ===
- Araliya Man Aadarei (2009)
- Aadarei Man Samanalee (2013)
- Sihina Sittarawi (2018)
- Maharaja Gamunu (2018)
- Kemmura Adaviya (2019)
- Apoorva (2020)

Songs

- Naana Vile (2025)
- Duhul Sele (2024)
- Eka Wahalak Yata (2024)
- Ran Kanda (2022)

== Dubbing works ==
Year	Dubbed Work	Original Serial	Role	Ref.
2003	Kaabaasiniya Thuma	Oscar's Orchestra	Geethika	
	Makara Mithuru	Jane and the Dragon		
2013	Mayawarunge Lokaya	Holy Pearl	Thinyao	
	Aththatu Na Eth Eya Igilei	Carnation	Ithoko	
2014	Sooriya Diyani	Empress Ki	Sanyan	
2018	Praveena	Kasautii Zindagii Kay	Nadeesha Balaji	
2014	Swapna	Diya Aur Baati Hum	Emily Rathi	
2014	Me Adarayai	Yeh Hai Mohabbatein	Ishitha Bhalha/Sarika Bhalha	
2018	Digvijaya	Porus	Princess Barsine	
2018	Prema Dadayama	Naagin 3	Vishakha Khanna	
	Thatu Ahimi Samanalee	My Girl	Joo Yoo-rin	
2016	Boys Over Flowers	Boys Over Flowers	Ha Jae Kyon	
2017	Melody of Love	Melody of Love	Suimi	
2018	Obath Mamath Ayath	Beyhadh	Maya Malhotra	
2018	Muthu Ahura	Kırgın Çiçekler	Oslum	
2017	Kinduru Kumariyo	H_{2}O: Just Add Water	Avi	
2018	Panditha Rama	Tenali Rama		
2021	Avengers	Avengers Assemble	Black Widow	
2021	Hotel Transylvania	Hotel Transylvania	Mavis Dracula-Loughran	

== Television serials ==
Year	Film	Role	Ref.
2008	Madam Shobha		
2020	Bro	Bilesha	
2021	Snap	Dinu	
