= Distant Education Bureau =

Bureau of the University Grants Commission (India)

Distance Education Bureau
- Abbreviation: DEB
- Formation: 2013; 13 years ago
- Headquarters: New Delhi
- Leader: Joint Secretary
- Main organ: Bureau
- Parent organization: University Grants Commission
- Website: deb.ugc.ac.in

The Distance Education Bureau (DEB) is a bureau of the UGC based in New Delhi, India, in charge of regulating distance education in India. It was established in 2012, replacing the DEAC, an organisation that was responsible for open learning and distance education since 1985.

== History ==
Distance education in India started in 1962 with a pilot project correspondence courses, which led to the birth of University of Delhi's School of Correspondence Courses and Continuing Education (now DU-SOL). The success of the project led to introduction of correspondence course institutes (later renamed as directorates or centres of distance education) in more universities. In 1982 Dr. B.R. Ambedkar Open University was established, the first open university in India. This was followed by the establishment of Indira Gandhi National Open University at the national level in 1985. Although the statutory authority for regulating higher education in India is the University Grants Commission (UGC), the responsibility for promotion and coordination of open and distance learning (ODL) was bestowed on IGNOU under the Indira Gandhi National Open University Act (1985). The Distance Education Council (DEC) was set up by IGNOU in 1991 and became operational in 1992. with the Vice Chancellor of IGNOU acting as the ex officio chairperson of DEC.

In August 2010, the Ministry of Human Resource Development (MHRD) constituted a committee for investigating distance education standards in India. The committee recommended the creation of a new regulatory body, the Distance Education Council of India (DECI). It also recommended that until such body is established, the DEC may be shifted to UGC. On 29 December 2012, the MHRD published an Order transferring the regulatory authority of distance education from IGNOU to UGC. In May 2013 IGNOU dissolved the DEC and the UGC took over the entire assets and manpower, establishing the Distance Education Bureau.
