= Shiv Kumar Rai =

Indian journalist-turned-entrepreneur

Dr Shiv Kumar Rai is an Indian journalist-turned-entrepreneur, who is the founder of FOURTH VOICE MEDIA NETWORK and Editor-in- Chief of POINT OUT magazine. Dr Rai, is an eminent author and columnist with experience in media houses. He is a winner of the Bhartendu Harishchandra Award2010 for his book, 'Meri Jaati Bhartiya', conferred by the Ministry of Information & Broadcasting, Government of India.

Dr Rai regularly writes commentaries on issues of interest in publications. He had a beginning in the print media, where he worked for 'Nava Bharat' and 'Dainik Jagran'. He then switched over to take on the challenge of electronic media and worked with 'Zee News' by anchoring news shows, and went on to work with news channels like 'Aaj Tak' and 'Doordarshan'. Besides anchoring, Dr Rai has also produced a variety of current affairs programmes for various television news channels.

== Education ==
Rai has a Master of Arts degree in Social Science.

Doctor of Philosophy awarded by Barkatullah University, Bhopal for research on the subject 'Suicide in Bhopal City: A sociological study'. This study was first of its kind in Madhya Pradesh.

Associated with Indian Institute of Advance Studies, Shimla for research on Suicide.

Research on occupational mobility among slum dwellers of Bhopal, Madhya Pradesh.

Presented paper in 22nd All India Sociological Conference in the year 1995.

== Career ==
Rai started his career as a reporter on a regional newspaper based in Madhya Pradesh.

He was a prime time News Anchor with Zee News. Rai also worked with Doordarshan, Voice of India, Aaj Tak, and the Navabharat.

As of 2014, he is a columnist for Dainik Jagran, Swatantra Vartha, Amar Ujala, as well as for other Indian newspapers.

== Fourth Voice Media Network ==
In 2011 Rai established FOURTH VOICE MEDIA NETWORK (POINT OUT GROUP), an Indian Media Company based in New Delhi, in the PRINT MEDIA, FILM & TELEVISION PROGRAMME.

== Personal life ==
Rai is based in New Delhi, India. He lives with his family.

== Publications ==
- Meri Jati Bharatiya — winner of the Bhartendu Harishchandra Award conferred by the Ministry of Information and Broadcasting.
