= Central Hindi Directorate =

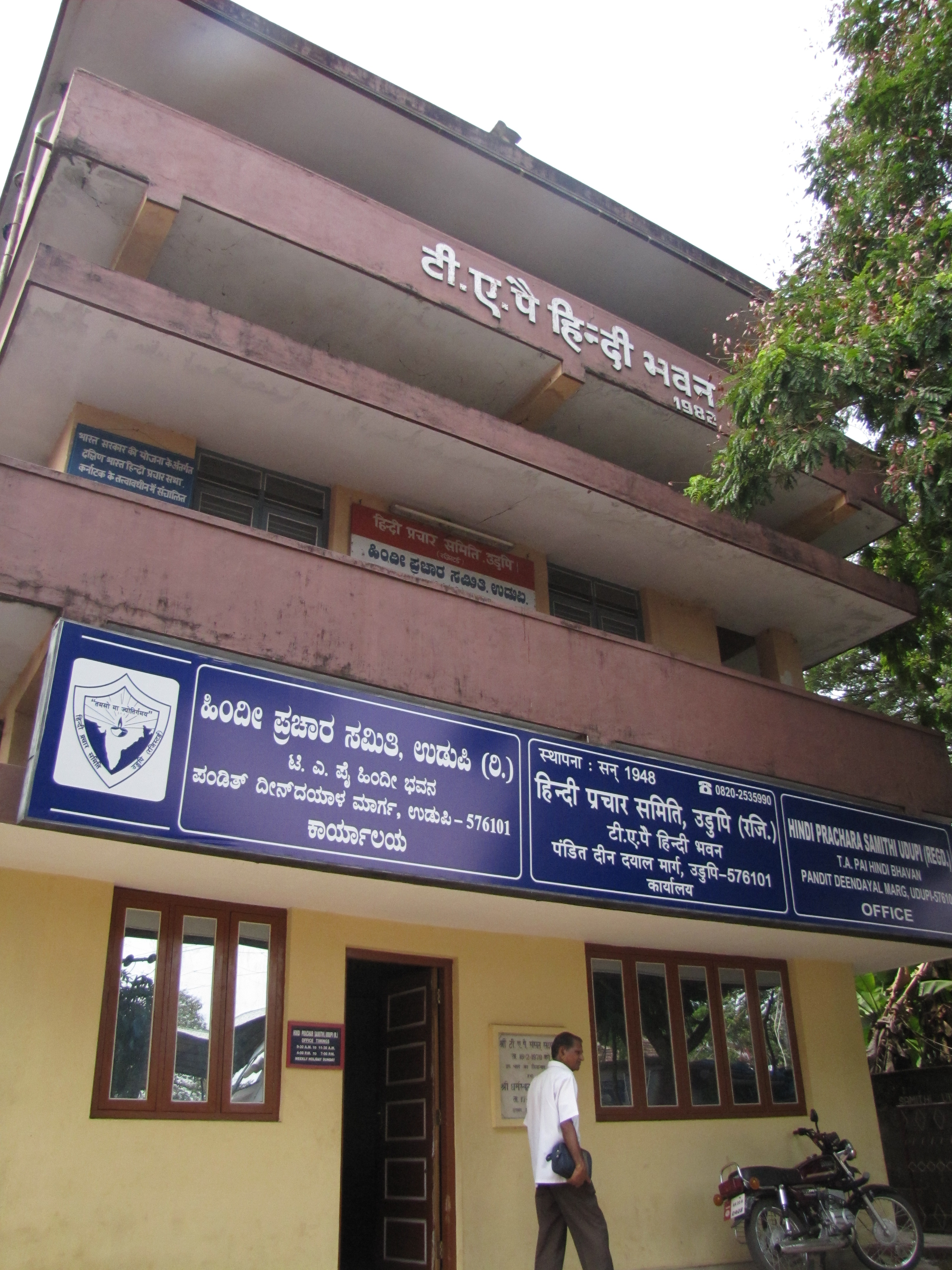
- A branch of the Hindi Prachar Samithi, a Hindi learning school administered by the Central Hindi Directorate, in Udupi.
- Formation: 1 March 1960; 66 years ago
- Type: Governmental organisation
- Headquarters: New Delhi
- Parent organisation: Ministry of Education
- Website: English; Hindi

The Central Hindi Directorate (Hindi: केन्द्रीय हिन्दी निदेशालय, romanized: Kendrīya Hindī Nideśālay), New Delhi is the directorate, under the Ministry of Education (India), responsible for promotion of Standard Hindi. It also regulates the use of Devanagari script and Hindi spelling in India. In keeping with the instructions of Article 351 of the Constitution of India, the Central Hindi Directorate of 1 March 1960 was established. There are four regional offices situated at Chennai, Hyderabad, Guwahati and Kolkata.

== See also ==
- Grammar of Modern Standard Hindi
- Vemuri Anjaneya Sarma
