= Fédération Internationale de l'Art Photographique =

Organization of national photography associations

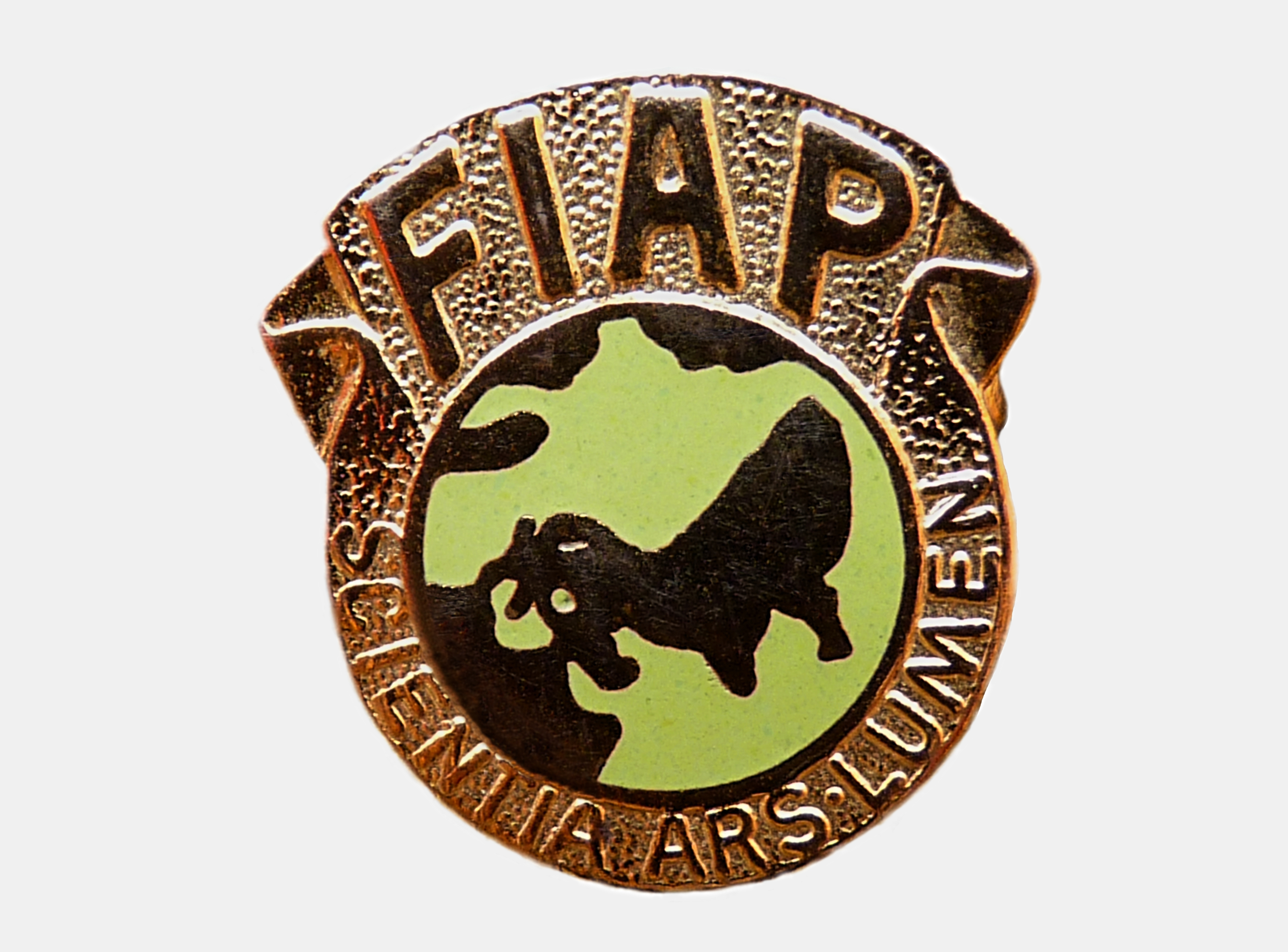
- FIAP Badge
- Abbreviation: FIAP
- Formation: 1946
- Type: Non-profit organization
- Headquarters: Luxembourg
- Region served: Worldwide
- Website: www.fiap.net

Fédération Internationale de l'Art Photographique, or FIAP (Eng. The International Federation of Photographic Art), is an international organization of national associations of photography. As of 2021 91 national associations are members, comprising over one million individual photographers.

FIAP was founded by M. Van de Wijer of Belgium in 1946, who remained its president until 1976. French is the first official language of FIAP, with official texts translated in English and German.

The first members were the photographic associations from Belgium, the Netherlands, Italy, Portugal and Switzerland. In 1947, Denmark, Finland and Hungary joined. In 1948 Mr Wijer offered an Honorary Presidency of the organisation to the Royal Photographic Society which it declined pending further information about the still new organisation. The first FIAP congress took place in Bern, Switzerland in 1950, at which time additional national association members included Austria, Brazil, Cuba, Spain, Finland, France, Ireland, Luxembourg, Sweden, and Yugoslavia.

== Distinctions ==
The FIAP gives several distinctions to its members, based on their achievements in national and international photo contests under patronage of FIAP.

Distinction	Abbreviation
Artist FIAP	AFIAP
Excellence FIAP	EFIAP
Excellence FIAP Bronze	EFIAP/b
Excellence FIAP Silver	EFIAP/s
Excellence FIAP Gold	EFIAP/g
Excellence FIAP Platinum	EFIAP/p
Excellence FIAP Diamond 1	EFIAP/d1
Excellence FIAP Diamond 2	EFIAP/d2
Excellence FIAP Diamond 3	EFIAP/d3
Master FIAP	MFIAP

As of 2021 there were 256 photographers, awarded the honorary title Master of Photography (MFIAP).

== Biennials ==
FIAP biennials are organized every two years in a different member country. In even years Black and White and Nature Biennials take place, in odd years Colour Biennials, from time to time there are also Youth Biennials. The latest biennials:

- 26th FIAP Color Biennial, United Kingdom, 2015
- 33rd FIAP Black and White Biennial, South Korea, 2015
- 18th FIAP Nature Biennial, Serbia, 2016
- 27th FIAP Colour Biennial, Norway, 2017
- 39th FIAP Youth Biennial, Bulgaria, 2018
- 19th FIAP Nature Biennial, Oman, 2018
- 34th FIAP Black & White Biennial, South Africa, 2018
- 28th FIAP Colour Biennial, Spain, 2019
- 20th FIAP Nature Biennial, Russia, 2020
- 29th FIAP Colour Biennial, Château de Forezan, Cognin, France, 2021
