= List of largest meat companies in Germany =

The list of the largest companies in the meat industry in Germany shows the 20 largest companies of the meat industry in Germany. The list comprises companies that are active in slaughtering pigs, cattle and poultry as well as in meat import, meat processing, meat packing and the production of meat products such as sausages.

== List (2021) ==
The following sorts the 20 largest meat companies in Germany by their revenue in Euro in the year 2021.

Rank	Company name	Headquarters	Revenue in million €	Employees	Business area
1	Tönnies	Rheda-Wiedenbrück, Nordrhein-Westfalen	6.200	15.200	Slaugthering of particularly pigs and cattle, and processing
2	PHW Group	Rechterfeld, Niedersachsen	2.769	8.900	Slaugthering of poultry and processing
3	Westfleisch	Münster, Nordrhein-Westfalen	2.600	7.500	Slaugthering of particularly pigs and cattle, and processing
4	Vion Food Germany	Boxtel, Netherlands	2.500	6.200	Slaugthering of particularly pigs and cattle, and processing
5	Rothkötter Group	Meppen, Niedersachsen	1.600	4.700	Slaugthering of poultry and processing
6	Heristo	Bad Rothenfelde, Niedersachsen	1.439	3.732	Processing and meat import
7	Danish Crown Germany	Randers, Denmark	1.400	3.700	Slaugthering of particularly pigs and cattle, and processing
8	Müller Group	Birkenfeld, Baden-Württemberg	950	850	Slaugthering of particularly pigs and cattle
9	Edeka Südwest Fleisch	Offenburg, Baden-Württemberg	946	1.500	Processing
10	Kaufland Fleischwaren	Heilbronn, Baden-Württemberg	849		Processing
11	InFamily Foods	Versmold, Nordrhein-Westfalen	720	2.400	Processing
12	Sprehe Group	Cappeln (Oldenburg), Niedersachsen	720	2.177	Slaugthering of poultry and processing
13	Willms	Ruppichteroth, Nordrhein-Westfalen	687	1.700	Slaugthering of particularly pigs and cattle, and processing
14	Bauerngut (Edeka Minden-Hannover)	Minden, Nordrhein-Westfalen	687	1.312	Processing
15	Brandenburg (REWE Group)	Köln, Nordrhein-Westfalen	657	3.011	Processing
16	Rasting (Edeka Rhein-Ruhr)	Meckenheim, Nordrhein-Westfalen	604	980	Processing
17	Heidemark Group	Höltinghausen, Niedersachsen	576	1.800	Slaugthering of poultry and processing
18	OSI Group	Gersthofen, Bayern	552	768	Slaugthering and processing
19	Goldschmaus Group	Garrel, Niedersachsen	550	1.968	Slaugthering of particularly pigs and cattle, and processing
20	Plukon Germany	Visbek, Niedersachsen	530	1.700	Slaugthering of poultry and processing
