= Clemens Tönnies =

German businessman

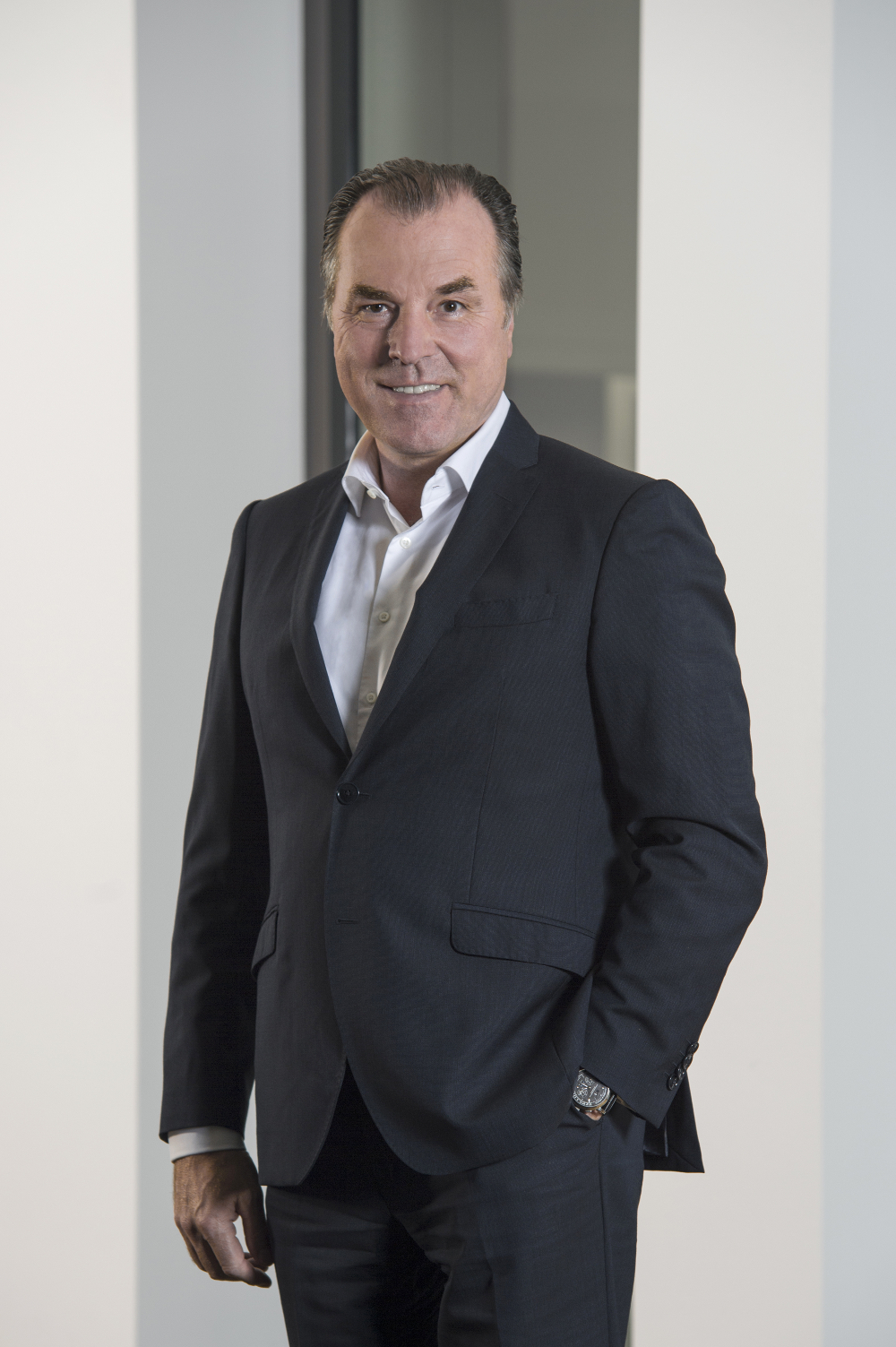
- Tönnies in 2017
- Born: 27 May 1956 (age 70); Rheda, West Germany
- Occupation: Entrepreneur
- Known for: Billionaire businessman and former chairman of professional football club FC Schalke 04

Clemens Tönnies (ˈkleːmɛns ˈtœnjəs) is a German businessperson and billionaire who owns 45% of the meat processing company Tönnies Holding. In 2022, Forbes estimated his wealth at 1.6 billion US dollars. From 2001 to 2020, he was a chairman of the supervisory board of the football club FC Schalke 04.

== Early life ==
Tönnies was born as the son of the butcher Klemens Tönnies and his wife Maria in Rheda, where he grew up with six siblings.

== Career ==
He took over the family company after his brother Bernd Tönnies died of a lung infection following a heart attack in 1994.

=== Tax investigation ===
In 2012, German tax investigators searched Tönnies' office due to suspected tax evasion.

In January 2013, the German Federal Cartel Office fined Tönnies 90,000 euros (of the maximum 100,000) because he had omitted his shares in the Zur Mühlen Group when attempting to merge his company with the slaughterhouse company Tummel. The Cartel Office cited the shares as a main reason for rejecting the merger.

Tönnies obtained public funds from the German tax administration via CumEx deals. In these deals, he obtained refunds of taxes he had never paid.

=== Price fixing ===
The Tönnies subsidiaries Böklunder, Plumrose and Karl Könecke Fleischwarenfabrik engaged in price fixing and were fined 128 million euros by the Federal Cartel Office. However, the antitrust agency was unable to obtain the fines, because Tönnies had transferred the companies' activities to the Zur Mühlen Group and then liquidated the subsidiaries due to pay fines. As a result of this, the German government closed this loophole in September 2016.

== Criticism ==
In June 2020, government-mandated mass testing for SARS-CoV-2 found that at least 1,500 of 7,000 workers at the main Tönnies plant in Rheda-Wiedenbrück were infected. On 18 June 2020, parents and children held a demonstration in front of Tönnies' house, since due to the danger of infection, schools and kindergartens had been closed.

Tönnies has sued a camera team, which led the German TV show Akte to make an episode about how he deals with critics.

== Political views ==
In August 2019, Tönnies spoke at the Tag des Handwerks Paderborn conference. He criticised the idea of raising certain taxes to fight climate change. In his talk, he suggested that Gerd Müller (CSU), at the time minister for Economic Cooperation and Development, "should finance power plants in Africa instead, and he will then send 20 large power plants to Africa every year. Then they will stop cutting down trees and they will stop producing children when it's dark, when we electrify them." This was widely criticised as racist, for instance by the German news magazine Der Spiegel.

== Football ==
Fans of FC Schalke 04 demanded that Tönnies step down from the club's board, including with a human chain of around 1,000 fans around the stadium on 27 June 2020. He resigned on 30 June 2020 with immediate effect.
