= Forthbach =

River in Germany

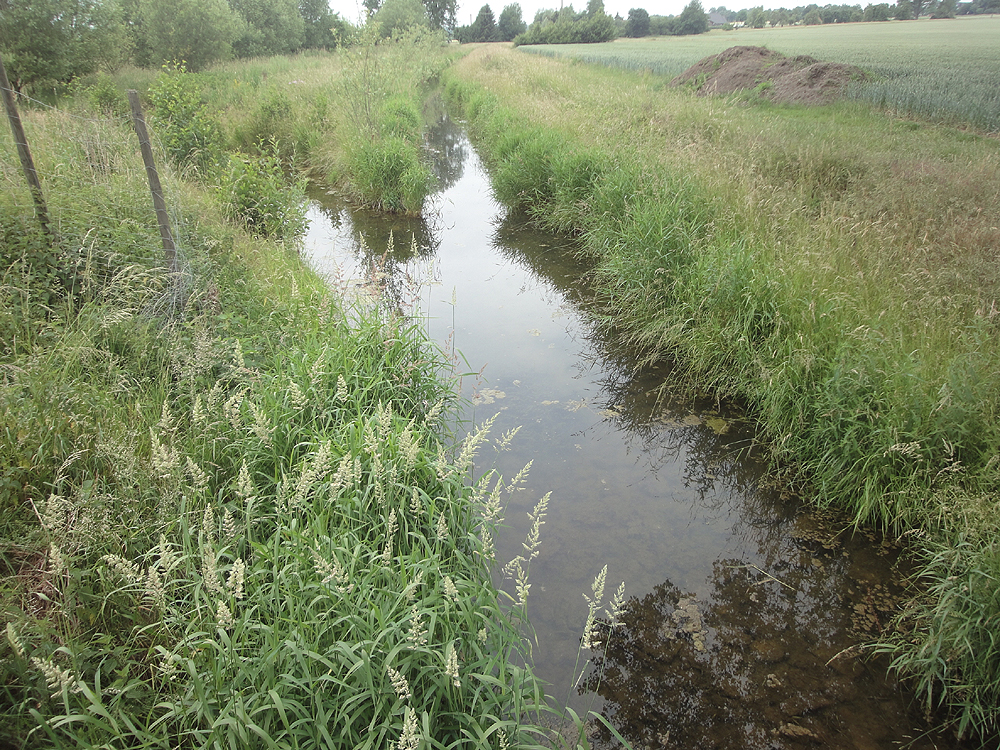

Location
- Country: Germany
- State: North Rhine-Westphalia

Physical characteristics
- Mouth
  - location: Grubebach
  - coordinates: 51.8148°N 8.3638°E
- Length: 19.5 km (12.1 mi)

Basin features
- Progression: Grubebach→ Ems→ North Sea

Forthbach is a river of North Rhine-Westphalia, Germany. It flows into the Grubebach near Rheda-Wiedenbrück.

== See also ==
- List of rivers of North Rhine-Westphalia
