= Lannertbach =

River in Germany

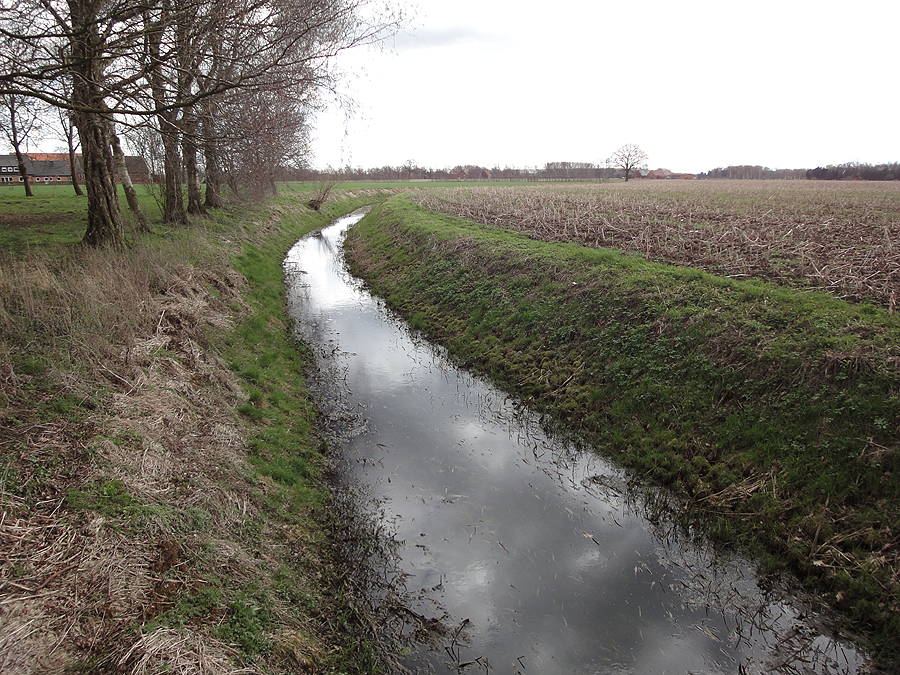

Location
- Country: Germany
- States: North Rhine-Westphalia

Physical characteristics
- Mouth
  - location: Grubebach
  - coordinates: 51.8142°N 8.3641°E

Basin features
- Progression: Grubebach→ Ems→ North Sea

Lannertbach is a small river of North Rhine-Westphalia, Germany. It is 4.8 km long and flows into the Grubebach as a right tributary near Rheda-Wiedenbrück.

== See also ==
- List of rivers of North Rhine-Westphalia
