= Tönnies Holding =

German company in the food industry

Coordinates: 51°51′48″N 8°19′20″E

Tönnies Holding ApS & Co. KG
- Type: Private
- Industry: Meat industry
- Founded: 1971; 55 years ago
- Founder: Bernd Tönnies
- Headquarters: Rheda-Wiedenbrück, Germany
- Area served: Worldwide
- Key people: Clemens Tönnies (CEO)
- Products: Pork, Beef, Sausages
- Revenue: €7.765 billion (2024)
- Owner: Clemens Tönnies (45%)
- Number of employees: 20,366 (2024)
- Website: toennies.de/en/

The Tönnies Group is a German family business in the meat industry that operates internationally. Its core business is meat processing of pork and beef. For pork, Tönnies is the German market leader. With a revenue of over €7.7 billion, the company is one of the largest meat groups in Europe.

The company is based in Brørup, Denmark, with its administrative headquarters in Rheda-Wiedenbrück in East Westphalia, Germany. Tönnies pursues an internationalization strategy with 25 foreign offices, German and international production sites. The company has faced public criticism and protests regarding its working conditions, the illegal disposal of waste, and its operations during the COVID-19 pandemic.

== History ==
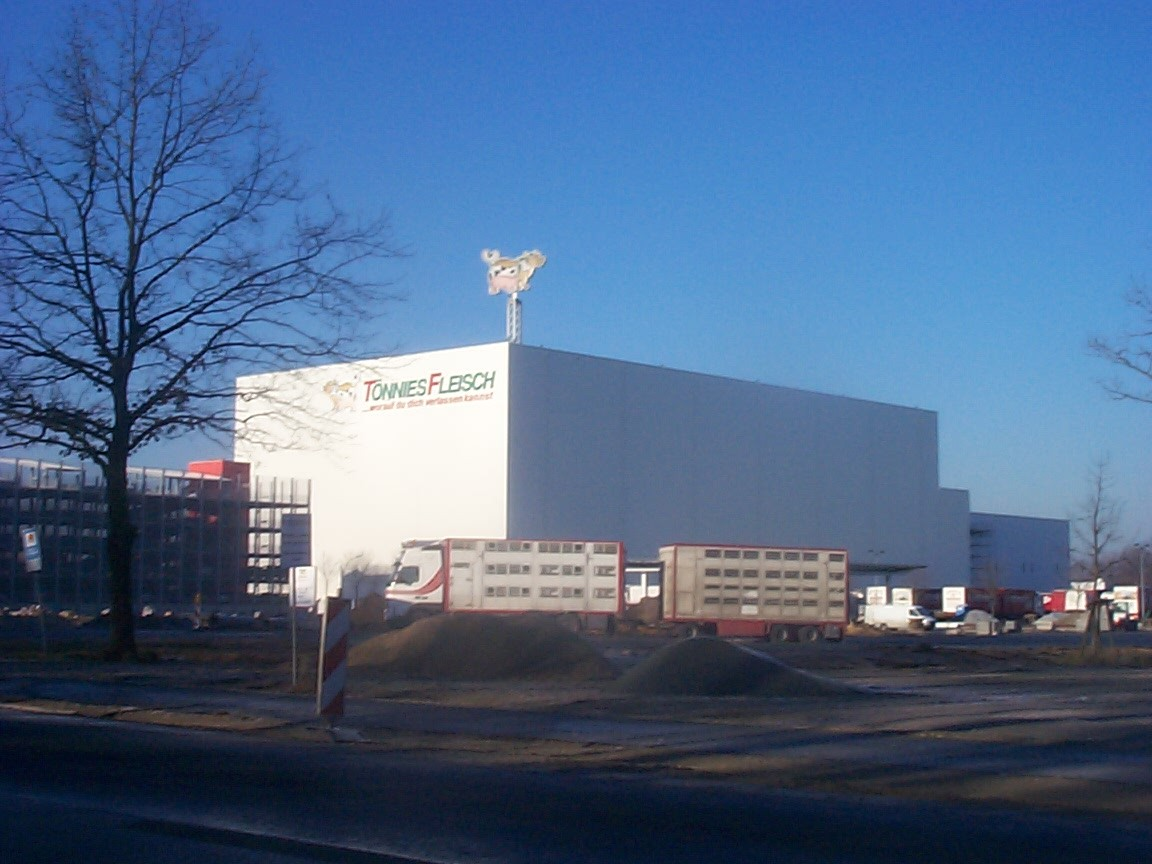
Tönnies main factory in Rheda-Wiedenbrück

The company was founded in 1971 by Bernd Tönnies, joined by his brother Clemens Tönnies a while later.

On July 1, 1994, Bernd Tönnies died. Before he died, he gave 40% of the company's shares to his brother Clemens Tönnies. After his death, his two sons Robert and Clemens junior Tönnies inherited the other 60% of the shares. In 2008, Robert and Clemens junior Tönnies both gave 5% of the share to Clemens Tönnies. In 2012, Robert Tönnies announced that he took over the 25% share of his brother, from then on owning 50% like Clemens Tönnies. Subsequently, Robert Tönnies claimed back the 5% that he gave to Clemens Tönnies, resulting in multiple legal disputes.

In 2015, Tönnies took over the Danish pork company Tican with 1,9 millionen slaughtered pigs in 2013/14.

On Wednesday, 17 June 2020, work was ramped-down at the Tönnies slaughterhouse in Rheda-Wiedenbrück due to an outbreak of COVID-19 infections originating from there. By that date, 657 employees had tested positive for the virus. That afternoon the district of Gütersloh closed all schools and children's daycare centres until summer holiday. It also closed all post offices and cancelled training for FC Gütersloh 2000 as well as an upcoming Black Lives Matter demonstration. By 20 June, the number of infections had exceeded 1,000.

== Structure ==
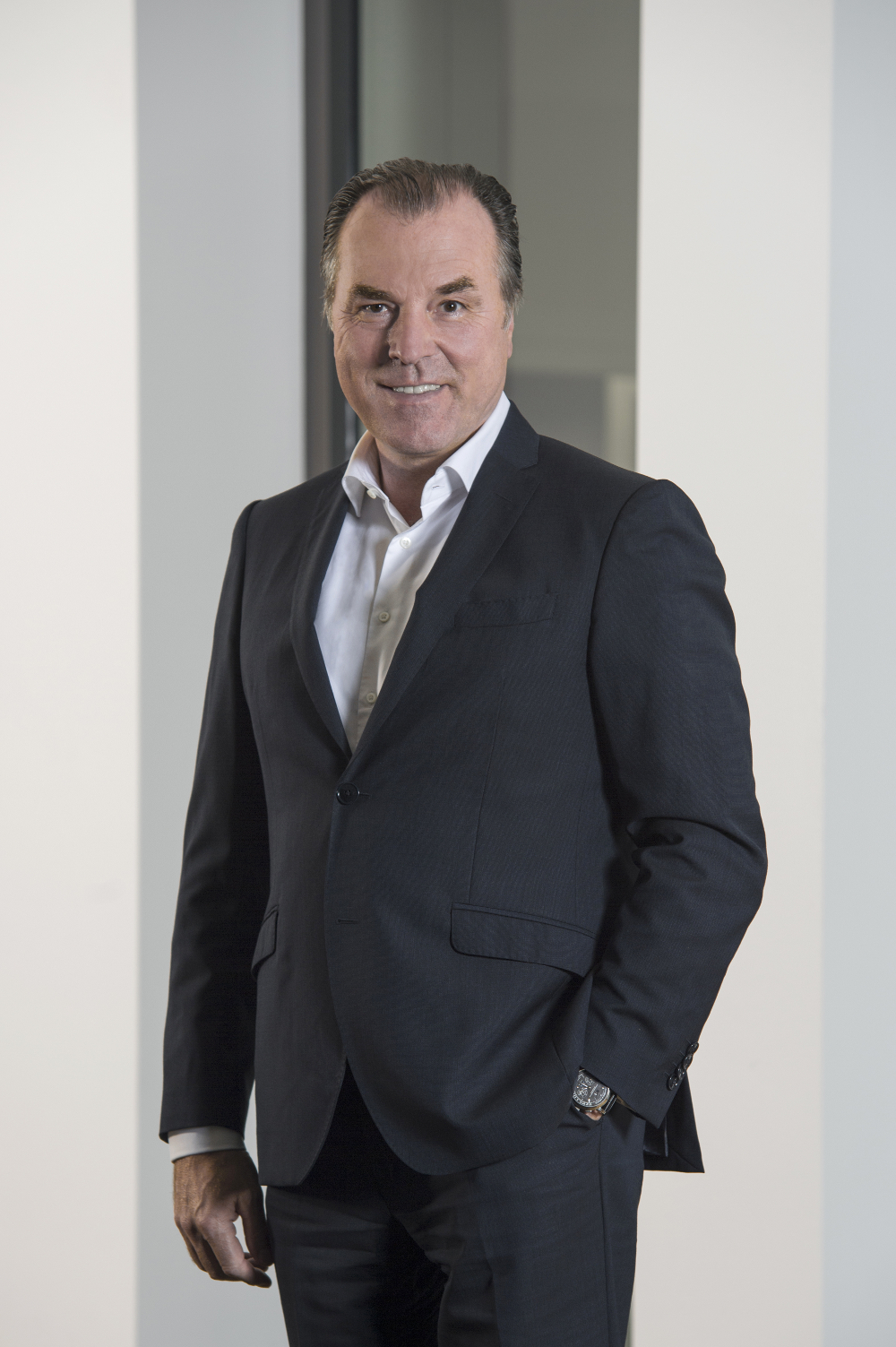
Clemens Tönnies was the chairman of the supervisory board of FC Schalke 04 from 2001 to 2020.

The company has around 20,366 employees (as of 2024) and an annual revenue of €7.765 billion (2024). The export share is about 50 percent.

Main owner and company's chairman is Clemens Tönnies with a share of 45% of the food industry giant.

The company is divided in eight business segments: pork, sausages and beef, convenience, ingredients, logistics, as well as international and central services.

In Rheda-Wiedenbrück, the company has its headquarters and operates Germanys largest pig slaughterhouse.

== Controversies ==
=== Working conditions ===
The International Union of Food, Agricultural, Hotel, Restaurant, Catering, Tobacco and Allied Workers' Associations (IUF) criticizes Tönnies for "miserable working conditions", with more than 70% of the employees at the main plant employed under temporary work contracts.

=== Illegal disposal of slaughterhouse waste ===
From 2017 to 2020, slaughterhouse waste was processed in a biogas plant in Paulushofen, although the plant did not have a permit for this. Much of the slaughterhouse waste came from a slaughterhouse in Weißenfels in Saxony-Anhalt, which belongs to the Tönnies meat group. More than 450 trips are said to have been made from there to Paulushofen.

=== Racism accusations ===
In 2019, Clemens Tönnies was temporarily suspended from his position as chairman of the supervisory board of the German soccer team FC Schalke 04 because of accusations of racist statements. On 30 June 2020, Clemens Tönnies decided to step down from his role as the chairman of Schalke's supervisory board after 19 years in service.

=== Protests against the resumption of operations during the COVID-19 pandemic ===
On July 4, 2020, the alliance Gemeinsam gegen die Tierindustrie held a rally on the factory premises to demand that the decommissioned slaughterhouse remain permanently closed. Earlier that night, activists had climbed onto the building and attached a banner with the words “Shut down animal industry”.

On July 17, 2020, around 300 participants protested against the reopening at the plant site. This was opposed by 300 farmers who welcomed the reopening of the company.

In March 2022, Tönnies was criticised for trying to recruit meat factory workers among Ukrainian refugees at the Polish-Ukrainian border.

=== Protest in Rheda-Wiedenbrück ===
On February 15, 2024, a peaceful action by the Gemeinsam gegen die Tierindustrie alliance took place on the grounds of the Tönnies headquarters in Rheda-Wiedenbrück. Activists unfurled banners with the inscriptions “Gemeinsam gegen Tönnies” (Together Against Tönnies), “Tönnies Vergesellschaften” (Socialize Tönnies) and “Neokolonialismus stoppen” (Stop Neocolonialism). The alliance announced further actions against the company.

=== Protest in Crailsheim due to the takeover of Vion by Tönnies Holding ===
In April 2025, protests took place in Crailsheim against the planned takeover of the Vion slaughterhouses by the Tönnies company. Around 80 activists from the alliance "Gemeinsam gegen die Tierindustrie" blocked the plant by gluing themselves to the site, setting themselves in concrete and even climbing onto roofs and lampposts. The police had to deploy special forces to remove the demonstrators. Operations at the slaughterhouse came to a temporary standstill.

The protest action was aimed specifically at Tönnies, which is criticized by the activists for its role in industrial meat production. The protesters fear that the takeover will lead to a further concentration of market power and have negative consequences for animal welfare. According to the activists, Tönnies is emblematic of a system that relies on factory farming, exploitation and profit orientation. The activists expressed their solidarity with the workers with a banner. To prevent the takeover, the alliance Gemeinsam gegen die Tierindustrie has also filed a complaint with the Federal Cartel Office.

The demonstration, which was peaceful according to the police, was not registered. The incident once again highlights the social controversy surrounding the business practices of the company, which has already been criticized in the past for working conditions and animal welfare.

== Sponsoring ==
The Tönnies Group has been a sponsor of the traditional Bundesliga club FC Schalke 04 for many years. Currently, the subsidiary Böklunder premium sponsor until 2024. Bernd and Clemens Tönnies were also personally involved with the soccer club for years.

Since July 2019, there has also been an advertising partnership between the Tönnies Group and Arminia Bielefeld. Due to the events surrounding the coronavirus outbreak, the sports club decided to end the partnership at the end of the season.
