= Branch house =

Branch house may refer to:

- Branch House, a historical residence in Richmond, Virginia
- Branch house (building), a meat warehouse marketplace
