= Club RTL (pay-TV) =

German pay-TV operator owned by Bertelsmann's subsidiary CLT

Club RTL was a planned German pay-TV operator owned by Bertelsmann's subsidiary CLT and would operate its service on the Astra satellite using digital compression. The service was expected to launch in autumn 1996 but never did so due to problems with the Federal Cartel Office.

== History ==
1996 led to a rush in digital satellite television in the German market. Premiere, the existing service, used analog satellite and did not intend to start digital broadcasts. This led to competition between two potential players, DF1 and Club RTL. RTL announced the new service in June. It was bound to share satellites with DF1; on the eves of launch, both parties involved in their pay-TV packages (Bertelsmann and Kirch) signed an accord to use the d-box decoders.

RTL believed that the only way to operate the service properly is by offering its package, estimated to be of "up to 10 channels", on DF1's transponders; had RTL opted to launch Club RTL separately, it would end up becoming costly. UFA president Rolf Schmidt-Holz said that the initial plan was to make it independent, but market circumstances led to the cut in plans.

On 26 July, RTL executives saw the half-hour presentation of DF1's functionalities (to have an idea of what Club RTL would offer), which launched two days later. Within days, the package was not yet approved by the Federal Cartel Office. On 2 August, the FCO sent a letter to both parties which threatened the nature of the cooperation agreement between companies, meaning that Club RTL would not broadcast on DF1's transponders as initially planned. Mid-month, Bertelsmann announced its exit from the joint pay-TV pact. Later that month, Bertelsmann joined forces with the MMBG consortium to launch Super Fernsehen. That month, it issued brochures on the service at the CeBIT Home Fair.

== Channels ==
Under Club RTL and later Super Fernsehen, the proposed service would carry the following channels:

- RTL Movie
- RTL Showtime
- RTL Action
- RTL Liga (football)
- RTL Derby (horse racing)
- RTL Globus (documentaries)
- RTL Kids
- RTL Rock
- RTL Country
- RTL Blue (erotica)
- RTL Ticket (PPV network):
  - RTL Movie Ticket
  - RTL Sport Ticket
  - RTL Event Ticket
  - RTL Erotik Ticket

== Closure ==
On 18 September 1996, Bertelsmann announced the closure of the Club RTL/Super Fernsehen package before its launch. Leo Kirch, DF1's owner, amassed a huge back catalog of titles it acquired for its own platform, while Bertelsmann failed. Bertelsmann opted to leave MMBG and reconsider its entry into the pay-TV market. That evening, a meeting was held at its offices where its 80 staff received their immediate withdrawals. Even without the downsizing of its plans, it would have delayed its launch from autumn 1996 to spring 1997. The decision led to write-offs worth LFr 3,626 billiion, and was motivated by higher than expected programming costs, the collapse of MMBG, and the merger of Canal+ with NetHold. Technical equipment would be used by other CLT assets, while the 120 staff employed, 85 of which in Luxembourg, would be re-employed within CLT.
