= Koji protein =

Modern uses of koji fungi as a protein and food ingredient

Koji protein refers to biomass derived from the filamentous fungus Aspergillus oryzae, cultivated for use as an alternative protein source in food and foodtech applications. Unlike precision fermentation, koji-based biomass fermentation grows the entire microorganism, which is then processed into a high-protein, fiber-rich food ingredient.

== Overview ==
Koji protein is considered a sustainable, scalable protein alternative due to its low input requirements, umami-rich flavor profile, and natural fermentation process. It is generally recognized as safe (GRAS) in the United States and is classified as non-novel by EFSA in the EU.

== Production and Fermentation ==
Koji protein is typically grown in solid- or liquid-state fermentation using agricultural substrates. The mycelium forms dense mats or fibrous textures, which can be processed into chunks, pastes, or powders. The enzymes produced during fermentation help create savory flavor compounds and increase digestibility.

== Applications ==
=== Meat and seafood alternatives ===
Companies like Prime Roots use koji to create fibrous meat substitutes. Berlin-based Nosh.bio is advancing koji meat alternatives ingredient, partnering with Zur Mühlen.

=== Dairy alternatives ===
Koji is also used in sustainable dairy alternatives like Formo’s cheese products.

=== Culinary and functional flavorings ===
Koji is used to dry-age meats, ferment vegetables, and create vegan condiments.

== Nutritional and Health Benefits ==
Koji contains a diverse array of nutrients that contribute to its potential health benefits. It provides a rich source of B-vitamins—including B1, B2, B3, B6, B12—as well as biotin (vitamin H or B7), folic acid, and iron. The fermentation process generates enzymes, amino acids, and minerals that may support various physiological functions. Notably, koji is considered a low glycemic index food, suggesting it may help stabilize blood sugar levels compared to higher glycemic foods.

Fermentation also enhances the bioavailability of nutrients and introduces beneficial compounds, including bioactive peptides and polysaccharides. These compounds—along with glycosylceramide, a component that resists digestion but interacts with gut microbiota—suggest that koji may play a role in promoting gut health by supporting a healthy balance of intestinal bacteria and improving nutrient absorption.

== Industrial and Commercial Use ==
Aspergillus oryzae, a filamentous fungus with Generally Recognized as Safe (GRAS) status, serves as a cornerstone of industrial biotechnology due to its enzymatic versatility and adaptability.

=== Industrial Enzyme Production ===
A. oryzae is a widely used host for industrial enzyme synthesis, owing to its efficient secretory system and ability to perform post-translational modifications. Key enzymes produced and their industrial applications include:

Enzyme	Industrial Applications
α-Amylase	Starch hydrolysis for biofuels, brewing
Glucoamylase	Saccharification in ethanol production
Proteases	Meat tenderization, detergent formulations
Lipases	Food flavoring, biodiesel synthesis
β-Galactosidase	Production of lactose-free dairy products

The global industrial enzyme market was valued at USD 7.42 billion in 2023 and relies heavily on microbial production systems, with A. oryzae accounting for approximately 85% of fungal-derived enzymes.

=== Pharmaceutical and Biotech Applications ===
A. oryzae has also been engineered for use in pharmaceutical and high-value biotech applications.

- Recombinant Antibodies: Modified strains can produce therapeutic proteins such as anti-TNFα antibodies (e.g., adalimumab), with engineered glycosylation patterns suitable for medical use.
- Secondary Metabolites:

 * Kojic Acid: A natural tyrosinase inhibitor used in skincare, produced via regulation of the AoGld3 gene.[9]
 * L-Malic Acid: A food additive synthesized through engineered TCA cycle pathways.[7]

== Market and Regulation ==
- Koji protein has received GRAS status by the FDA and is non-novel under EFSA.
- Enzyme market segments involving koji include glucoamylase, alpha-amylase, cellulase, and protease, valued collectively in the billions.

== See also ==
- Mycoprotein
- Biomass fermentation
- Plant-based meat
