= Bernd Hartmann =

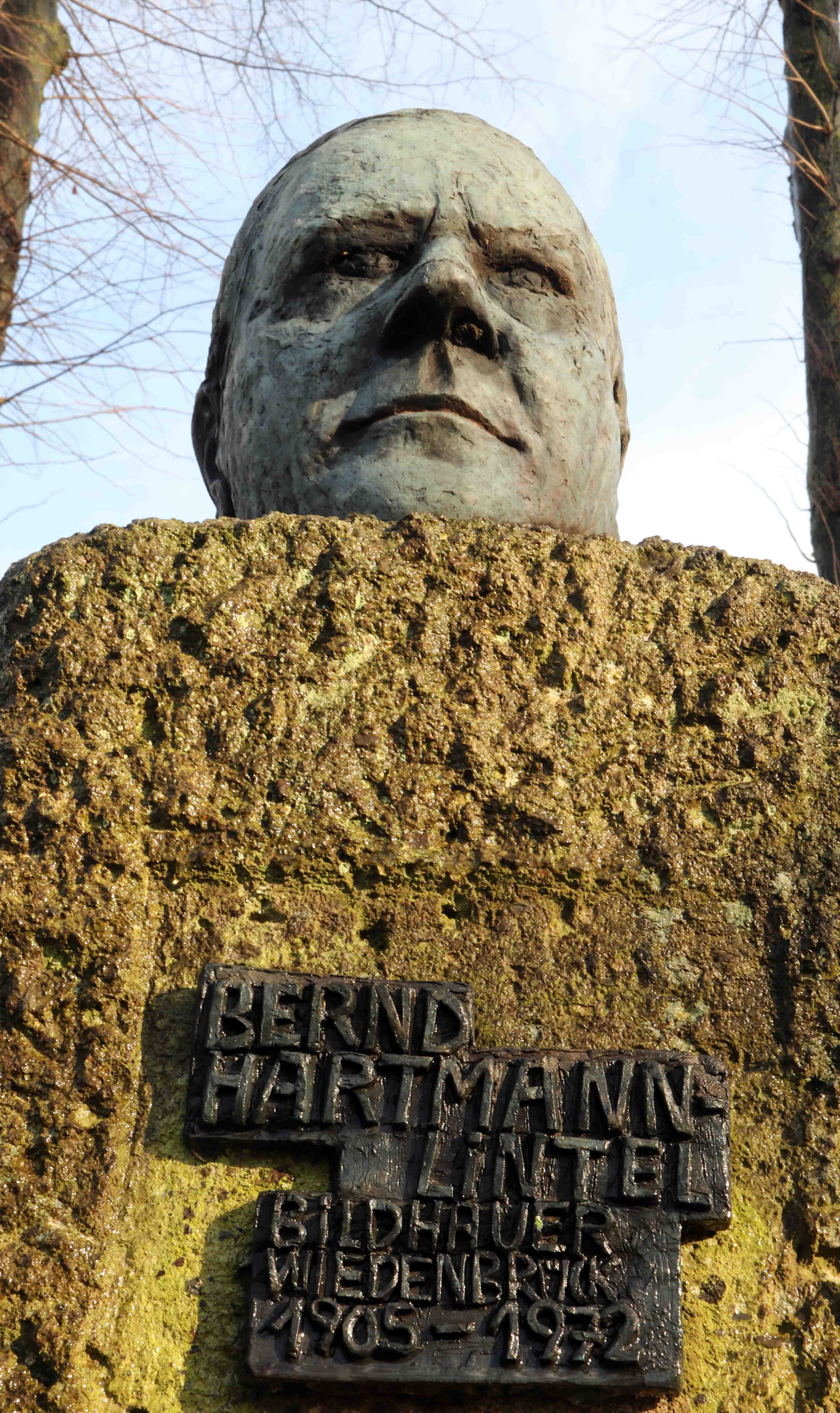
Ima Hartmann-Rochelle: Bernd Hartmann sculpture in Rheda-Wiedenbrück

Bernd Hartmann (11 October 1905 in Wiedenbrück – 28 October 1972 in Rheda-Wiedenbrück), aliases Bernd Hartmann-Wiedenbrück and Bernd Hartmann-Lintel, was an academic sculptor and sacral artist. He belonged to the Wiedenbrücker Schule school of arts.

Hartmann came from a family of artists. His father Heinrich Hartmann (1868–1937) and his brother Hubert Hartmann (1915–2006) were also sculptors. After having been trained in Wiedenbrück between 1920 and 1924, Bernd Hartmann at first worked in Kleve, Osnabrück and Düsseldorf. From 1927 to 1935, he studied in Munich, followed by professorships in Münster and Munich. During the time of National Socialism, 20 of his works were exhibited at the Great German Arts Exhibition in the Munich House of Arts. Many of his works from this period have to be considered Nazi propaganda art, e.g. the statues Minenstecher (Land Mine Searcher, 1940, sold to Adolf Hitler for a price of 5,900 reichsmark) and Schütze (Rifleman, sold to Hitler for a price of 14,000 reichsmark).

After the end of World War II, Bernd Hartmann moved back to his native region and predominantly produced religious art. In 1956, he married the artist Ima Rochelle. Bernd Hartmann died in 1972. In Rheda-Wiedenbrück, the street where he lived is named after him. Furthermore, a sculpture of the artist made by his wife is exhibited in a public park.

== Sculptures ==
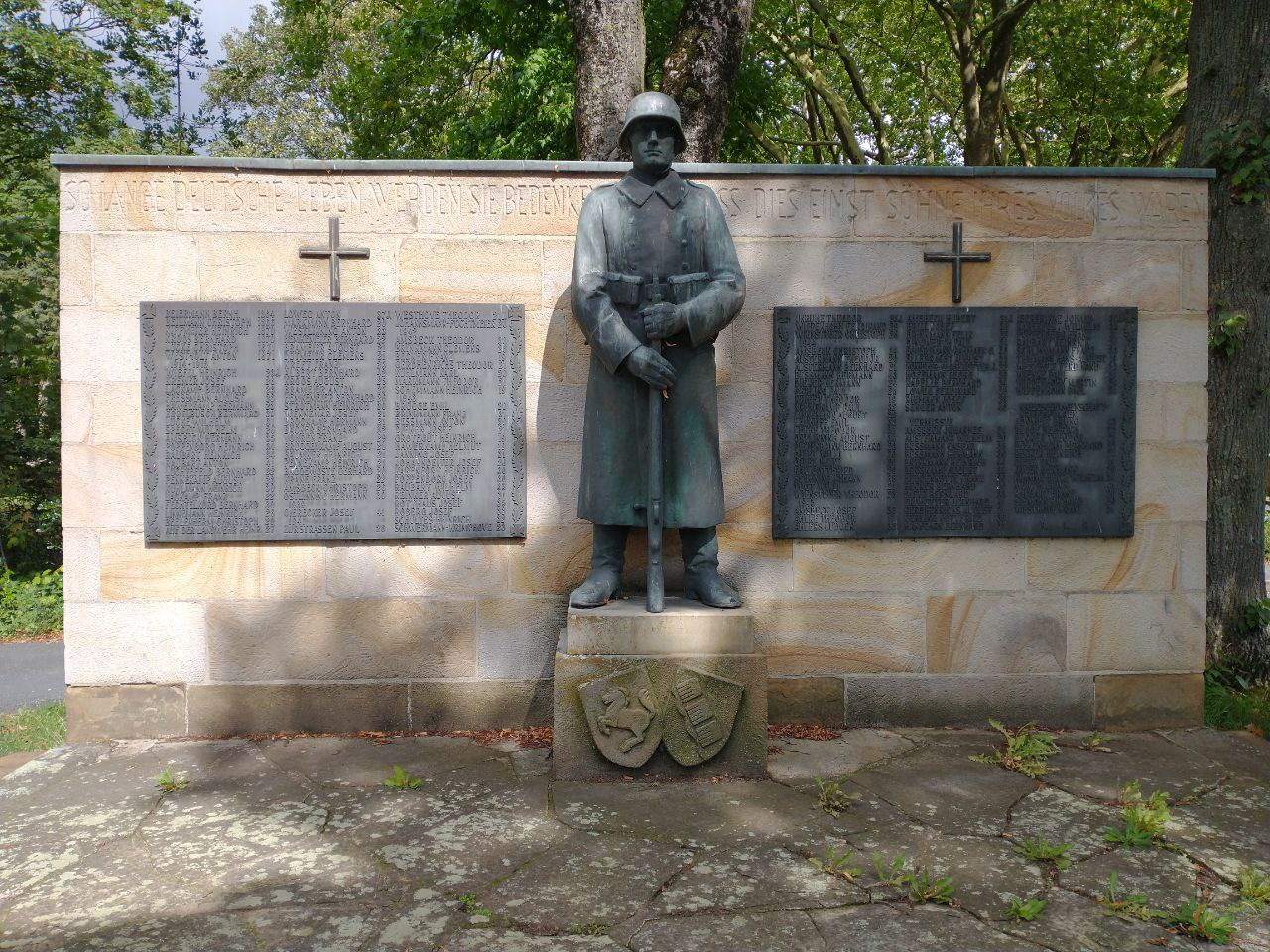
War memorial in Greffen

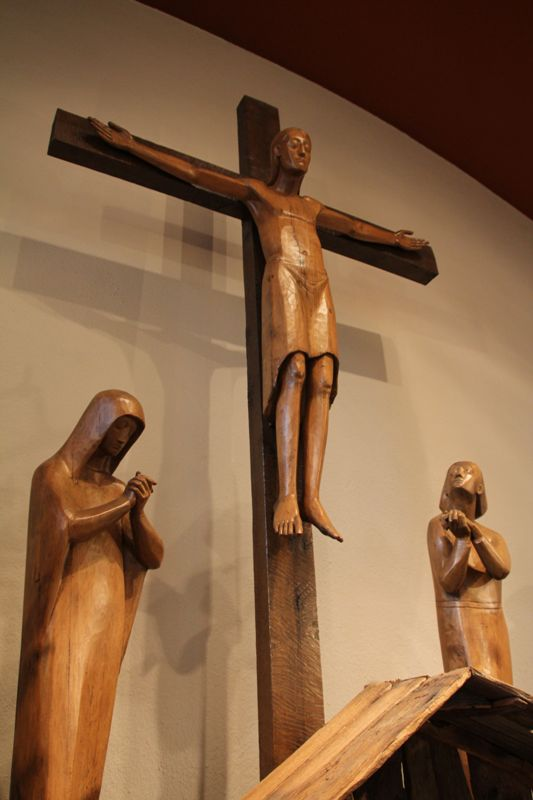
Crucifixion scene in protestant Church, Wiedenbrück

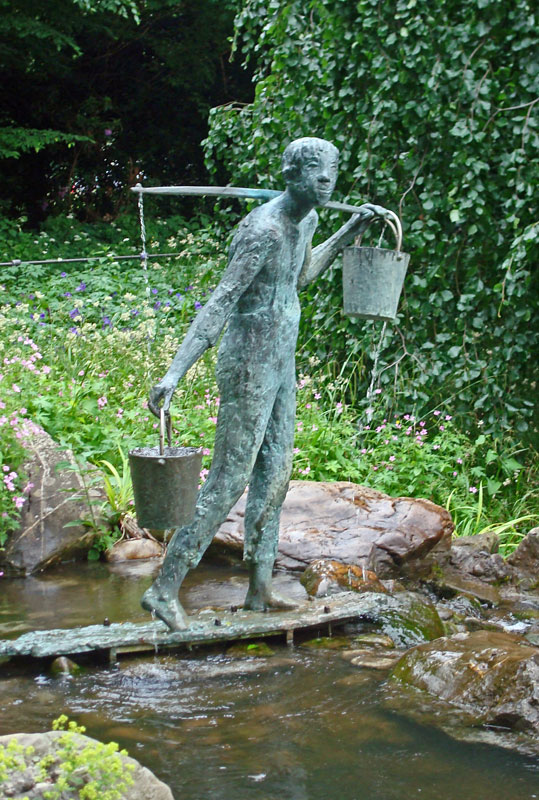
Water bearer in Gütersloh (2012; sculpture stolen in 2013)

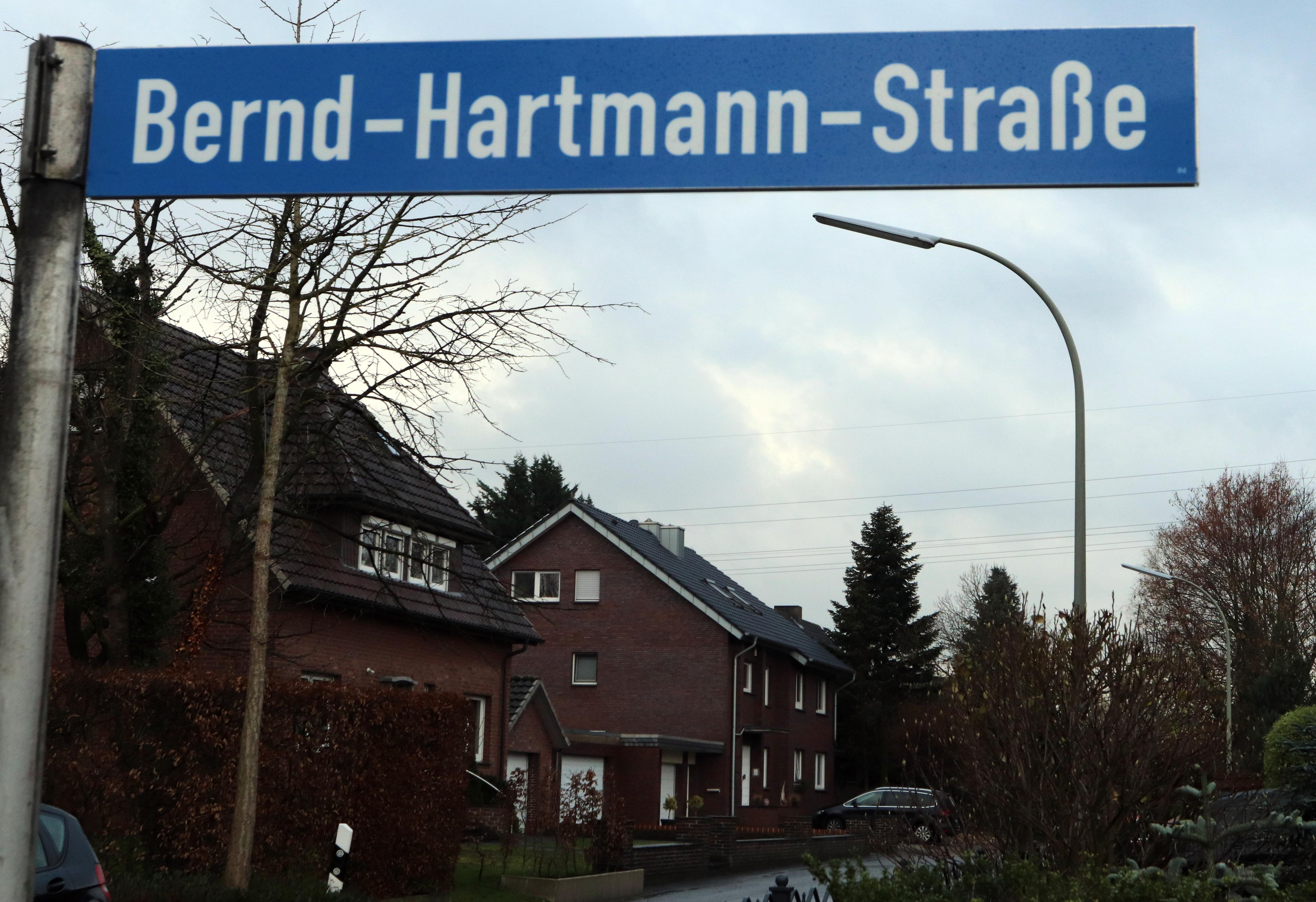
Bernd Hartmann Street in Rheda-Wiedenbrueck

- War memorial in Greffen (1938).
- Pflasterer (Great German Arts Exhibition 1939).
- Minenstecher (Great German Arts Exhibition 1940).
- Schütze (Great German Arts Exhibition 1941).
- Spähtrupp (Great German Arts Exhibition 1942).
- Aufstürmender Grenadier (Great German Arts Exhibition 1943).
- Deutsche Jugend (Great German Arts Exhibition 1944).
- Altar Cross Saint Cecilia Church in Westönnen (1953).
- Wooden crib figurine in der Saint Salvator Church in Cologne (1958/70).
- Memorial in Verne (1964).
- Wayside cross in Mengede (1969).
- In collaboration with Ima Hartmann-Rochelle: Baptismal font in the Basilica of the Annunciation in Nazareth.
