= Katja Urbatsch =

German education activist

Katja Urbatsch (born 1979) is the co-founder and Managing Director of the non-profit organization ArbeiterKind.de, headquartered in Berlin. She is also an author of non-fiction and educational issues.

== Life and education ==
Urbatsch was born in 1979 and grew up in Rheda-Wiedenbrück, Germany. Her parents did banking apprenticeships. Later on her father worked as a self-employed real estate agent. In 1998, Urbatsch completed the general university entrance qualification and went on to attended the Free University of Berlin where she studied American Studies, Business Administration, and Communication Studies.

Urbatsch applied for a scholarship from the German Academic Exchange Service (DAAD) and in 2002 was able to spend a year studying abroad at Boston University.

In 2007, she took on a job as a research assistant in public relations and began working on her PhD in American Studies at the International Graduate Center for the Study of Culture (GCSC) at the Justus Liebig University (JLU) Giessen.

== ArbeiterKind.de ==
Urbatsch and her brother were the first in their family to pursue university educations. Early on in her university studies, she noticed a distinct information deficit compared to students from academic families, particularly with regard to vocabulary, prestigious internships and scholarships.

In 2008, she co-founded the peer-to-peer exchange platform ArbeiterKind.de with her brother Marc Urbatsch and her partner Wolf Dermann, with the vision to provide all children in Germany from non-academic families with the opportunity of educational advancements. The organization reaches around 30,000 people a year, through information events or discussions at information booths. It is made up of 6000 volunteers and 25 full-time employees working in 75 cities in local groups.

== Community involvement ==
She meets regularly with members of the Bundestag and state parliaments providing suggestions on improvements to be made to the education system.

In May 2019, Urbatsch appeared as an invited expert at a Bundestag public hearing on the planned 26th reform of the Federal Training Assistance Act (BaföG), where she called for stronger support for first-generation students and simpler applications. When the 27th reform was being considered in May 2022, Urbatsch provided her opinion of the amendment.

== Awards and honors ==
Urbatsch has been an Ashoka Fellow since 2009.

In April 2011, she received the Marburg Beacon for Social Civil Rights (Marburger Leuchtfeuer) award.

The GCSC awarded her the title of Honorary Senator in 2018.

On 2 October 2018, Katja Urbatsch was among the 29 people awarded the Federal Cross of Merit on ribbon (Bundesverdienstkreuz am Band).

In November 2018, she was honored with the University of Applied Sciences Hildesheim/Holzminden/Göttingen HAWK Prize.

In September 2024, she was among the 12 awarded the Order of Merit of the State of Berlin.

== Publications ==
- Als Arbeiterkind an die Uni: Praktisches für alle, die als Erste/r in ihrer Familie studieren
- Ausgebremst Warum das Recht auf Bildung nicht für alle gilt. Heyne, München 2011
