= Willms =

Willms is a surname. Notable people with the surname include:

- André Willms (born 1972), German rower
- Jesse Willms (born 1987), Canadian businessman
- John Willms (1849–1914), German Roman Catholic priest
- Karri Willms (born 1969), Canadian curler and coach
- Robert Willms (born 1969), Canadian sculptor and teacher

See also Wilms with only one "L"
