= Tobias Böckers =

German anatomist

Tobias M. Böckers is the head of the German Center for Neurodegenerative Diseases (German: Deutsches Zentrum für Neurodegenerative Erkrankungen, (DZNE)) Institute of Anatomy and Cell Biology at the University of Ulm. The focus of his work is translational protein biochemistry as it applies to neurodegenerative diseases such as ALS.

He was born in Rheda-Wiedenbrück on 2 August 1964. In 1991, he was awarded an M.D. by the University of Münster, where he also completed postdoctoral work in anatomy and molecular neurobiology in 1998.

He was President of the Anatomische Gesellschaft from 2010 to 2014. In 2019, he became a member of the German National Academy of Sciences Leopoldina.
