= Grampian Country Foods =

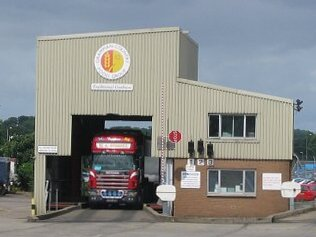

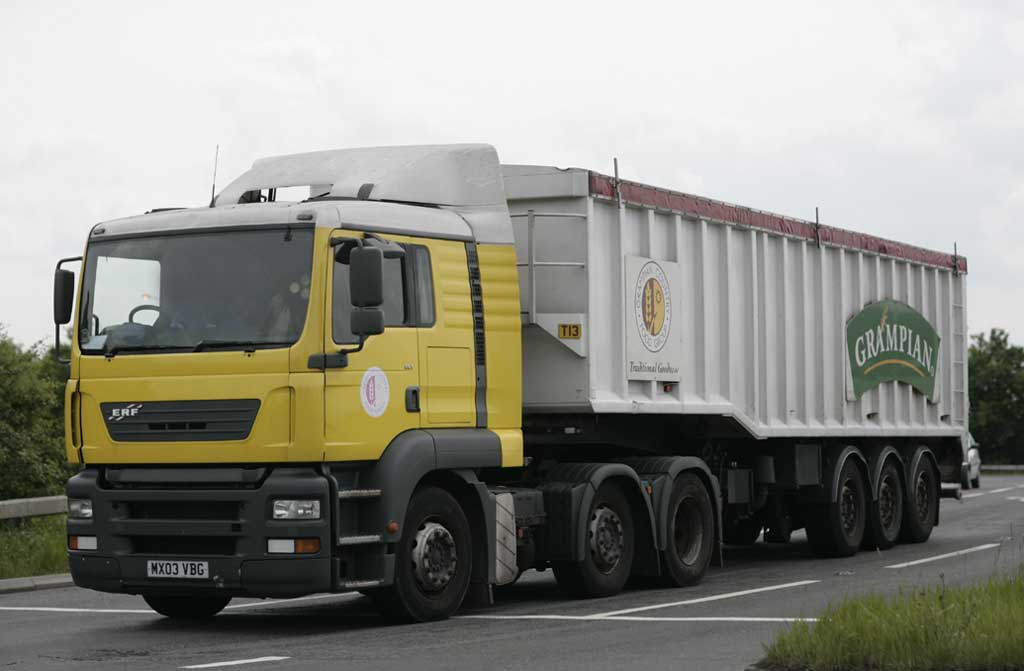

Grampian Country Foods was a Scottish-based meat processing company, now part of the UK division of Netherlands-cooperative, Vion NV.

Established in 1980 by a Scottish farming family, Grampian expanded quickly through pan-UK acquisition. Moving its headquarters to Edinburgh and then Leeds, it became the UK's biggest pig meat processor. Its food production unit produced own-brand products mainly for the UK's largest supermarket chains. From 2002 to 2006 it was the largest company by sales figures in Scotland.

Faced with financial difficulties from the late 1990s, it was sold to Vion in January 2008. During its final years before being sold the company was headed by Andrew Black from Armadale.

When fully integrated into VION's UK business, the business employed 14,000 people. The former Thailand business was now controlled from the Netherlands.

VION announced on 19 November 2012 that it planned to exit its UK operations.

In March 2013 the 2 Sisters Food Group announced the acquisition of the UK arm of VION.

In June 2013 the acquisition was granted unconditional clearance by the Office of Fair Trading (OFT).
