= Ulrich von Zons =

German politician (born 1968)

Member of the Bundestag
- Incumbent
- Assumed office 25 March 2025
- Constituency: North Rhine-Westphalia

Personal details
- Born: 11 September 1968 (age 57) Wiedenbrück
- Party: Alternative for Germany (since 2019)

Ulrich von Zons (born 11 September 1968 in Wiedenbrück) is a German politician who was elected as a member of the Bundestag in 2025. He has been a member of the Alternative for Germany since 2019.
