= Meat industry =

People and companies engaged in industrialized livestock agriculture

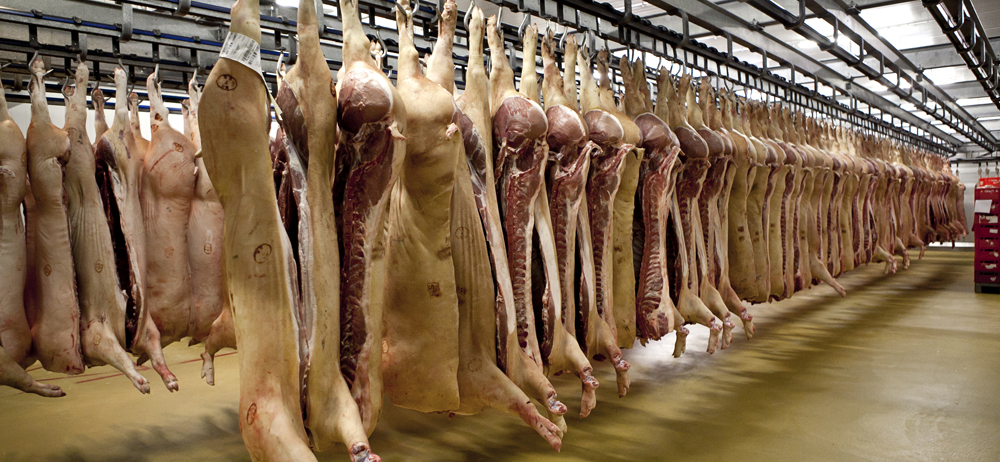
An industrial meat packing plant in Hungary, 2013

The meat industry are the people and companies engaged in modern industrialized livestock agriculture for the production, packing, preservation and marketing of meat (in contrast to dairy products, wool, etc.). In economics, the meat industry is a fusion of primary (agriculture) and secondary (industry) activity and hard to characterize strictly in terms of either one alone. The greater part of the meat industry is the meat packing industry – the segment that handles the slaughtering, processing, packaging, and distribution of animals such as poultry, cattle, pigs, sheep and other livestock.

A great portion of the ever-growing meat branch in the food industry involves intensive animal farming in which livestock are kept almost entirely indoors or in restricted outdoor settings like pens. Many aspects of the raising of animals for meat have become industrialized, even many practices more associated with smaller family farms, e.g. gourmet foods such as foie gras. This heavy industrialization leads to an outsized environmental impact, responsible for significant greenhouse gas emissions, land use change and degradation, and water, air and soil pollution.

The production of livestock is a heavily vertically integrated industry where the majority of supply chain stages are integrated and owned by one company. Each stage of the process of rearing animals to slaughter, is often concentrated in very few companies—with some companies dominating multiple stages of the industry; for example in agrochemicals used in animal production 66% of global revenue are concentrated in four firms, in animal pharmaceuticals 58%. For example, Brazil's JBS S.A. have secured market dominance in multiple sectors in the USA and Brazil and is the world's largest animal slaughter company. This large economic influence, both within countries and over international trade, has created significant political influence from the industry. A 2025 review of scholarship found that the animal agriculture industry has played an outsized role in obstructing measures to address climate change, by actively supporting disinformation campaigns, and preventing policy to address climate change.

== Global production of meat products ==
Global production of meat in 2023 was 362.9 million tons of meat, most of which was produced in industrial supply chains. Meat production is globally dominated by a handful of super producing net exporting countries of meat and meat products, such as China (97.5 million tons in 2023), the United States (47.5 million tons in 2023), and Brazil (31.6 million tons in 2023) which produce, together over 176 million tons or nearly half of global production. A full list of producers can be found at List of countries by meat production.

=== Companies ===
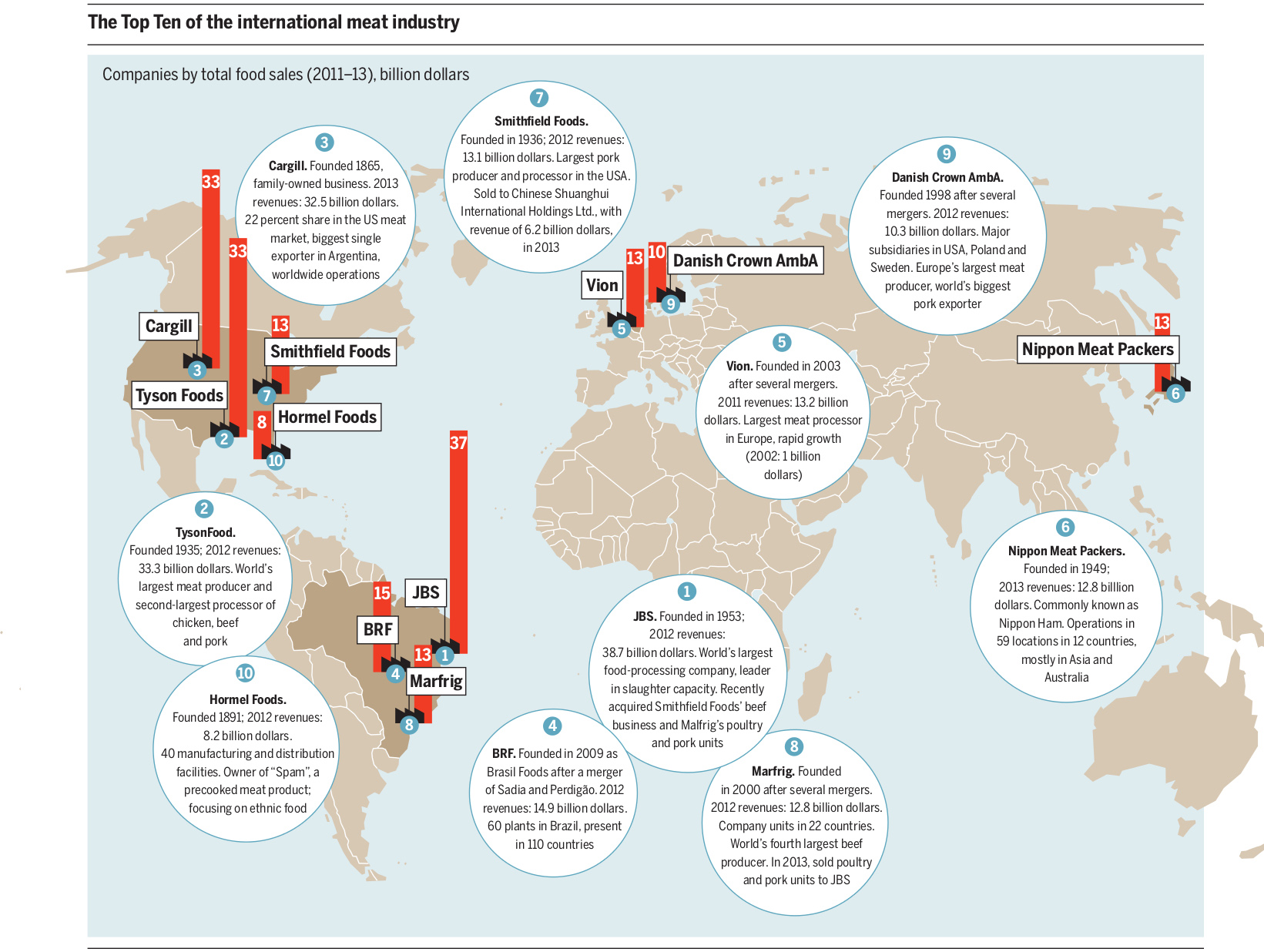
The top ten of the international meat industry

Among the largest meat producers worldwide are:

- JBS S.A. (Brazil)
- Tyson Foods (United States)
- Cargill (United States)
- Marfrig (Brazil)
- WH Group (Hong Kong)
- BRF S.A. (Brazil)
- Vion NV (Netherlands)
- Minerva Foods (Brazil)
- Danish Crown (Denmark)

Meat production is dominated by a few countries, with the United States, China and Brazil producing large portions of global meat (seen in 2022).

=== Forecasts ===
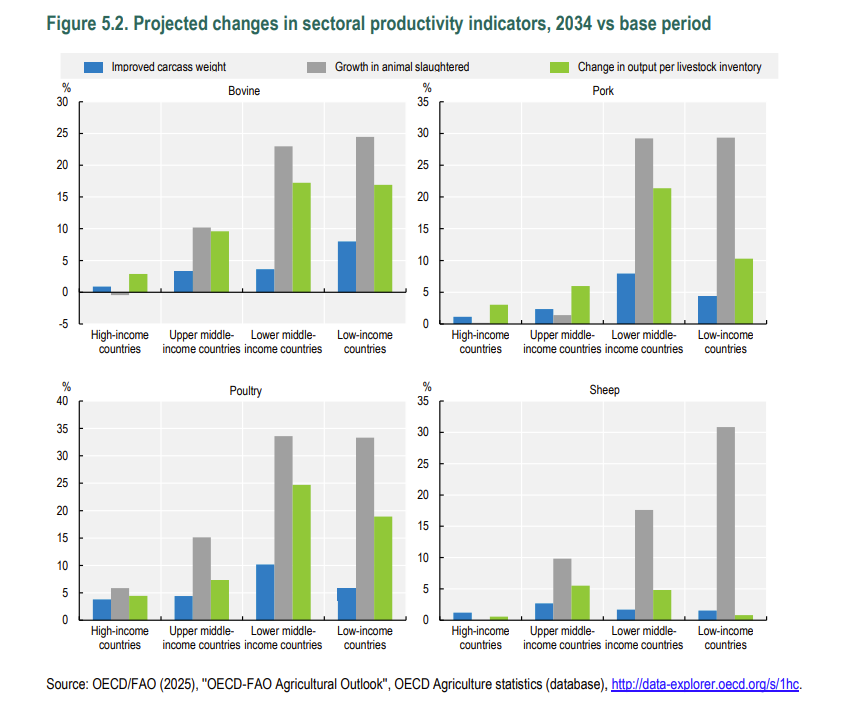
A graph showing the projected grow of meat industries for 2025-2034 from FAO/OECD

A Food and Agriculture Organization and OECD project for meat production across the world, project significant increases in animals slaughter from 2025 to 2034, as global demand for meat increases especially in lower middle income and lower income countries.

== Sectors involved ==
When describing the meat industry, typically the focus is on the steps between breeding and rearing animals, typically in industrial-type operations, and slaughter, through to the processing and distribution of the meat. Like other parts of the food system—industrial scale companies tend to combine multiple of these items.

Most companies involved in the meat industry, also own businesses, factories or brands focused on using animal by-products, such as slaughterhouse waste used in pet food, or creating inputs for the sector, such as cattle feed.

=== Animal breeding ===
Animal breeding is a branch of animal science concerned with the evaluation and selection of livestock for breeding based on genetic merit. Genetic merit may be estimated using best linear unbiased prediction and other methods to derive estimated breeding values (EBVs). Breeding objectives may include traits related to growth rate, egg, meat, milk, or wool production, as well as reproductive performance, health, and other characteristics relevant to a particular breeding programme. The scientific theory of animal breeding incorporates population genetics, quantitative genetics, statistics, and increasingly molecular genetics, and draws on the pioneering work of Sewall Wright, Jay Lush, and Charles Henderson.

=== Animal production ===
Intensive animal farming, industrial livestock production, and macro-farms, also known as factory farming, is a type of intensive agriculture used by the meat and dairy industry to maximize animal production while minimizing costs. To achieve this, agribusinesses keep livestock such as cattle, poultry, and fish at high stocking densities, at large scale, and using modern machinery, biotechnology, and pharmaceutics. The main products are meat, milk and eggs for human consumption.

While intensive animal farming can produce large amounts of animal products at a low cost with reduced human labor, it is controversial as it raises several ethical concerns, including animal exploitation, animal welfare issues (confinement, mutilations, stress-induced aggression, breeding complications), public health risks (zoonotic diseases, pandemic risks, antibiotic resistance), and worker exploitation, particularly of undocumented workers. Both intensive and extensive animal farming require significant land to feed the livestock and cause harm to the environment and wildlife through greenhouse gases, deforestation and eutrophication. The animal agriculture industry has been accused of actively supporting disinformation campaigns and preventing policies to address climate change.

Industrial livestock production is important in most of the large meat-producing regions, such as Brazil, the United States, China, Argentina, Australia, New Zealand and the European Union, with expansion of megafarms or concentrated animal feeding operations.

=== Meat packing ===
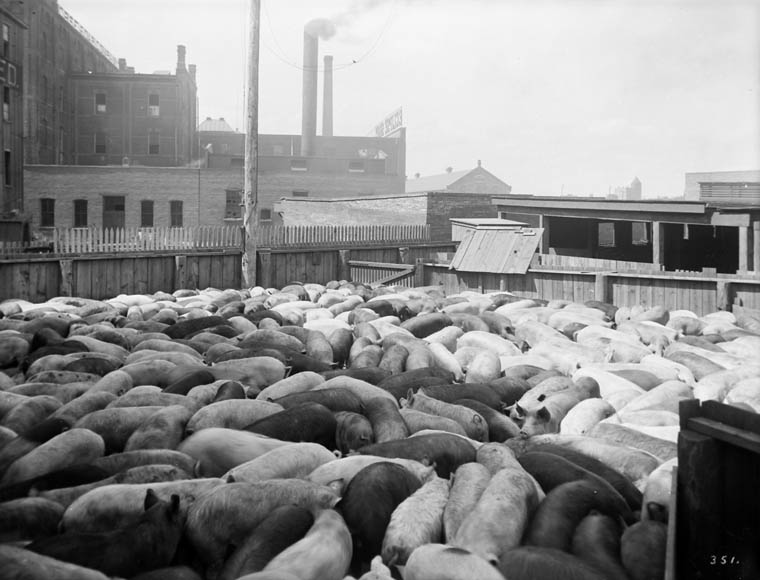
The William Davies Company facilities in Toronto, Ontario, Canada, circa 1920. This facility was then the third largest hog-packing plant in North America.

The meat-packing industry (also spelled meatpacking industry or meat packing industry) handles the slaughtering, processing, packaging, and distribution of meat from animals such as cattle, pigs, sheep and other livestock. Poultry is generally not included. This greater part of the entire meat industry is primarily focused on producing meat for human consumption, but it also yields a variety of by-products including hides, dried blood, protein meals such as meat & bone meal, and—through the process of rendering—fats (such as tallow).

In the United States and some other countries, the facility where the meat packing is done is called a slaughterhouse, packinghouse or a meat-packing plant; in New Zealand, where most of the products are exported, it is called a freezing works. An abattoir is a place where animals are slaughtered for food.

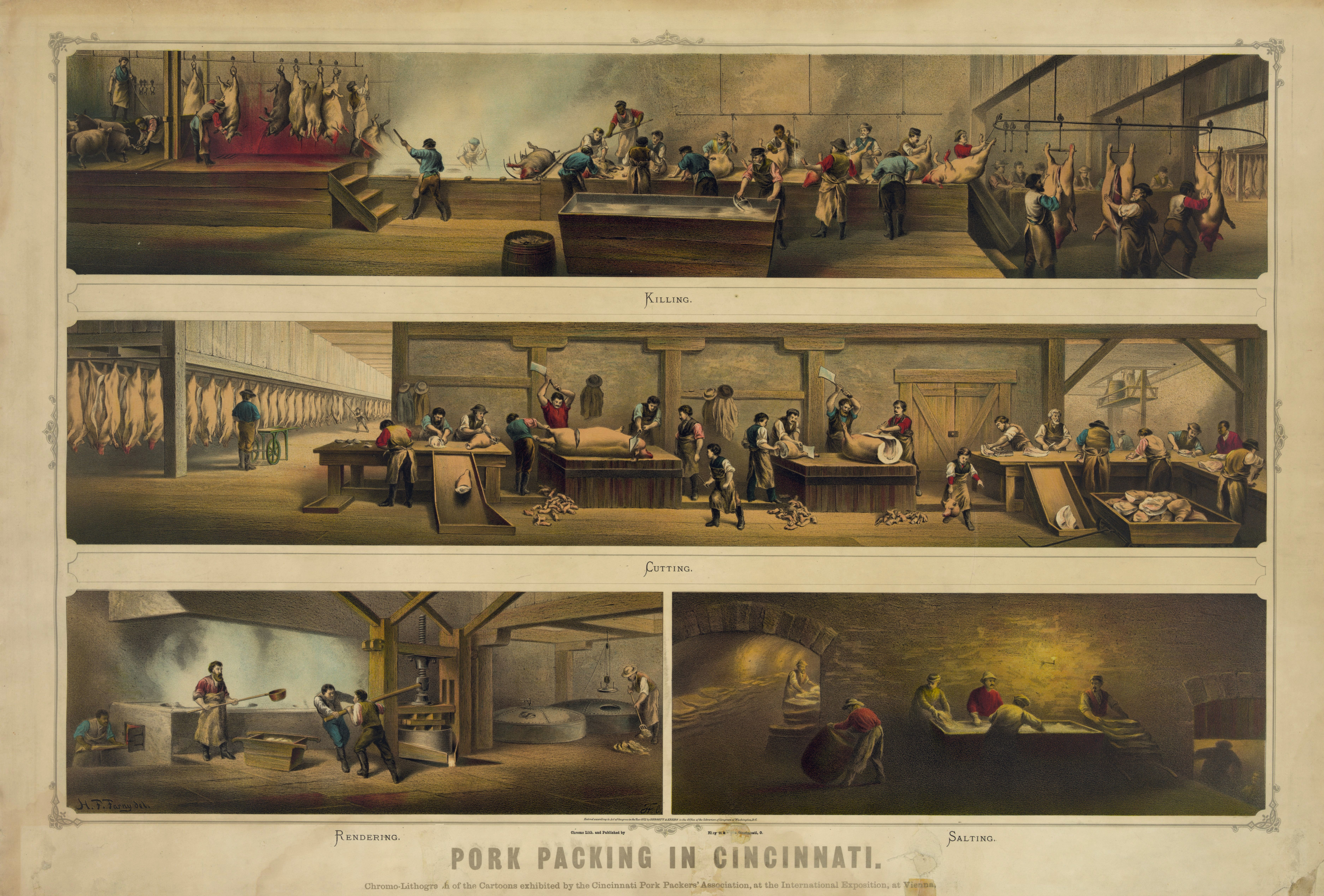
Pork packing in Cincinnati, 1873

The meat-packing industry grew with the construction of railroads and methods of refrigeration for meat preservation. Railroads made possible the transport of stock to central points for processing, and the transport of products.

Meat-packing also includes making processed meat.

=== Distribution ===
A meat jobber, also known as a meat wholesaler or meat distributor, is an entity that purchases meat products from producers, typically in large quantities, and sells them to retailers.

Meat jobbers came to prominence in the 1940s, as the American highway system began to expand, superseding rail-based branch houses.

Some meat jobbers known as meat breakers or meat boners would further process meat. In preparation for resale to retail, they "broke" the meat down from quarters to subprimal cuts and boned them prior to shipping. Retailers used these meat jobbers since they offered flexibility in cuts, and independent packers used them since they had to do minimal processing, requiring minimal capital investment.

A meat broker is an entity of the meat industry that brokers the buying and selling of meat, carcasses, animal products, and animals such as cattle, sheep, swine, goats, horses, etc. Meat brokers can also be known as poultry brokers or meat and poultry broker depending on their offerings.

== Criticism ==
Criticized aspects and effects of industrial meat production include:

- Hormone treatment such as steroids and the effect of consuming meat from animals raised with these on human consumers (see also Beef hormone controversy)
- Spread of animal diseases, e.g. mad-cow disease (BSE), avian flu, swine influenza (H1N1), avian influenza (H5N1), foot-and-mouth disease, including to human consumers
- The commonness of cruelty to animals in the meat industry
- Certain animal rights advocates and groups believe that the production of meat is unethical and the industry should be abolished
- Contribution of the overconsumption of meat products to obesity
- Spread of human disease associated with animal waste, e.g. through E. coli
  - Cost of state services associated with the above, including meat inspection and health care
- Spread of human disease associated with workers in meat and poultry processing facilities

Many observers suggest that the expense of dealing with the above is grossly underestimated by present economic metrics and that true cost accounting would drastically raise the price of industrial meat.

=== Animal welfare ===
Land animals slaughtered for meat

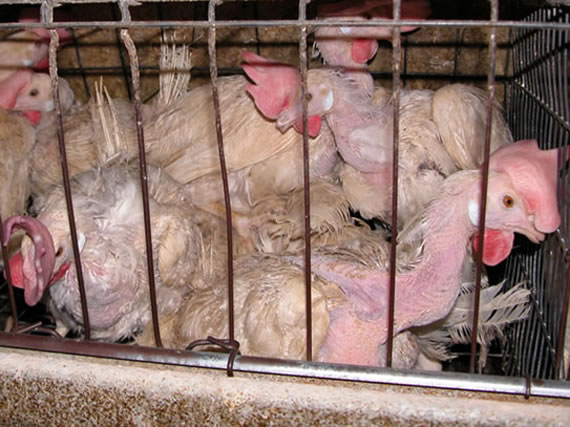
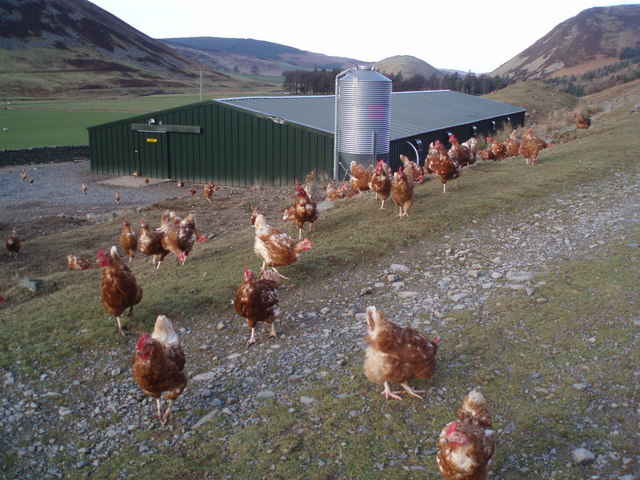

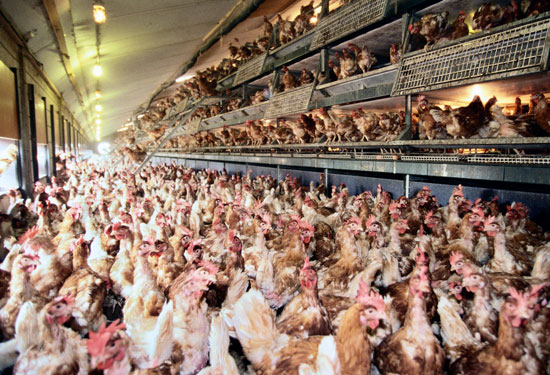
The welfare of egg laying hens in battery cages (top) can be compared with the welfare of free range hens (middle and bottom) which are given access to the outdoors. However, animal welfare groups argue that the vast majority of free-range hens are still intensively confined (bottom) and are rarely able to go outdoors.

A major concern for the welfare of farmed animals is factory farming in which large numbers of animals are reared in confinement at high stocking densities. Issues include the limited opportunities for natural behaviors, for example, in battery cages, veal and gestation crates, instead producing abnormal behaviors such as tail-biting, cannibalism, and feather pecking, and routine invasive procedures such as beak trimming, castration, and ear notching.More extensive methods of farming, e.g. free range, can also raise welfare concerns such as the mulesing of sheep and predation of stock by wild animals. Biosecurity is also a risk with free range farming, as it allows for more contact between livestock and wild animal populations, which may carry zoonoses.

Farmed animals are artificially selected for production parameters which sometimes impinge on the animals' welfare. For example, broiler chickens are bred to be very large to produce the greatest quantity of meat per animal. Broilers bred for fast growth have a high incidence of leg deformities because the large breast muscles cause distortions of the developing legs and pelvis, and the birds cannot support their increased body weight. As a consequence, they frequently become lame or suffer from broken legs. The increased body weight also puts a strain on their hearts and lungs, and ascites often develop. In the UK alone, up to 20 million broilers each year die from the stress of catching and transporting before reaching the slaughterhouse. This stress can be measured by the high heart rates and cortisol levels, but it can also be seen in their behavior or physical changes. In situations where they are threatened, alone, or can't interact with others, these results are common. Animal welfare violations have been observed more in intensively bred chicken, pig and cattle species, respectively, and studies and laws have been enacted in this regard. However, animal welfare in semi-intensive species such as sheep and goats is nowadays being scrutinised and gaining importance.

Another concern about the welfare of farmed animals is the method of slaughter, especially ritual slaughter. While the killing of animals need not necessarily involve suffering, the general public considers that killing an animal reduces its welfare. This leads to further concerns about premature slaughtering such as chick culling by the laying hen industry, in which males are slaughtered immediately after hatching because they are superfluous; this policy occurs in other farmed animal industries such as the production of goat and cattle milk, raising the same concerns.

A 2023 report by the Animal Welfare Institute found that animal welfare claims by companies selling meat and poultry products lack adequate substantiation in roughly 85% of analyzed cases.

=== Environmental impacts ===
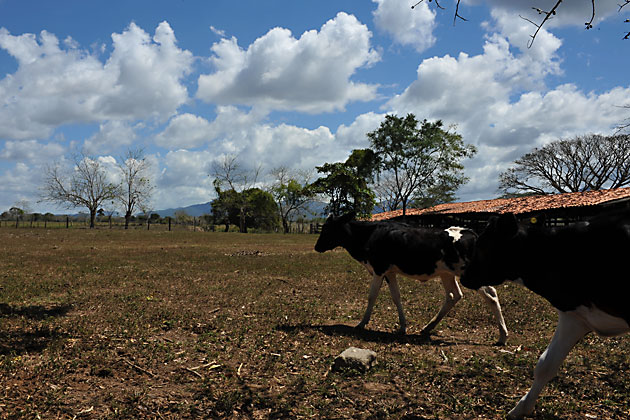
Aftermath of deforestation processes due to cattle ranching purposes in the region of Honduras

Jhalani Amit et al. reviewed the impact of meat production and slaughterhouses and found that beef is one of the most pollutiong product in its lifecycle. The water footprint of meat is 10 times that of the agriculture based food.

Agricultural practices have been found to have a variety of effects on the environment to some extent. Animal agriculture, in particular meat production, can cause pollution, greenhouse gas emissions, biodiversity loss, disease, and significant consumption of land, food, and water. Meat is obtained through a variety of methods, including organic farming, free-range farming, intensive livestock production, and subsistence agriculture. The livestock sector also includes wool, egg and dairy production, the livestock used for tillage, and fish farming.

Animal agriculture is a significant contributor to greenhouse gas emissions. Cows, sheep, and other ruminants digest their food by enteric fermentation, and their burps are the main source of methane emissions from land use, land-use change, and forestry. Together with methane and nitrous oxide from manure, this makes livestock the main source of greenhouse gas emissions from agriculture. A significant reduction in meat consumption is essential to mitigate climate change.

=== Effects on livestock workers ===
American slaughterhouse workers are three times more likely to suffer serious injury than the average American worker. NPR reports that pig and cattle slaughterhouse workers are nearly seven times more likely to suffer repetitive strain injuries than average. The Guardian reports that, on average, there are two amputations a week involving slaughterhouse workers in the United States. On average, one employee of Tyson Foods, the largest meat producer in America, is injured and amputates a finger or limb per month. The Bureau of Investigative Journalism reported that over a period of six years, in the UK 78 slaughter workers lost fingers, parts of fingers or limbs, more than 800 workers had serious injuries, and at least 4,500 had to take more than three days off after accidents. In a 2018 study in the Italian Journal of Food Safety, slaughterhouse workers are instructed to wear ear protectors to protect their hearing from the constant screams of animals being killed. A 2004 study in the Journal of Occupational and Environmental Medicine found that "excess risks were observed for mortality from all causes, all cancers, and lung cancer" in workers employed in the New Zealand meat processing industry.

The worst thing, worse than the physical danger, is the emotional toll. If you work in the stick pit [where hogs are killed] for any period of time—that let's [sic] you kill things but doesn't let you care. You may look a hog in the eye that's walking around in the blood pit with you and think, 'God, that really isn't a bad looking animal.' You may want to pet it. Pigs down on the kill floor have come up to nuzzle me like a puppy. Two minutes later I had to kill them – beat them to death with a pipe. I can't care.

— Gail A. Eisnitz,

The act of slaughtering animals, or of raising or transporting animals for slaughter, may engender psychological stress or trauma in the people involved. A 2016 study in Organization indicates, "Regression analyses of data from 10,605 Danish workers across 44 occupations suggest that slaughterhouse workers consistently experience lower physical and psychological well-being along with increased incidences of negative coping behavior." A 2009 study by criminologist Amy Fitzgerald indicates, "slaughterhouse employment increases total arrest rates, arrests for violent crimes, arrests for rape, and arrests for other sex offenses in comparison with other industries." As authors from the PTSD Journal explain, "These employees are hired to kill animals, such as pigs and cows, that are largely gentle creatures. Carrying out this action requires workers to disconnect from what they are doing and from the creature standing before them. This emotional dissonance can lead to consequences such as domestic violence, social withdrawal, anxiety, drug and alcohol abuse, and PTSD."

Slaughterhouses in the United States commonly illegally employ and exploit underage workers and illegal immigrants. In 2010, Human Rights Watch described slaughterhouse line work in the United States as a human rights crime. In a report by Oxfam America, slaughterhouse workers were observed not being allowed breaks, were often required to wear diapers, and were paid below minimum wage.

== Industry for alternative meats ==
Because of the outsized environmental and social impact of the meat industry, multiple industrial and social movements have proposed alternatives to a meat industry. Notable amongst these are cultured meat and meat alternatives, both industrially manufactured substitutes for meat for people seeking the experience of meat in food, without the associated environmental or ethical impacts. However, neither industry has taken a significant portion of the market. After much hype during the late 2010s and early 2020s, many of the larger companies, such as Beyond Meat, pursuing meat alternatives saw a significant drop in value.

=== Alternative meat industry ===
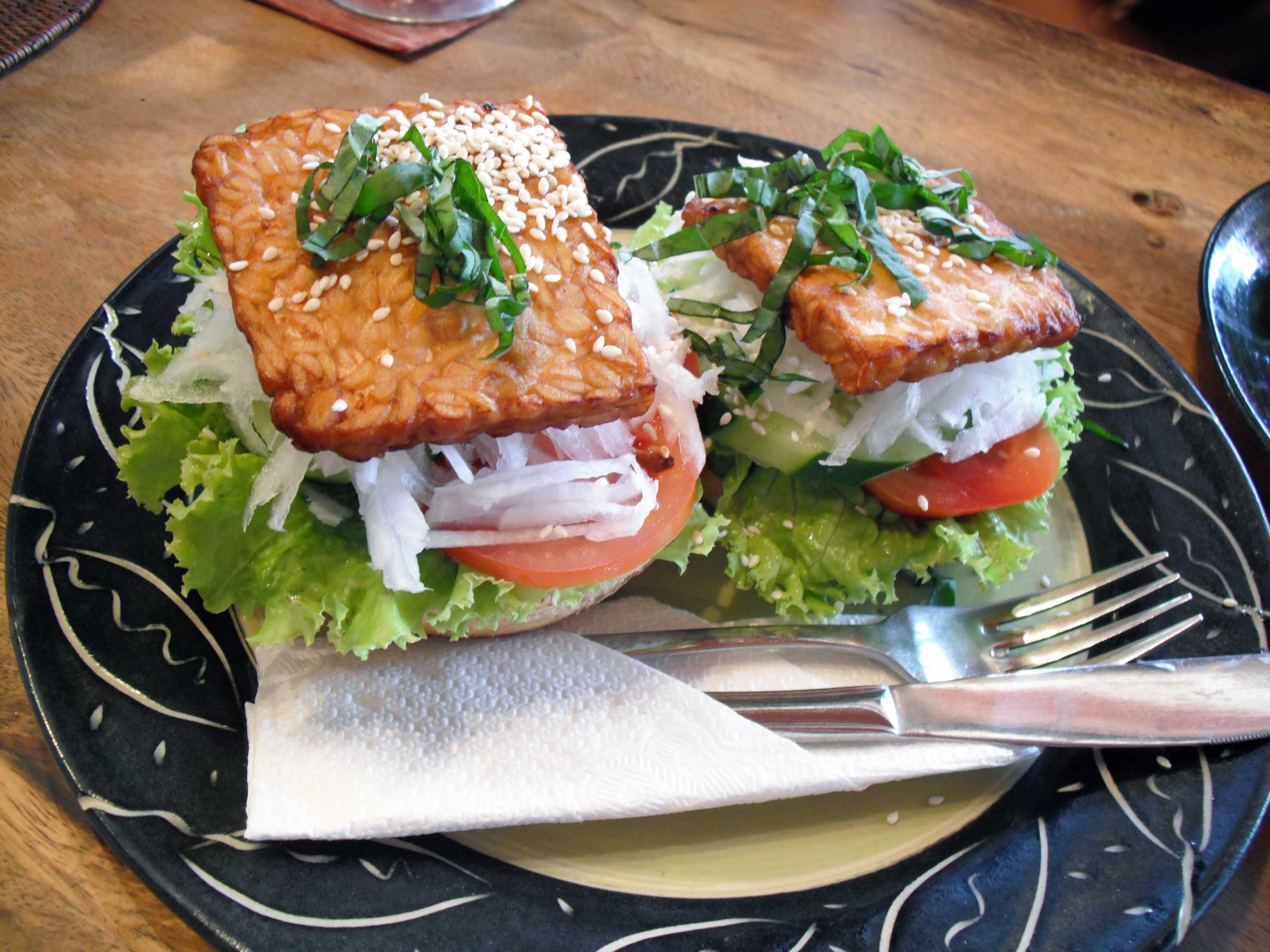
A tempeh burger

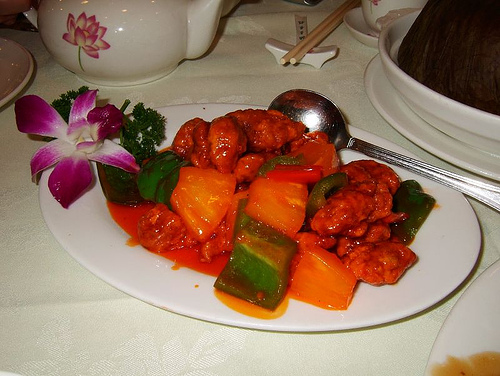
Chinese style tofu from Buddhist cuisine is prepared as an alternative to meat.

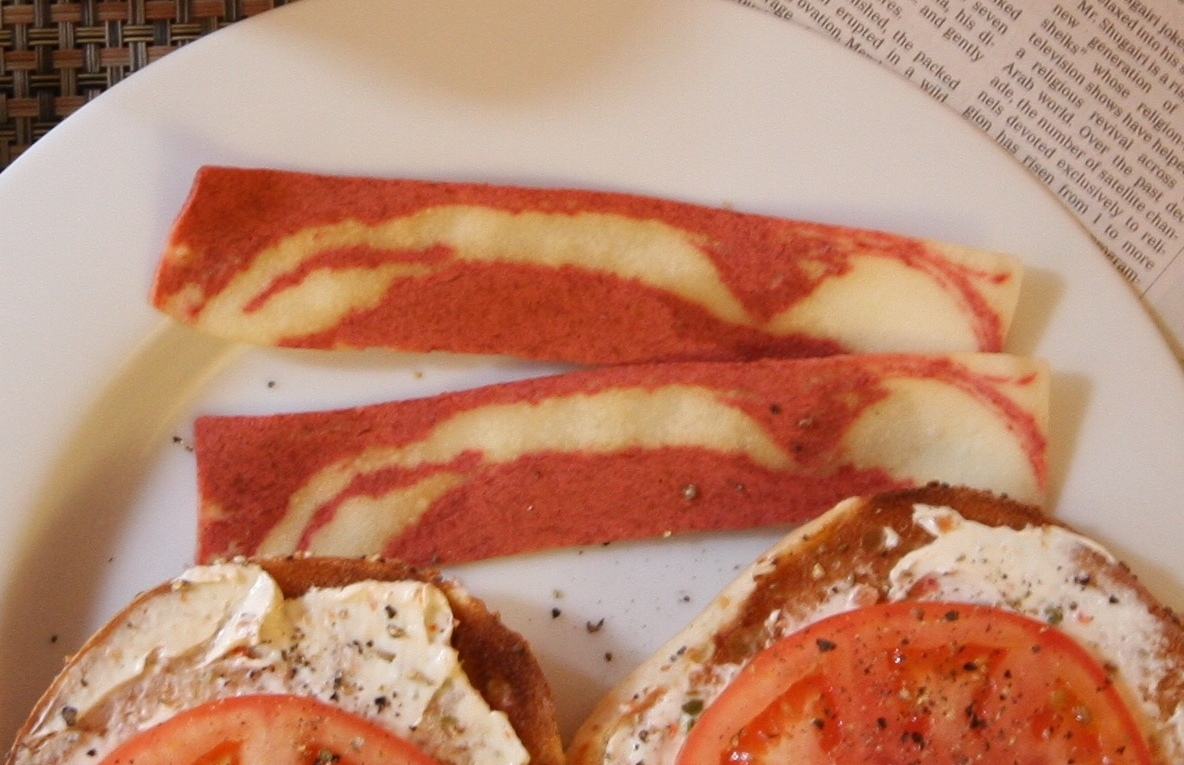
Two slices of vegetarian bacon

A meat alternative or meat substitute, also referred to as a plant-based meat, mock meat, or alternative protein, is a food product that is made from vegetarian or vegan ingredients and is consumed as a replacement for meat. The objective of meat alternatives is to replicate the qualities of meat, including its mouthfeel, flavor, appearance and nutritional values. Plant- and fungus-based substitutes are frequently made with soy (e.g., tofu, tempeh, and textured vegetable protein), but may also be made from wheat gluten as in seitan, pea protein as in the Beyond Burger, or mycoprotein as in Quorn. Alternative protein foods can also be made by precision fermentation, where single cell organisms such as yeast produce specific proteins using a carbon source; or can be grown by culturing animal cells outside an animal, based on tissue engineering techniques. The composition of meat alternatives varies widely by product and may include plant or fungal proteins, fats or oils, flavorings, binders and coloring agents.

Meatless tissue engineering involves the cultivation of stem cells on natural or synthetic scaffolds to create meat-like products. Scaffolds can be made from various materials, including plant-derived biomaterials, synthetic polymers, animal-based proteins, and self-assembling polypeptides. It is these 3D scaffold-based methods that provide a specialized structural environment for cellular growth. Alternatively, scaffold-free methods promote cell aggregation, allowing cells to self-organize into tissue-like structures.

Meat alternatives are typically consumed as a source of dietary protein by vegetarians, vegans, and people following religious and cultural dietary laws; however, global demand for sustainable diets has also increased their popularity among non-vegetarians and flexitarians seeking to reduce the environmental impact of animal agriculture. Life-cycle assessments generally find that plant-based meat alternatives have lower greenhouse-gas emissions than conventional meat products, although impacts vary according to ingredients, processing methods and production systems. Meat substitution has a long history. Tofu was invented in China as early as 200 BCE, and in the Middle Ages, chopped nuts and grapes were used as a substitute for mincemeat during Lent. Since the 2010s, startup companies such as Impossible Foods and Beyond Meat have popularized pre-made plant-based substitutes for ground beef, burger patties, and chicken nuggets as commercial products.

=== Cultured meat industry ===
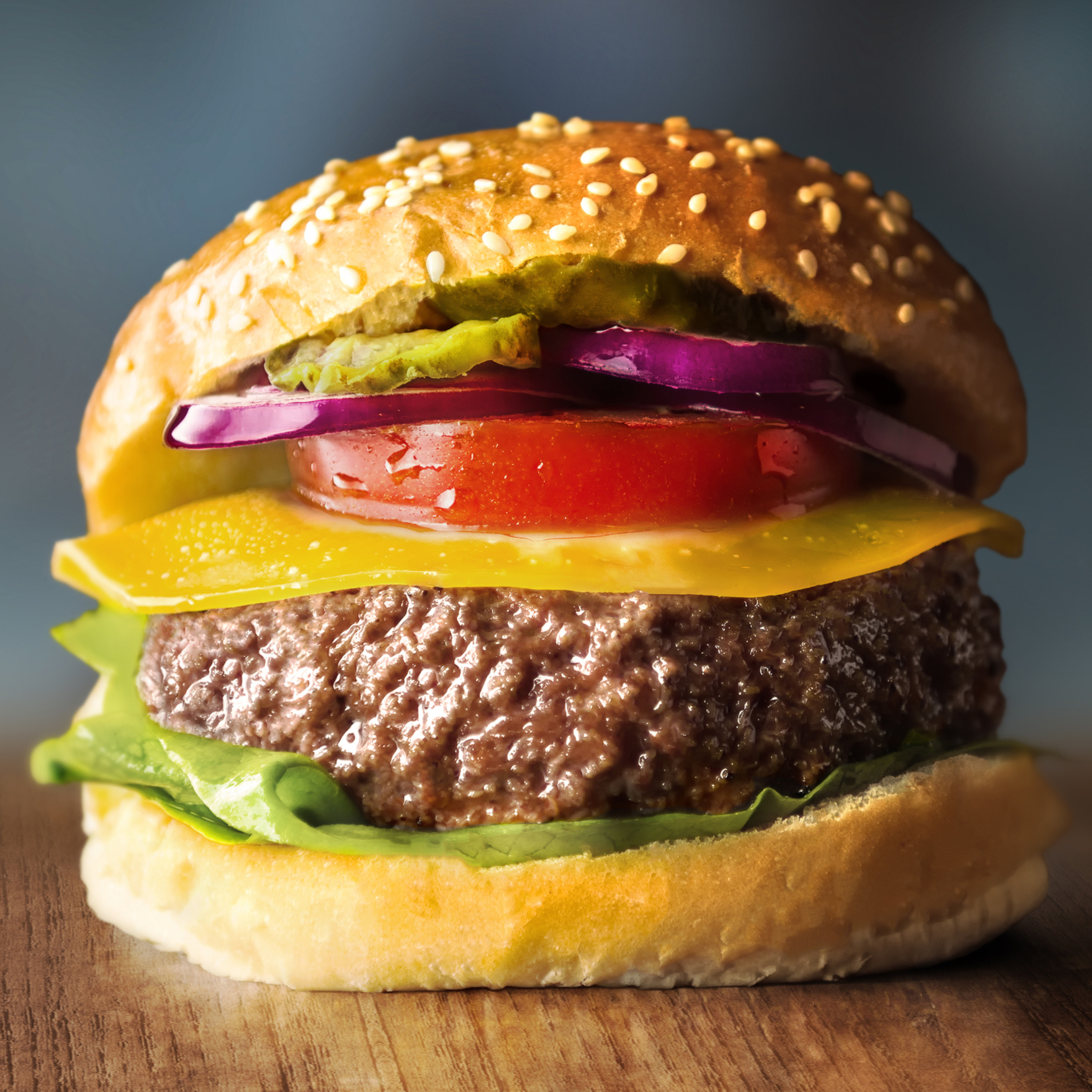
The first cell-cultured hamburger, cooked at a news conference in London, 2013

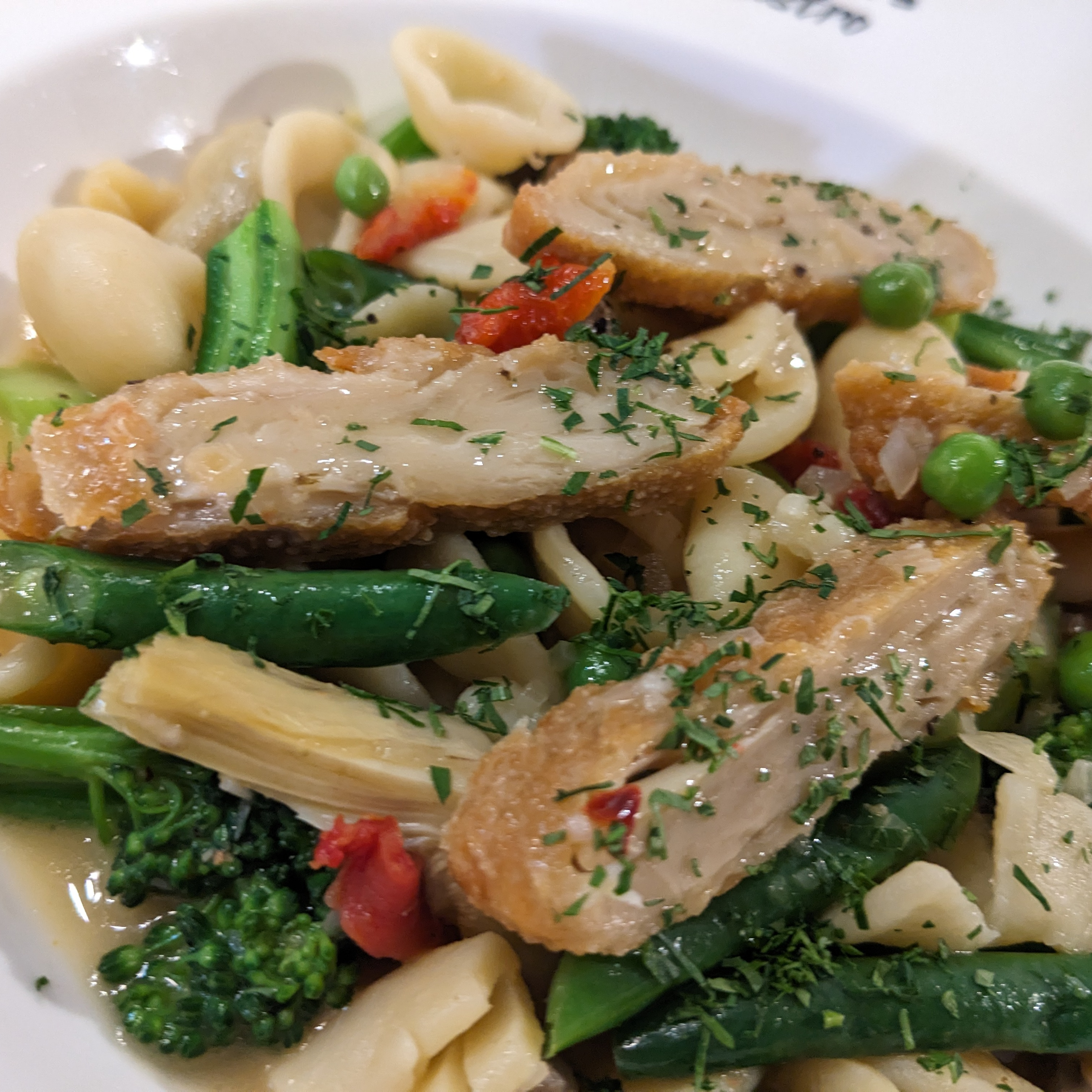
Cultured chicken in pasta salad, served at a restaurant in Singapore, 2023

Cultured meat, also known as cultivated meat among other names, is a form of cellular agriculture wherein meat is produced by culturing animal cells in vitro. This production method involves the molecularly identical growth of animal flesh, outside of a living animal. Cultured meat is produced using tissue engineering techniques pioneered in regenerative medicine. It is known for its potential to mitigate the environmental impact of meat production, as well as to address issues related to animal welfare, food security, and human health. Its potential has long been of interest, including to British statesman Winston Churchill in 1931.

Mark Post of the University of Maastricht presents The Meat Revolution, a lecture about cultured meat, 2015

Isha Datar of New Harvest on how a "post-animal bio-economy" can be brought about through cultured meat, eggs, and milk, 2017

Jason Matheny popularized the concept in the early 2000s after he co-authored a paper on cultured meat production and created New Harvest, the world's first non-profit organization dedicated to in vitro meat research. In 2013, Mark Post created a hamburger patty made from tissue grown outside of an animal; other cultured meat prototypes have gained media attention since. In 2020, SuperMeat opened a farm-to-fork restaurant in Tel Aviv called The Chicken, serving cultured chicken burgers in exchange for reviews to test consumer reaction rather than money; while the "world's first commercial sale of cell-cultured meat" occurred in December 2020 at Singapore restaurant 1880, where cultured chicken manufactured by United States firm Eat Just was sold.

Most efforts focus on common meats such as pork, beef, and chicken; species which constitute the bulk of conventional meat consumption in developed countries. Some companies have pursued various species of fish and other seafood, such as Avant Meats who brought cultured grouper to market in 2021. Other companies such as Orbillion Bio have focused on high-end or unusual meats including elk, lamb, bison, and Wagyu beef.

The production process of cultured meat is constantly evolving, driven by companies and research institutions. The applications for cultured meat have led to ethical, health, environmental, cultural, and economic discussions. Data published by The Good Food Institute found that in 2021 through 2023, cultured meat and seafood companies attracted over $2.5 billion in investment worldwide. However, cultured meat is not yet widely available.

In January 2024, a study demonstrated that cow cells can produce their own growth factors and do not require the expensive recombinant growth factors or fetal bovine serum.

In November 2025, a study demonstrated that cow cells can be spontaneously immortalized after 500 days without genetic modification, similar to how chicken cells are readily spontaneously immortalized in culture.

== See also ==
- Agricultural engineering
- Agricultural robot
- Dairy industry in the United Kingdom
- Dairy industry in the United States
- Dairy industry
- Golden Triangle of Meat-packing
- Grinder-mixer
- ICT in agriculture
- Leather
- List of largest meat companies in Germany
- Meat Industry Workers Federation
- Meat market
- North American Meat Institute (NAMI)
- Pink slime, white slime
- Poultry industry
- Red meat
- Rendering (animal products)
- Slaughterhouse
- World Beef Report
