= World Beef Report =

World Beef Report is a weekly digital publication focused on the analysis and information of beef and lamb markets. Edited from Montevideo, Uruguay, by TARDÁGUILA Agromercados, centres attention on beef export markets of Mercosur countries (Argentina, Brazil, Paraguay and Uruguay), main world beef exporters.

World Beef Report is edited every Wednesday and goes to whoever pays an annual subscription. It has a Spanish version, called Faxcarne. The report is acquired by meatpackers, traders, brokers, producers, importers, international transport and logistics companies, as well as financial institutions of the whole world. Through both versions, in Spanish and in English, they reach all the continents, though it possesses the major quantity of subscriptions in Latin America (for the version in Spanish, Faxcarne) and Europe (for the version in English, World Beef Report).

== History ==
World Beef Report was first edited in 1995, as the translation of the Spanish Newsletter Faxcarne, that was first edited in 1993 by Uruguayan Seragro.

Since 1995 it was published by Blasina & Tardáguila Consultores Asociados.

It is distributed to subscribers all around the world by email. Since 1999, as the translation of Faxcarne made by Agr. Rafael Tardáguila, it focuses in beef exports from Mercosur countries. Mercosur is since the 2000 decade the main beef exporting region.

In 2010, with the dissolution of Blasina & Tardáguila Consultores Asociados, World Beef Report started to be edited by TARDÁGUILA Agromercados, keeping its production and edition in charge of Rafael Tardáguila.

The publication is one of the main products TARDÁGUILA's Agromercados, company dedicated to the analysis and information of the agricultural markets. TARDÁGUILA Agromercados also publishes Faxlana —regarding wool markets— and Negocios Ganaderos, a digital publication of free distribution relative to the cattle markets in Uruguay.
