= Grubebach =

River in Germany

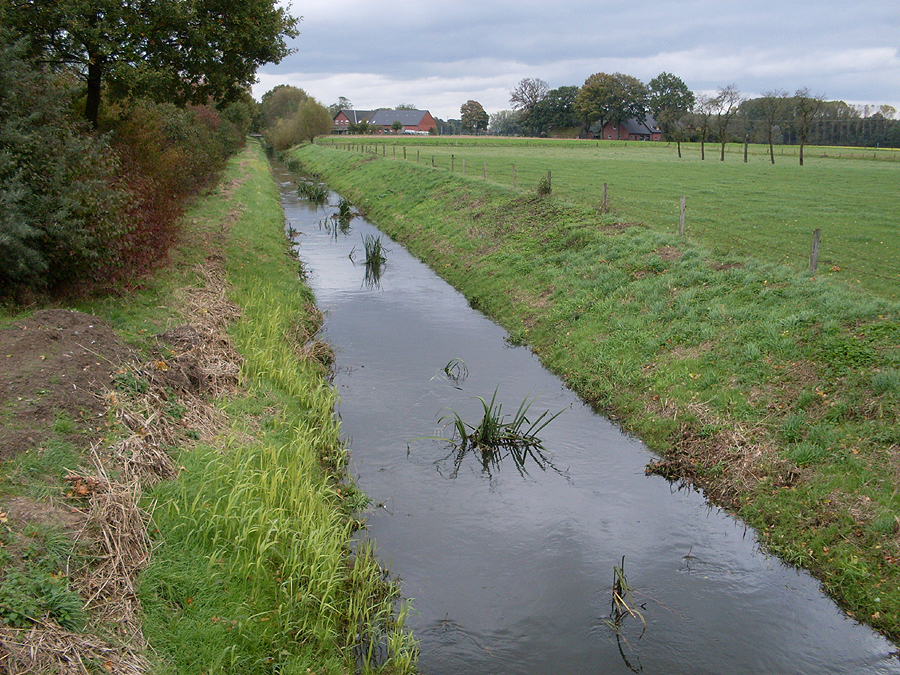

Location
- Country: Germany
- State: North Rhine-Westphalia

Physical characteristics
- Source
  - coordinates: 51°47′57″N 8°37′13″E
- Mouth
  - location: Ems
  - coordinates: 51.8198°N 8.3610°E
- Length: 22.2 km (13.8 mi)

Basin features
- Progression: Ems→ North Sea

Grubebach (in its lower course: Bokel-Mastholter Hauptkanal) is a river of North Rhine-Westphalia, Germany. It flows into the Ems near Rheda-Wiedenbrück.

== See also ==
- List of rivers of North Rhine-Westphalia
