= Jesse Willms =

Canadian entrepreneur and businessman

- Born: Alberta, Canada
- Occupation: Businessman
- Years active: 2003–present

Jesse Willms is a Canadian entrepreneur and businessman who has founded several companies, including eDirect Software, Car History Group, and Just Think Media.

Since 2006, Willms has been involved in several controversies related to his online businesses using negative option billing, a practice in which customers are charged for products or services unless they actively opt out. This practice of negative option billing has resulted in multiple lawsuits against Willms.

== Personal life ==
Willms was born in rural Alberta. His mother, Linda, worked as a revenue property manager, and his father, Dave, owned a welding-equipment company. According to his mother, Willms showed an early interest in business and trade, using his paper route earnings to buy business books and learn about successful entrepreneurs.

Willms' first foray into digital marketing came when he began selling books he had read online.

== Career ==
=== eDirect Software ===
Willms started his first business in 2003. He was only 16 when he began eDirect Software, having "a knack for the internet and turning ideas into reality." Through an online storefront, Willms, along with an assembled staff of a dozen people, sold copies of computer software that he had obtained relatively inexpensively from the Jordanian government. The software sold was mainly copies of Microsoft Office, which eDirect flipped for a profit. Before long, eDirect was one of the largest resellers of Microsoft products on the Internet, first selling on eBay before moving onto its own site.

==== Lawsuit ====
Within two years, in March 2006, Microsoft filed a lawsuit against the then 18-year-old Willms, accusing him of dealing in large amounts of "counterfeit, tampered and/or infringing" copies of Microsoft’s products. Through a court order, Microsoft went through Willms’ PayPal account and discovered that it contained more than $200,000. Microsoft also reviewed eDirect’s software inventories, where they found approximately 66,000 questionable Microsoft products. In February 2007, Willms agreed to a six-figure settlement.

=== Just Think Media ===
Willms started to sell his own white-label product tea under the new company name Just Think Media. The tea was marketed and sold through several websites. The business became such a success that Willms quickly launched other types of alleged health products, such as colon cleansers, teeth whiteners, and acai supplements. The web pages that were used to sell the products were filled with fake "scientific proof" and alleged endorsements from celebrities and TV networks. At its peak in 2009, Just Think Media earned more than $100 million USD in revenue and employed 20 people.

=== Car History Group ===
In 2012, he founded Car History Group. The website has received more than three million visitors.

=== FTC investigation ===
By late 2009, the Federal Trade Commission (FTC) initiated an investigation to scrutinise Willms’ businesses. The impetus for the investigation was that Willms’ companies had, at the time, triggered many complaints from consumers. According to the FTC investigation, the majority of Willms’ profit came from negative option billing, "a practice in which the seller interprets consumers' silence or inaction as permission to charge them". In effect, this meant that consumers signing up for "free trials" of a product were charged with extra fees hidden in the fine print of the terms and conditions. Often consumers first became aware of this after their credit cards had been charged. Also, several different company names appeared on their statements of account, each with a charge of an uneven dollar amount. The FTC claimed that these charges made up the majority of Willms' profits because consumers believed they were legitimate.

==== Lawsuit ====
In May 2011, after an 18-month investigation, the FTC filed a lawsuit against Willms. The lawsuit claimed that Willms, from 2007 to 2011, had conned approximately $467 million from customers in the U.S., Canada, Australia, the UK, and New Zealand. In September 2011, a U.S. District Court Judge froze Willms' assets and prohibited him from continuing to sell products through negative-option billing. In early 2012, Willms acquiesced to a $359 million settlement. As part of the settlement, Willms also agreed to sell off personal property, including his mansion.

== See also ==
- One weird trick advertisements
