= Branch house (building) =

Meat warehouse marketplace

A branch house was a meat industry building that combined a sales office and warehouse for the disposition of packing-house products at a distance from the packing plant. Branch houses were typically located in densely populated areas, and received meat shipments from the slaughterhouse, often daily by rail. Some branch houses would do further processing, including smoked meats, and sausage making.

In the 1940s, as the American highway system began to expand, the importance of branch houses in meat retail was overtaken by meat jobbers.

== See also ==
- Ice house
- Meat broker
- Meat jobber
