= Vion NV =

European food producer

Vion Food Group
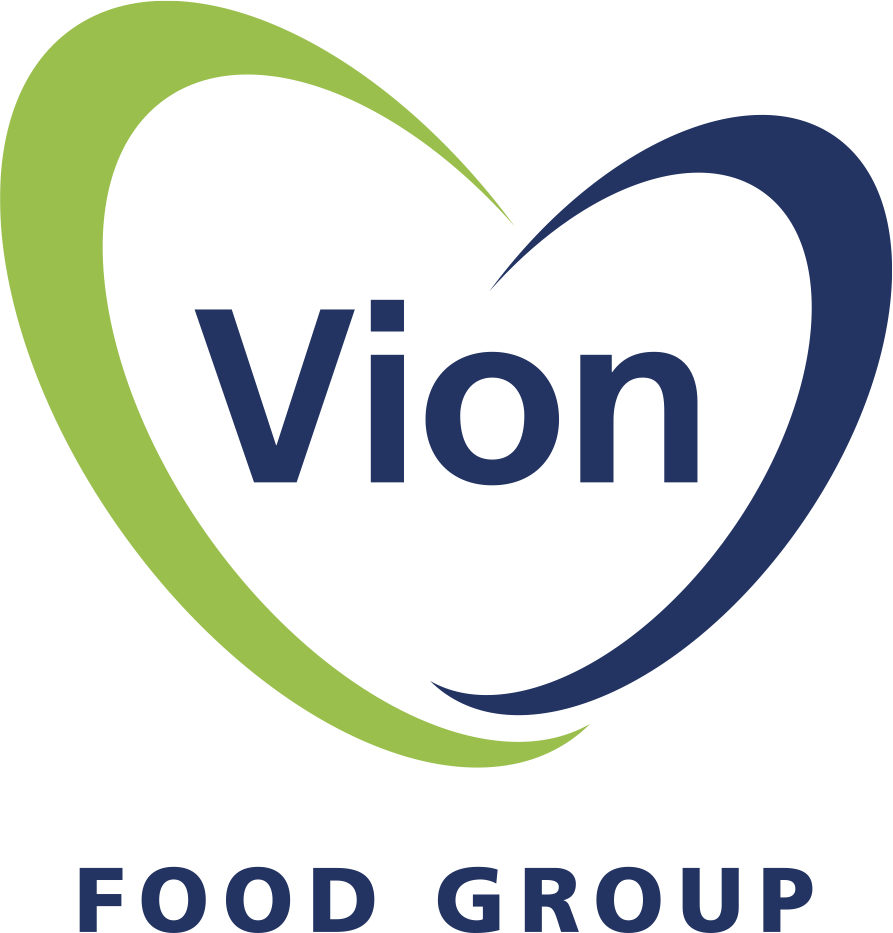
- Industry: Meat and Food industry
- Founded: 1934; 92 years ago
- Headquarters: Boxtel, Netherlands
- Products: pork, beef, meat alternatives, semi-finished products
- Revenue: €4.6 billion (2021)
- Operating income: (€ 35) million loss
- Net income: (€ 29) million loss
- Number of employees: 12,281 (2021) FTE whereof 4,307 flex workers
- Website: www.vionfoodgroup.com

Vion N.V. is an internationally operating company of the meat and food industry with headquarters in Boxtel, Netherlands. It is among the largest meat producers in Europe, with production sites in the Netherlands, Germany and Belgium. In 2021, the company had a revenue of €4.6 billion.

== Ownership ==
Vion is legally organized as Naamloze vennootschap (N.V.). Vion's sole shareholder is Stichting Administratiekantoor SBT (SBT). SBT issued depositary receipts for its shares, which are all held by Noordbrabantse Christelijke Boerenbond, Rooms-Katholieke Vereniging van Boeren en Tuinders-Ontwikkeling (NCB-Ontwikkeling). NCB-Ontwikkeling in turn acts as the investment fund of Zuidelijke Land- en Tuinbouworganisatie (ZLTO), an agricultural association with approximately 15,000 members.

== History ==
The company originated in 1934, when the Noordbrabantse Christelijke Boerenbond (NCB), now known as ZLTO, founded the company Destructor NCB for processing animal carcasses of the farmers of the NCB.

In the 1980s, the company expanded via takeovers. In the 1990s, it entered the market for value-added products, mainly gelatin. It was renamed to Sobel N.V.

In 2002, ZLTO decided to enter the meat industry. Therefore, the ZTLO additionally founded the Bestmeat Company N.V. and brought it together with Sobel into the new holding company Best Agrifund N.V.

The first takeover in the meat industry was the leading German meat company Moksel in early 2003. Following, the company took over the leading Dutch meat company Dumeco in mid-2003, and Norddeutsche Fleischzentrale (NFZ, Nordfleisch) in the end of 2003. In 2004, Hendrix Meat was bought from Nutreco Holding N.V. and in 2005 the German company Südfleisch was taken over.

In 2004, the holding company was renamed from Best Agrifund N.V. to Sovion N.V. In July 2006, the company was again renamed from Sovion to VION Food Group. The sales of Vion grewing from mere €760 million in 2002 to more than €7 billion euro in 2007.

In 2008, Vion acquired the lamb and poultry company Grampian Country Food Group Ltd based in Scotland for more than €400 million and, in 2010, the Dutch cattle slaughtering company Weyl Beef.

In 2012, Vion sold her British pork operation to the 2 Sisters Food Group to focus on their Dutch and German operations. In 2019 it announced to close the factory in Valkenswaard and redistribute staff and products to other factories in Netherland and Germany.

== Structure ==
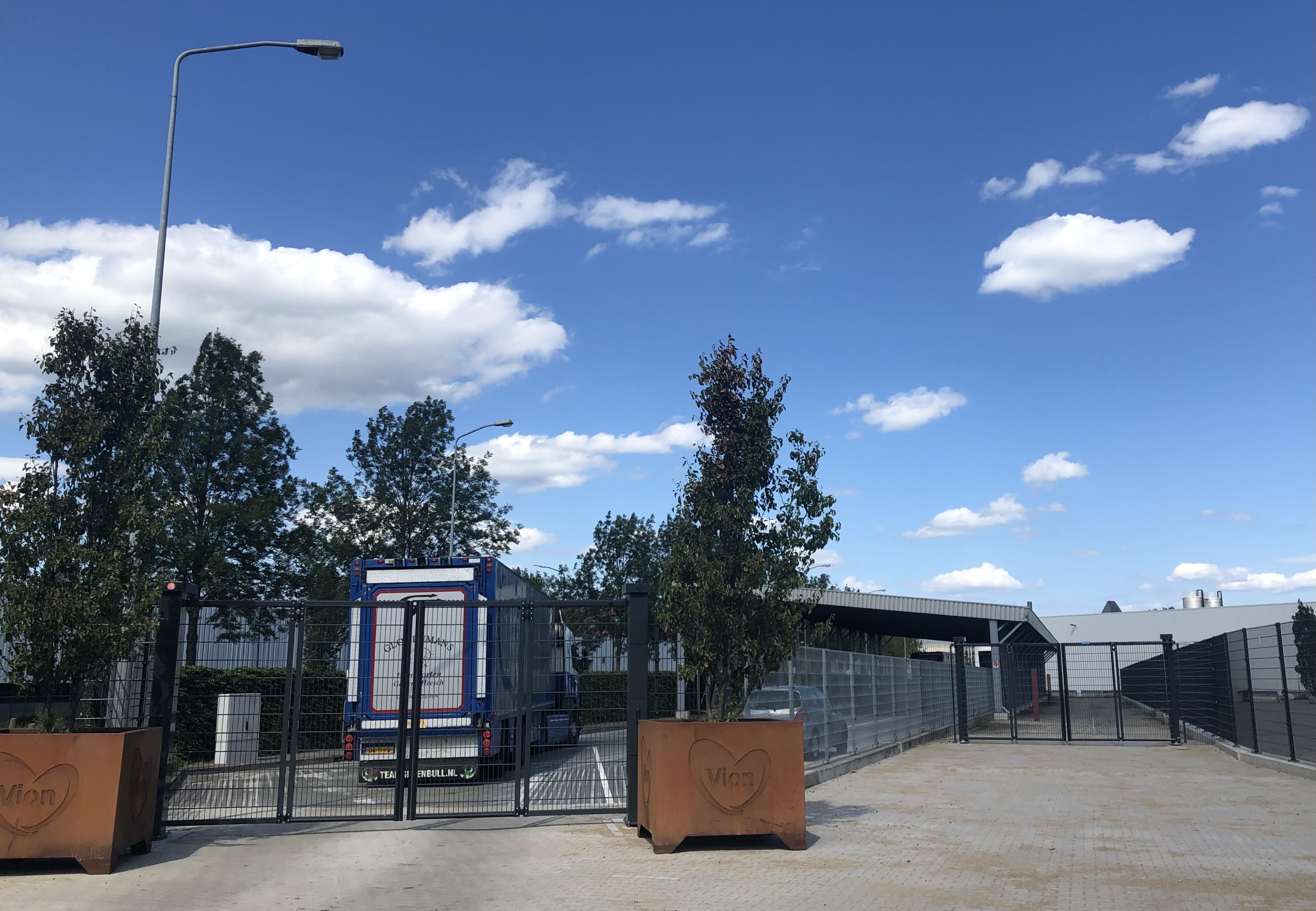
Vion slaughterhouse in Boxtel

Vion is divided into four business units pork, beef, food service and retail. The company has production and sales locations on all continents.

The business unit pork comprises 12 production facilities for pigs, four of which are in the Netherlands and eight in Germany. Vion slaughters 15 million pigs annually in total. Vion's largest pig slaughterhouse is located in Boxtel with a daily slaughtering capacity of 20,000 pigs.

The business unit beef builds upon the annual slaughtering of almost 1 million cows.

== Products ==
The product portfolio of Vion's core activities comprises fresh pork and beef, a diverse range of convenience food products and a range of vegetarian consumer products. Vion supplies products to more than 100 million consumers daily. 37% of the produced meat is exported.

== Controversies ==
Vion was repeatedly criticized for exploitation of workers. In 2020, there were multiple corona hotspots among meat workers in Vion facilities and the company was criticized for bad living conditions of the workers.
