= Federal Cartel Office =

National competition regulator of Germany

Coordinates: 50°43′21″N 7°07′00″E

- Bundeskartellamt — BKartA —

Federal agency overview
- Formed: 1 January 1958
- Headquarters: Bonn, North Rhine-Westphalia
- Motto: open markets | fair competition
- Employees: 402
- Federal agency executive: Andreas Mundt
- Parent department: Federal Ministry for Economic Affairs and Energy
- Website: bundeskartellamt.de/EN

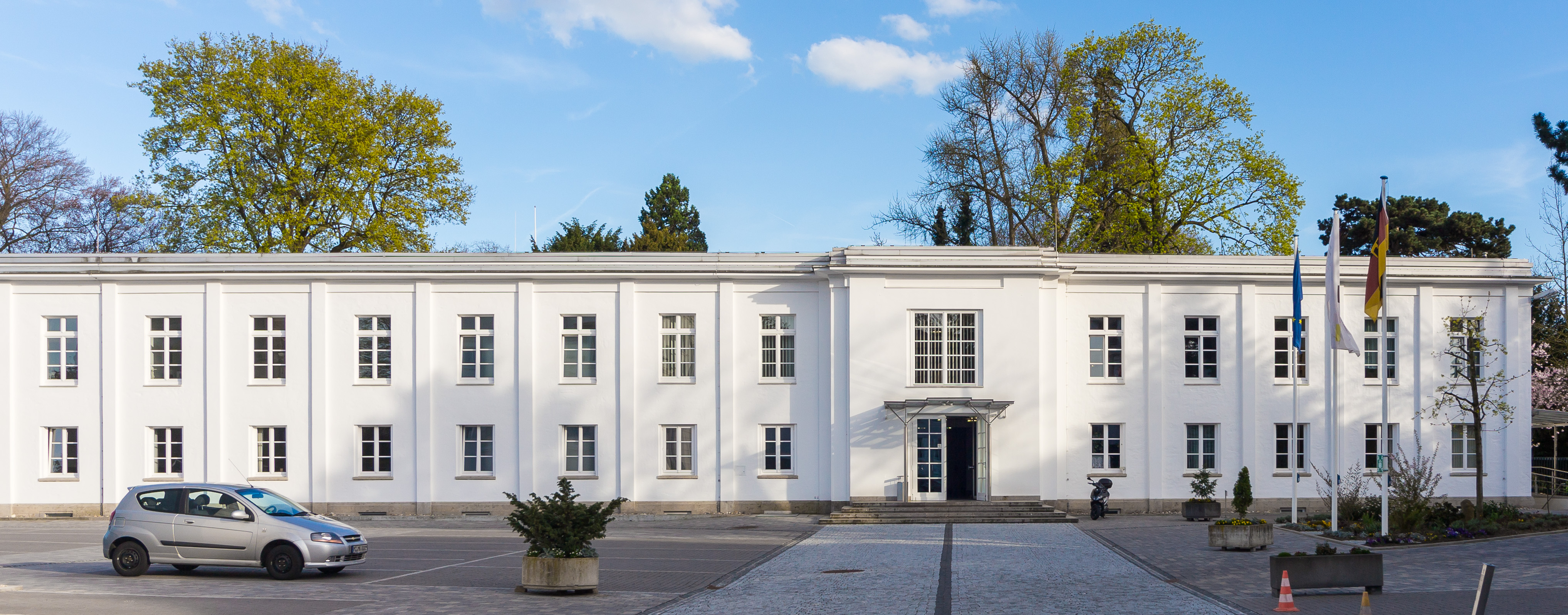
The Bundeskartellamt in Bonn

The Federal Cartel Office (German: Bundeskartellamt, German pronunciation: [bʊndəskaʁˈtɛlˌʔamt]; BKartA) is Germany's national competition regulatory agency. First established in 1958, BKartA comes under the authority of the Federal Ministry for Economic Affairs and Energy. The agency is headquartered in Bonn, the former capital of West Germany. Since 2009, Andreas Mundt has served as the president of BKartA.
