= Rheda-Wiedenbrück =

- Town
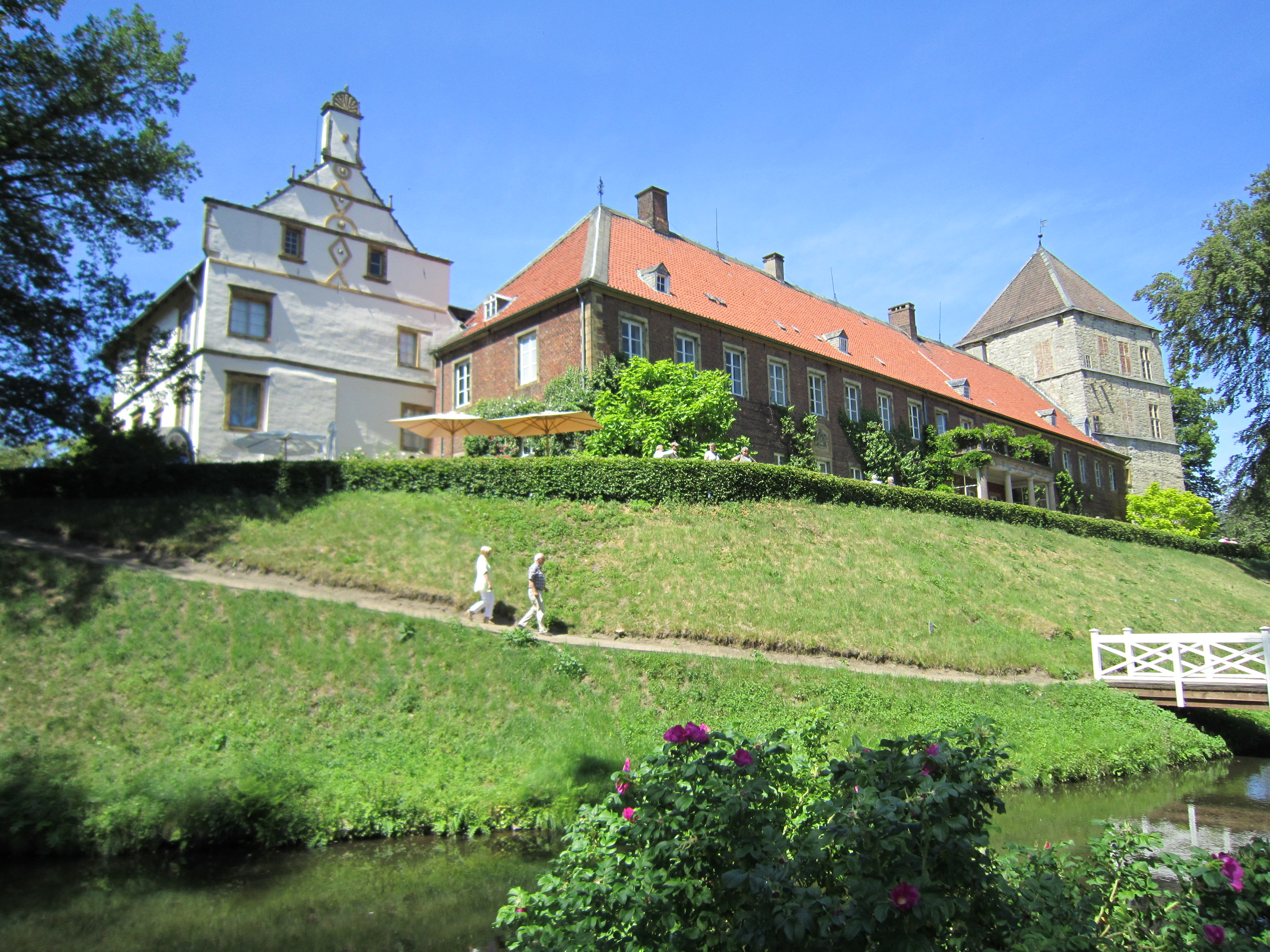
- Schloss Rheda

- Flag Coat of arms

- Location of Rheda-Wiedenbrück within Gütersloh district
- Interactive map of Rheda-Wiedenbrück
- Location within Germany Location within North Rhine-Westphalia
- Coordinates: 51°50′30″N 8°18′00″E
- Country: Germany
- State: North Rhine-Westphalia
- Admin. region: Detmold
- District: Gütersloh
- Subdivisions: 6

Government
  - Mayor (2020–25): Theo Mettenborg (CDU)

Area
  - Total: 86.72 km^{2} (33.48 sq mi)
- Elevation: 66–105 m (217–344 ft)

Population (2025-12-31)
  - Total: 47,935
  - Density: 552.8/km^{2} (1,432/sq mi)
- Time zone: UTC+01:00 (CET)
  - Summer (DST): UTC+02:00 (CEST)
- Postal codes: 33378
- Dialling codes: 05242
- Vehicle registration: GT
- Website: rheda-wiedenbrueck.de

Rheda-Wiedenbrück (German pronunciation: [ˈʁeːda viːdn̩ˈbʁʏk]; Westphalian: Raie-Wienbrügge) is a city in the district of Gütersloh, in North Rhine-Westphalia, Germany.

== Geography ==
The twin community lies within the valley of the river Ems in the Westphalian Lowland south of the Teutoburg Forest, which is about 30 km away. The formerly independent towns of Rheda and Wiedenbrück are separated by the Federal Highway 2 which does not, however, form the historic border between the two districts. The Ems river runs through the city. The nearest major cities are Gütersloh (about 11 km), Bielefeld and Paderborn around 35 km away, and Hamm about 55 km away. The river enters from the southeast into an urban area. Close to the public pool in Wiedenbrück, an artificial side arm branches off to the north of the river Ems. The Ems and the artificial branch are flowing around the old historic Wiedenbrück city centre and come together again behind the Ems lake at the height of the Wiedenbrück High School. The river then flows through the grounds of the State Garden Show 1988, connects the Wiedenbrücker center with the center of Rheda and leaves the urban area in the northernmost tip. Several small tributaries of the Ems are located in the municipality. Other notable waters are the Buxelssee northeast of the motorway, the Bänischsee northeast of Rheda and Lintel lake east of Wiedenbrück. One characteristic of the two combined cities is a green strip several kilometers long along the Ems, starting at Emssee in downtown Wiedenbrück and ending near the water castle in Rheda. The overall flat terrain falls from south to north. Outside the settlement areas, the city is dominated by agriculture and the city has comparatively large forest areas surrounding the city.

=== Expanse and utilisation of city area ===
The city, which is classified as a small center city municipality has an area of 86.68 km². The majority consists of agricultural and forest area, a combined 72%. The greatest distance from north to south is 12.6 km, from east to west about 14 km.

Area by type
Agriculture	Forest	Buildings, Free Space, Commercial	Traffic, Roads	Water	Recreation, Cemeteries	Others	Total Area
50.08 km²	12.29 km²	14.50 km²	6.88 km²	1.63 km²	0.96 km²	0.35 km²	86.68 km²
57.8%	14.2%	16.7%	7.9%	1.9%	1.1%	0.3%	100.0 %

The length of the city border is 50,2 km, the highest elevation at 105m and the lowest point at 66m above mean sea level.

=== Neighbouring municipalities ===
- Oelde
- Herzebrock-Clarholz
- Gütersloh
- Rietberg
- Langenberg

=== Division and organisation ===
Rheda-Wiedenbrück is divided according to § 3 of the main articles of association in the city itself and the three villages Batenhorst, Lintel and St. Vit. Before 1 October 2004 the neighbourhood Nordrheda-Ems also was classified as a village, but was then merged with Rheda. The following table shows the numbers of inhabitants and areas of the towns and city areas as of 1 January 2013.

Village / Part	Inhabitants	Area	Map of city areas
Batenhorst	1,492	16.90 km²	centered
Lintel	1,510	21.75 km²	centered
Rheda	22,099 incl. Nordrheda-Ems	27.06 km²	centered
(Nordrheda-Ems)	(not listed)	(13.95 km²)	centered
St. Vit	1,370	10.37 km²	centered
Wiedenbrück	21,252	10.57 km²	centered
Total	47,723	86.66 km²	

== History ==
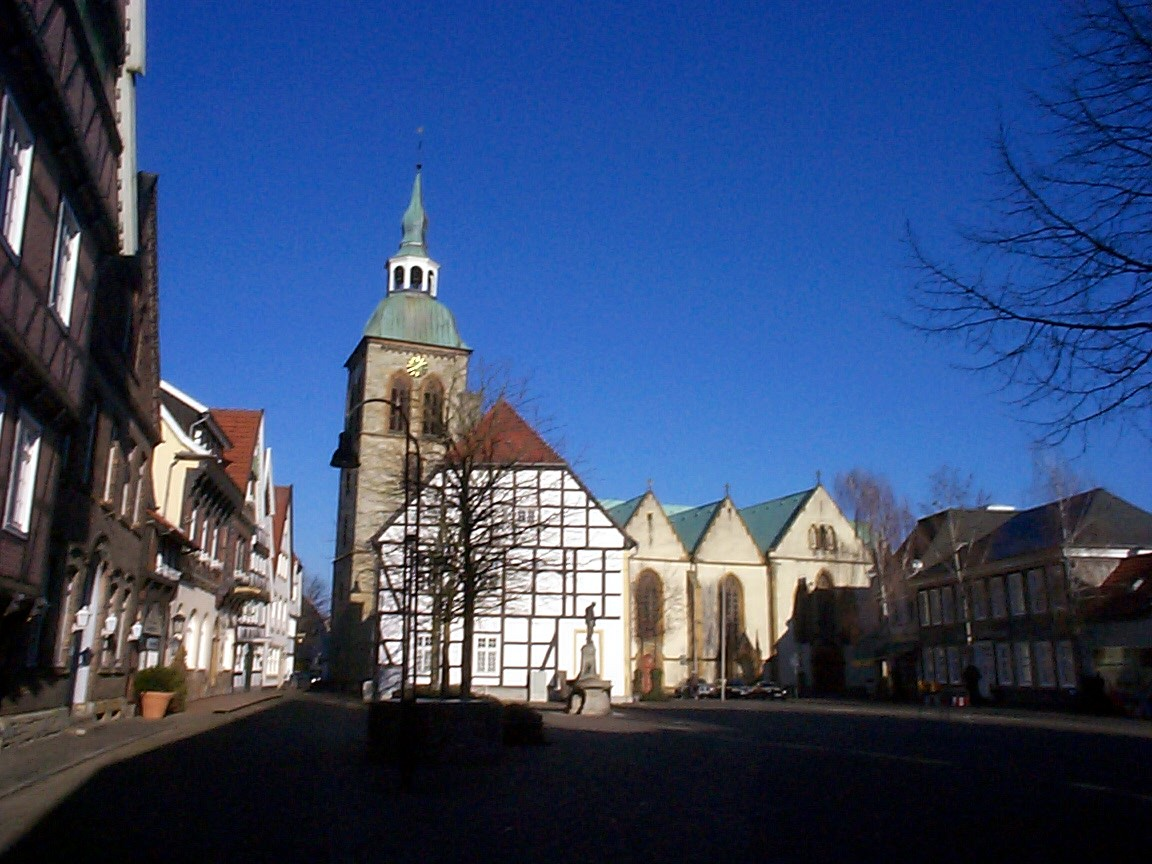
Wiedenbrück market square

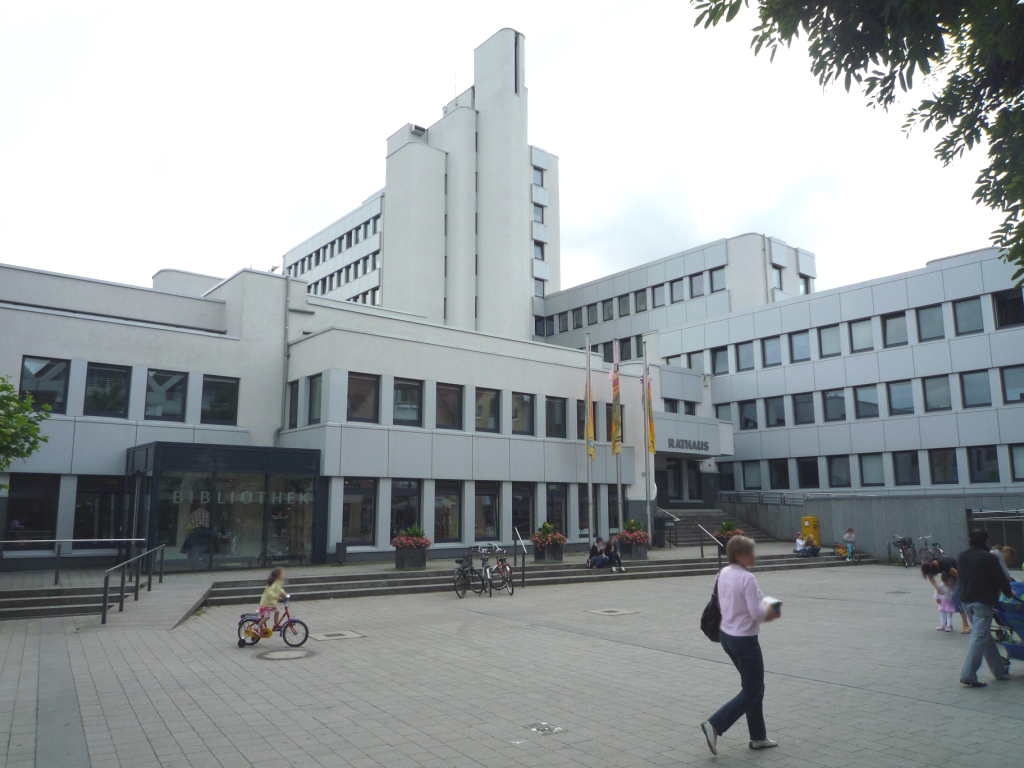
Renovated city hall in Rheda

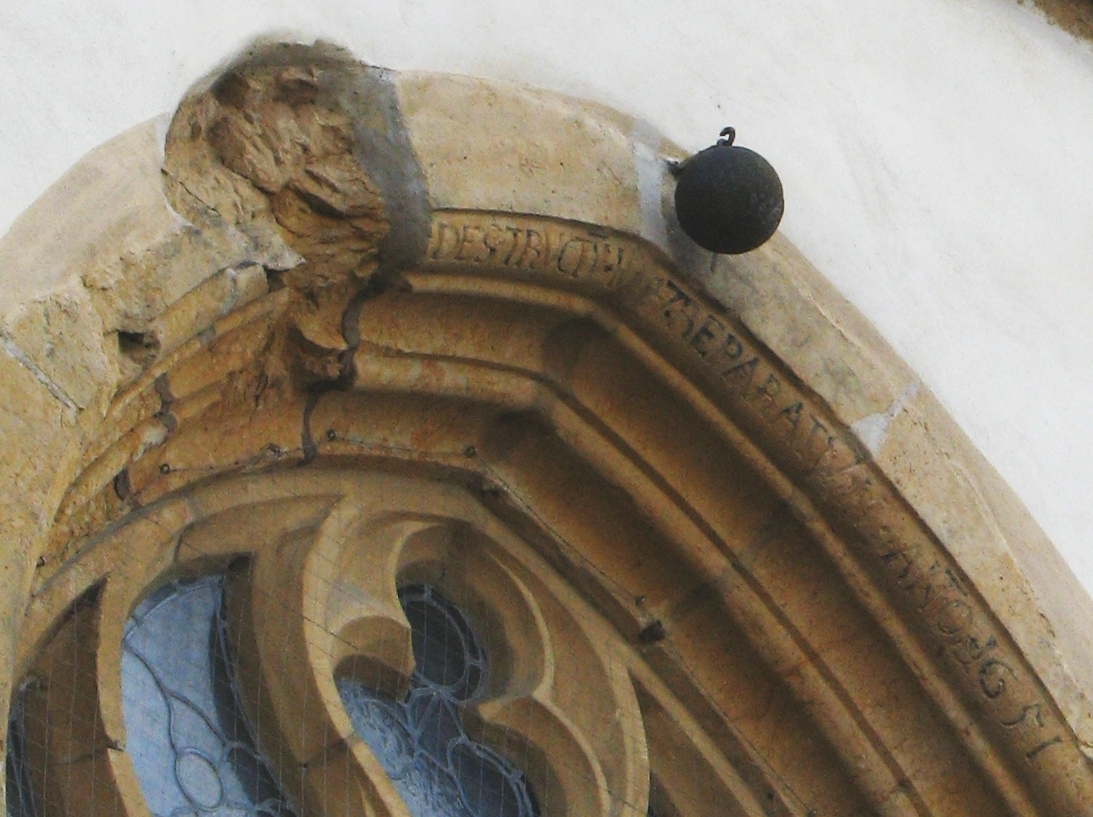
Bullet damage from the Thirty Years' War at Saint Aegidius church

It is suspected that in 785 a first small church was built in Wiedenbrück. Excavations show the emergence of a transept basilica built after 900. The dendrochronological analysis of two tree coffins found north of the Saint Aegidius church resulted in a dating to the years 907/923 and 926/42. Rheda was documented at the latest in 1088 and earliest in 1085. Since its first mentioning in 1170 until 1807/1815, the castle or the later Rheda Castle was the center of the Rheda ruling region (the County of Bentheim-Tecklenburg-Rheda). Wiedenbrück was the seat of the Office Reckenberg and thus an exclave of the Bishopric of Osnabrück.

Emperor Otto granted the rights of market, coin and customs law for Wiedenbrück to the bishop of Osnabrück in the year 952. Several certificates issued by Otto III (HRE) in Wiedenbrück in 985 are known. It is therefore assumed that a royal court existed in Wiedenbrück at that time.

In 1225 bishop Engelbert of Osnabrück took over the ancient legal court responsibility for Wiedenbrück and other cities. This is one of the starting points of the development of the Bishopric of Osnabrück to a territorial state of the Bishop of Osnabrück. The oldest surviving coins from Wiedenbrück are dated 1230. In 1231 Wiedenbrück was proclaimed civitas. Aldermen were elected to the Court and a seal was announced. In 1249 the new town was founded and a year later castle Reckenberg was mentioned for the first time.

Around 1462 a first constitution was drafted, based on the constitution of Osnabrück. In 1543 Wiedenbrück was reformed by Hermann Bonnus, a representative of the Bishop Franz of Waldeck. By 1565 Wiedenbrück was predominantly Lutheran. In the same year the boundaries between the Office Reckenberg to which Wiedenbrück counted, and the adjacent Rheda were established in the so-called Bielefeld recess, as two independent sovereign areas were first recognized. After first steps for a Counter-Reformation were taken in 1624/1625, Wiedenbrück was occupied in 1626 during the Thirty Years' War by the Danes . When the Bishop Franz Wilhelm von Wartenberg assumed office in 1628, he continued the Counter-Reformation. In 1637 Wiedenbrück established one of the oldest high schools in the region, the Gymnasium Marianum, a Latin School and forerunner of the current Ratsgymnasium high school in Wiedenbrück. The Franciscan monastery was founded in 1644 by Bishop Franz Wilhelm. Three years later, in July 1647 Wiedenbrück was taken by the Swedes, but cleared after dismantling of the fortress within two months. When in 1648 in Münster and Osnabrück the Peace of Westphalia was negotiated, this did require the alternation of a Catholic and a Lutheran bishop in the House of Brunswick-Lüneburg for the Bishopric of Osnabrück. In 1664, prompted by Ernst August I., the refortification of the city began. In 1716 the last urban copper coins were minted. In 1726, a new office building was constructed on the Reckenberg. As a result of the conversion of bishopric Osnabrück into a principality, Wiedenbrück was attached to the house of Hanover in 1802. In 1807 the city became part of the Kingdom of Westphalia. The chapter of fellows of collegiate was disbanded in 1810, and the Office Reckenberg with Wiedenbrück were ceded to Prussia at the Congress of Vienna in 1816 and assigned to the new province of Westphalia. Wiedenbrück thus separated from the Diocese of Osnabrück, the Catholic communities of the former Office Reckenberg came to the Archdiocese of Paderborn.

In the early morning hours of 10 November 1938 members of the SA, who had previously gathered in the adjacent restaurant Neuhaus, set the Rheda synagogue on fire. The remains were demolished and the property subsequently sold. In 1938 the federal highway A2 was opened to traffic. The highway was not, as is sometimes falsely claimed built almost exactly on the border between Rheda Wiedenbrück, but crosses it several times in different city areas. In 1940, Field Marshal Hermann Goering ordered the confiscation of all bronze church bells, which were to be used for arms manufacturing. From 1816 until the local government reform in 1970, the city was the seat of the district named after the city of Wiedenbrück.

== Religions ==
Of the 47,723 inhabitants (as of 1 January 2013), a total of 23,428 or about 49.1% are of Roman Catholic faith. Rheda-Wiedenbrück belongs to the Archdiocese of Paderborn. 10,274 inhabitants, or about 21.6% are Protestant faith. These believers are part of the church district of Gütersloh in the Evangelical Church of Westphalia. The remaining 10,802 inhabitants or 23.6%, have a different creed or religious affiliation. Because the district of Gütersloh is a stronghold of the Assyrian people living in Germany, the city has a relatively high share of members of the Syriac Orthodox Church.

== Population history ==
Historical population

Year	Pop.	±% p.a.
1939	18,014	—
1950	26,702	+3.64%
1961	32,214	+1.72%
1965	35,103	+2.17%
1970	36,943	+1.03%
1975	37,365	+0.23%
1980	37,945	+0.31%
1985	37,538	−0.22%

Year	Pop.	±% p.a.
1990	38,327	+0.42%
1995	42,155	+1.92%
2000	44,932	+1.28%
2005	46,440	+0.66%
2010	47,316	+0.37%
2015	48,000	+0.29%
2020	48,672	+0.28%
2025	47,935	−0.30%

Source: Statistisches Landesamt Nordrhein-Westfalen (1939-1961) and Landesdatabank Nordrhein-Westfalen (1965-2025)

== Economy ==
The Tönnies Holding has its headquarters in Rheda-Wiedenbrück and operates the largest pork plant in Germany there.

== Twin towns – sister cities ==
Rheda-Wiedenbrück is twinned with:

- Adjengré, Togo
- Aouda, Togo
- Oldenzaal, Netherlands
- Palamós, Spain

== Notable people ==
- Martin Harlinghausen (1902–1986), general
- Liz Mohn (born 1941), businesswoman and philanthropist
- André Kuper (born 1960), German politician (CDU)
- Tim Krohn (born 1965), Swiss writer
- Hanne Wolharn (born 1968), actress
- Ingo Pohlmann (born 1972), pop musician
- Nicole Kortlüke (born 1974), film editor
- Tobias Böckers (born 1964), anatomist and neuroscientist
- Markus Siegenhort, metal musician
- Ulrich von Zons (born 1968), politician
- Katja Urbatsch (born 1979), CEO and co-founder of the non-profit organization ArbeiterKind.de

=== Associated with the town ===
- Luise Hensel (1798–1876), poet, lived for more than 20 years in Wiedenbrück
- Bernhard Hoetger (1874–1949), artist, lived in Wiedenbrück for a short time
- Luigi Colani (1928–2019), designer, lived temporarily in Rheda
- Judith Lefeber (born 1981), singer, grew up in Rheda-Wiedenbrück
