= Outline of agricultural science =

Field that studies and improves upon the cultivation of plants and animals

The following outline is provided as an overview of and topical guide to agricultural science:

Agricultural science (or agriscience for short) is a broad multidisciplinary field of biology that encompasses the parts of exact, natural, economic and social sciences that are used in the practice and understanding of agriculture. Professionals of the agricultural science are called agricultural scientists or agriculturists.

== What type of thing is agricultural science? ==
Agricultural science can be described as all of the following:

- an academic discipline – branch of knowledge. It incorporates expertise, people, projects, communities, challenges, studies, inquiry, and research areas that are strongly associated with a given scholastic subject area or college department.
- branch of science – systematic enterprise that builds and organizes knowledge in the form of testable explanations and predictions about the universe.
  - branch of natural science – branch of science concerned with the description, prediction, and understanding of natural phenomena, based on observational and empirical evidence.
    - branch of biology – natural science concerned with the study of life and living organisms, including their structure, function, growth, evolution, distribution, identification and taxonomy.
  - branch of applied science – discipline of science that applies existing scientific knowledge to develop more practical applications, like technology or inventions.
    - branch of agriculture – cultivation and breeding of animals, plants and fungi for food, fiber, biofuel, medicinal plants and other products used to sustain and enhance human life.

== Areas of research and development in agricultural science ==
- Agricultural systems
  - Aeroponics
  - Aquaponics
  - Agroforestry
  - Biointensive agriculture
  - Building-integrated agriculture
  - Climate-smart agriculture
  - Dryland farming
  - Foodscaping
  - Industrial agriculture
  - Intensive farming
    - Intensive animal farming
  - Organic farming
  - Permaculture
  - Polyculture
  - Regenerative agriculture
  - Slash-and-burn agriculture
  - Subsistence agriculture
  - Sustainable agriculture – subsistence agriculture, also known as traditional agricultural systems, feed most of the poorest people in the world. These systems are of interest as they sometimes retain a level of integration with natural ecological systems greater than that of industrial agriculture, which may be more sustainable than some modern agricultural systems.
  - Urban agriculture
  - Vertical farming
- Production techniques (e.g., irrigation management, recommended nitrogen inputs)* Improving agricultural productivity in terms of quantity and quality (e.g., selection of drought-resistant crops and animals, development of new pesticides, yield-sensing technologies, simulation models of crop growth, in-vitro cell culture techniques)* Minimizing the effects of pests (weeds, insects, pathogens, nematodes) on crop or animal production systems.
- Transformation of primary products into end-consumer products (e.g., production, preservation, and packaging of dairy products)
- Prevention and correction of adverse environmental effects (e.g., soil degradation, waste management, bioremediation)
- Theoretical production ecology, relating to crop production modeling
- Food production and demand on a global basis, with special attention paid to the major producers, such as China, India, Brazil, the USA and the EU.
- Various sciences relating to agricultural resources and the environment (e.g. soil science, agroclimatology); biology of agricultural crops and animals (e.g. crop science, animal science and their included sciences, e.g. ruminant nutrition, farm animal welfare); such fields as agricultural economics and rural sociology; various disciplines encompassed in agricultural engineering.

== Branches of agricultural science ==
- Agricultural biotechnology – studies ways to use scientific tools and techniques, including genetic engineering, molecular markers, molecular diagnostics, vaccines, and tissue culture, to modify living organisms: plants, animals, and microorganisms.
- Agronomy –
- Horticulture –
- Soil science –
- Animal husbandry –
- Agricultural engineering –
- Agricultural economics –
- Plant pathology –
- Entomology –

== History of agricultural science ==
History of agricultural science

- History of fertilizer – Egyptians, Romans, Babylonians, and early Germans all are recorded as using minerals and/or manure to enhance the productivity of their farms. The use of wood ash as a field treatment became widespread. Today, the main form of fertilizer used globally is manufactured using the Haber process and the Ostwald process.
- History of genetics
  - History of Mendelian inheritance

== Agricultural science organizations ==
- List of agricultural universities and colleges

== Persons influential in agricultural science ==
- Wilbur Olin Atwater
- Robert Bakewell
- Norman Borlaug
- Luther Burbank
- George Washington Carver
- Carl Henry Clerk
- George C. Clerk
- René Dumont
- Sir Albert Howard
- Kailas Nath Kaul
- Thomas Lecky
- Justus von Liebig
- Jay Laurence Lush
- Gregor Mendel
- Louis Pasteur
- M. S. Swaminathan
- Jethro Tull
- Artturi Ilmari Virtanen
- Sewall Wright

== See also ==
- Outline of agriculture
- Globally Important Agricultural Heritage Systems
- Agricultural Research Council
- Agricultural sciences basic topics
- Agriculture ministry
- Agroecology
- American Society of Agronomy
- Consultative Group on International Agricultural Research (CGIAR)
- Crop Science Society of America
- Farm management
- Genomics of domestication
- History of agricultural science
- Indian Council of Agricultural Research
- Institute of Food and Agricultural Sciences
- International Assessment of Agricultural Science and Technology for Development
- International Food Policy Research Institute, IFPRI
- International Institute of Tropical Agriculture
- International Livestock Research Institute
- List of agriculture topics
- National Agricultural Library (NAL)
- National FFA Organization
- Research Institute of Crop Production (RICP) (in the Czech Republic)
- Soil Science Society of America
- USDA Agricultural Research Service
- University of Agricultural Sciences
