= Outline of agriculture =

Overview of and topical guide to agriculture

The following outline is provided as an overview of and topical guide to agriculture:

Agriculture – cultivation of animals, plants, fungi and other life forms for food, fiber, and other products used to sustain life.

== What type of thing is agriculture? ==
Agriculture can be described as all of the following:

- A type of work
- An academic discipline
- A science
  - An applied science
- An industry

=== Agricultural activities ===
- Agricultural cycle – annual cycle of activities related to the growth and harvest of a crop.
- Land use – management and modification of natural environment or wilderness into built environment such as fields, pastures, and settlements.

=== Agricultural production ===
- Cash crop – agricultural crop which is grown for sale for profit.
- Agricultural products
  - Food – any substance consumed to provide nutritional support for the body.
  - Natural fibers – class of hair-like materials that are continuous filaments or are in discrete elongated pieces, similar to pieces of thread. They can be spun into filaments, thread, or rope. Natural fibers are made from plant, animal and mineral sources.
  - Lumber – wood in any of its stages from felling to readiness for use as structural material for construction, or wood pulp for paper production.
  - Paper – sheet material used for writing on or printing on (or as a non-waterproof container), usually made by draining cellulose fibres from a suspension in water.
  - Medicine great quantity of herbal and animal parts are used for medicinal purposes worldwide, especially in traditional and naturopathic medicines.
  - Biofuels wide range of plants and plant products are used for converting to fuels, such as firewood, biodiesel, methane gas etc.

=== Agricultural resources ===
- Agricultural land – denotes the land suitable for agricultural production, both crops and livestock. It is one of the main resources in agriculture.
- Labor (economics) – measure of the work done by human beings.
- Water – chemical substance with the chemical formula H_{2}O.
- Agricultural machinery – machinery used in the operation of an agricultural area or farm.
- Fertilizers – any organic or inorganic material of natural or synthetic origin (other than liming materials) that is added to a soil to supply one or more plant nutrients essential to the growth of plants.

== Branches of agriculture ==
=== By type of life form produced or harvested ===
- Agronomy – science and technology of producing and using plants for food, fuel, feed, fiber, and reclamation.
  - Organic gardening – science and art of growing fruits, vegetables, flowers, or ornamental plants by following the essential principles of organic agriculture in soil building and conservation, pest management, and heirloom variety preservation.
- Animal husbandry – agricultural practice of breeding and raising livestock.

=== By industry ===
==== Aquafarming ====
- Aquaculture – farming of aquatic organisms such as fish, crustaceans, molluscs and aquatic plants.
- Mariculture – specialized branch of aquaculture involving the cultivation of marine organisms for food and other products in the open ocean, an enclosed section of the ocean, or in tanks, ponds or raceways which are filled with seawater.

==== Farming ====
===== Types of farming =====
- Alligator farming – establishment for breeding and raising of crocodilians in order to produce meat, leather, and other goods.
- Aquaculture – farming of aquatic organisms such as fish, crustaceans, molluscs and aquatic plants.
- Contract farming – agricultural production carried out according to an agreement between a buyer and farmers
- Dairy farming – class of agricultural, or an animal husbandry, enterprise, for long-term production of milk, usually from dairy cows but also from goats and sheep, which may be either processed on-site or transported to a dairy factory for processing and eventual retail sale.
- Integrated farming – more integrated approach to farming as compared to existing monoculture approaches. It refers to agricultural systems that integrate livestock and crop production and may sometimes be known as Integrated Biosystems.
- Orchardry – managing orchards, intentional planting of trees or shrubs that are maintained for food production. Orchards comprise fruit or nut-producing trees which are grown for commercial production.
- Organic farming – form of agriculture that relies on techniques such as crop rotation, green manure, compost and biological pest control.
- Pig farming –
- Poultry farming
- Sericulture – silk farming, the rearing of silkworms for the production of raw silk.
- Sheep husbandry – specifically dealing with the raising and breeding of domestic sheep.
- Viticulture – the cultivation and harvesting of grapes.

===== Farming facilities =====
- Crops – non-animal species or variety that is grown to be harvested as food, livestock fodder, fuel or for any other economic purpose.
  - Orchard – intentional planting of trees or shrubs that is maintained for food production.
- Farm – an area of land, together with the buildings on it, that is used for growing crops or raising animals, usually in order to sell them.
- Greenhouse – building in which plants are grown.

===== Farming equipment =====
Farm equipment – any kind of machinery used on a farm to help with farming.

- Baler – piece of farm machinery used to compress a cut and raked crop (such as hay, cotton, straw, or silage) into compact bales that are easy to handle, transport and store.
- Combine harvester – or simply combine, is a machine that harvests grain crops.
- Farm tractor – vehicle specifically designed to deliver a high tractive effort (or torque) at slow speeds, for the purposes of hauling a trailer or machinery used in agriculture or construction.
- Manure spreader used to distribute manure over a field as a fertilizer.
- Mower – machine for cutting grass or other plants that grow on the ground. Usually mowing is distinguished from reaping, which uses similar implements, but is the traditional term for harvesting grain crops, e.g. with reapers and combines.
- Pickup truck – is a light motor vehicle with an open-top rear cargo area (bed).
- Plough – is a tool (or machine) used in farming for initial cultivation of soil in preparation for sowing seed or planting. It has been a basic instrument for most of recorded history, and represents one of the major advances in agriculture.

===== Farming products =====
- Livestock – domesticated animals raised in an agricultural setting to produce commodities such as food, fiber and labor. The term "livestock" as used in this article does not include poultry or farmed fish; however the inclusion of these, especially poultry, within the meaning of "livestock" is common.
  - Cattle – most common type of large domesticated ungulates.
  - Pigs – any of the animals in the genus Sus.
  - Poultry – category of domesticated birds kept by humans for the purpose of collecting their eggs, or killing for their meat and/or feathers.
  - Sheep – are quadrupedal, ruminant mammals typically kept as livestock.
- Produce – farm-produced goods, not limited to fruits and vegetables (i.e. meats, grains, oats, etc.).
  - Grains – grasses (members of the monocot family Poaceae, also known as Gramineae) cultivated for the edible components of their grain (botanically, a type of fruit called a caryopsis), composed of the endosperm, germ, and bran.
  - Fruits – part of a flowering plant that derives from specific tissues of the flower, mainly one or more ovaries.
  - Legumes – plant in the family Fabaceae (or Leguminosae), or a fruit of these specific plants. A legume fruit is a simple dry fruit that develops from a simple carpel and usually dehisces (opens along a seam) on two sides.
  - Nut (fruit)s – hard-shelled indehiscent fruit of some plants. While a wide variety of dried seeds and fruits are called nuts in English, only a certain number of them are considered by biologists to be true nuts.
  - Vegetables – edible plant or part of a plant, but usually excludes seeds and most sweet fruit. This typically means the leaf, stem, or root of a plant.

===== Farming methods and practices =====
- Aeroponics – the process of growing plants in an air or mist environment without the use of soil or an aggregate medium.
- Aquaponics – combines aquaculture with hydroponics in a symbiotic environment.
- Artificial selection – describes intentional breeding for certain traits, or combination of traits.
- Field day (agriculture) – related to a show is the "field day", with elements of a trade show for machinery, equipment and skills required for broadacre farming.
- Grazing – a method of feeding in which a herbivore feeds on plants such as grasses.
- Hydroponics – a method of growing plants without soil.
- Intercropping – practice of growing two or more crops in proximity.
- Irrigation – artificial application of water to the land or soil.
- Permaculture – theory of ecological design which attempts to develop sustainable human settlements and agricultural systems modeled from natural ecosystems.
- Pollination management – horticultural practices that accomplish or enhance pollination of a crop, to improve yield or quality, by understanding of the particular crop's pollination needs, and by knowledgeable management of pollenizers, pollinators, and pollination conditions.
- Sustainable agriculture – practice of farming using principles of ecology, the study of relationships between organisms and their environment.

==== Apiculture (Beekeeping) ====
- Apiary – place where beehives of honey bees are kept.
- Apiology – scientific study of honey bees
- Bee – flying insects closely related to wasps and ants, and are known for their role in pollination and for producing honey and beeswax.
- Beehive – enclosed structure in which some honey bee species of the subgenus Apis live and raise their young.
- Beekeeper – person who keeps honey bees.
- Honey – sweet food made by bees using nectar from flowers.

==== Fishery ====
Fishing – activity of trying to catch fish. Fish are normally caught in the wild. Techniques for catching fish include hand gathering, spearing, netting, angling and trapping.

- Fishery – facility engaged in raising or harvesting fish

==== Forestry ====
Forestry – interdisciplinary profession embracing the science, art, and craft of creating, managing, using, and conserving forests and associated resources in a sustainable manner to meet desired goals, needs, and values for human benefit.

- Agroforestry – integrated approach of using the interactive benefits from combining trees and shrubs with crops and/or livestock.
- Analog forestry – system of planned, managed forests, primarily employed in tropical or subtropical areas.
- Forest gardening – low-maintenance organic plant-based food production and agroforestry system based on woodland ecosystems, incorporating fruit and nut trees, shrubs, herbs, vines and perennial vegetables which have yields directly useful to humans.
- Forest farming – agroforestry practice characterized by the four "I's"- Intentional, Integrated, Intensive and Interactive management of an existing forested ecosystem wherein forest health is of paramount concern. Moreover, agriculture means cultivation of crops and rearing of animals, processing of farm produce and selling.

==== Ranching ====
Ranching – practice of raising grazing livestock such as cattle or sheep for meat or wool.

=== Climate-based agriculture ===
- Arid-zone agriculture – agriculture practiced in desert areas of any sort.
- Greenhouse gas emissions from agriculture
- Tropical agriculture – agriculture practiced in the tropics.

=== Agricultural Disciplines ===
==== Agricultural chemistry ====
Agricultural chemistry – study of both chemistry and biochemistry which are important in agricultural production, the processing of raw products into foods and beverages, and in environmental monitoring and remediation.

==== Agricultural communication ====
Agricultural communication – field of study and work that focuses on communication about agricultural related information among agricultural stakeholders and between agricultural and non-agricultural stakeholders.

==== Agricultural economics ====
Agricultural economics – originally applied the principles of economics to the production of crops and livestock – a discipline known as agronomics. Agronomics was a branch of economics that specifically dealt with land usage. It focused on maximizing the crop yield while maintaining a good soil ecosystem. Throughout the 20th century the discipline expanded and the current scope of the discipline is much broader. Agricultural economics today includes a variety of applied areas, having considerable overlap with conventional economics.

- Agrarian system – the economic and technological factors that affect agricultural practices.
- Agribusiness – the various businesses involved in food production, including farming and contract farming, seed supply, agrichemicals, farm machinery, wholesale and distribution, processing, marketing, and retail sales.
- Agricultural extension – once known as the application of scientific research and new knowledge to agricultural practices through farmer education. The field of extension now encompasses a wider range of communication and learning activities organised for rural people by professionals from different disciplines, including agriculture, agricultural marketing, health, and business studies.
- Agricultural marketing – covers the services involved in moving an agricultural product from the farm to the consumer. This may include transferring of agricultural products either directly or indirectly through middleman to consumers.
- Custom harvesting – business of harvesting of crops for others. Custom harvesters usually own their own combines and work for the same farms every harvest season. Custom harvesting relieves farmers from having to invest capital in expensive equipment while at the same time maximizing the machinery's use.
- Economic development – sustained, concerted actions of policymakers and communities that promote the standard of living and economic health of a specific area.
- Rural Community Development – range of approaches and activities which aim to improve the welfare and livelihoods of people which live in rural area and through improving activities in rural areas it helps to maintain a population balance by reducing rural to urban migration.

==== Agricultural education ====
Agricultural education – instruction about crop production, livestock management, soil and water conservation, and various other aspects of agriculture. Farmers acquire adequate knowledge required on the correct amount use of agrochemicals and other agriculture related technologies.

Agricultural universities and colleges – tertiary agricultural educational institutions around the world

- Agricultural universities in India
- Agricultural universities in Indonesia

==== Agricultural engineering ====
Agricultural engineering – engineering discipline that applies engineering science and technology to agricultural production and processing.

- Agricultural Machinery – machinery used in the operation of an agricultural area or farm.
- Bioprocess engineering – specialization of biotechnology, chemical engineering or of agricultural engineering. It deals with the design and development of equipment and processes for the manufacturing of products such as food, feed, pharmaceuticals, nutraceuticals, chemicals, and polymers and paper from biological materials.
- Electrical energy efficiency on United States farms – covers the use of electricity on farms and the methods and incentives for improving the efficiency of that use.
- Electronics – branch of physics, engineering and technology dealing with electrical circuits that involve active electrical components such as vacuum tubes, transistors, diodes and integrated circuits, and associated passive interconnection technologies.
- Energy – ability a physical system has to do work on other physical systems.
- Farm equipment – any kind of machinery used on a farm to help with farming.
- Food engineering – multidisciplinary field of applied physical sciences which combines science, microbiology, and engineering education for food and related industries.
- Irrigation and drainage engineering –
- Natural resource – occur naturally within environments that exist relatively undisturbed by mankind, in a natural form. A natural resource is often characterized by amounts of biodiversity and geodiversity existent in various ecosystems.
- System engineering – interdisciplinary field of engineering focusing on how complex engineering projects should be designed and managed over their life cycles.
- Workshop – room or building which provides both the area and tools (or machinery) that may be required for the manufacture or repair of goods.
- Structures – buildings

==== Agricultural philosophy ====
Agricultural philosophy – discipline devoted to the systematic critique of the philosophical frameworks (or ethical world views) that are the foundation for decisions regarding agriculture.

==== Agricultural policy ====
Agricultural policy – set of laws relating to domestic agriculture and imports of foreign agricultural products.

- Agricultural science – broad multidisciplinary field that encompasses the parts of exact, natural, economic and social sciences that are used in the practice and understanding of agriculture.
- Agricultural economics – originally applied the principles of economics to the production of crops and livestock – a discipline known as agronomics. Agronomics was a branch of economics that specifically dealt with land usage. It focused on maximizing the crop yield while maintaining a good soil ecosystem. Throughout the 20th century the discipline expanded and the current scope of the discipline is much broader. Agricultural economics today includes a variety of applied areas, having considerable overlap with conventional economics.
- Agricultural engineering – engineering discipline that applies engineering science and technology to agricultural production and processing.
- Agrophysics – branch of science bordering on agronomy and physics, whose objects of study are the agroecosystem – the biological objects, biotope and biocoenosis affected by human activity, studied and described using the methods of physical sciences.
- Animal science – studying the biology of animals that are under the control of mankind.
  - Animal breeding – branch of animal science that addresses the evaluation (using best linear unbiased prediction and other methods) of the genetic value (estimated breeding value, EBV) of domestic livestock.
  - Animal nutrition – focuses on the dietary needs of domesticated animals, primarily those in agriculture and food production.
  - Fisheries science – academic discipline of managing and understanding fisheries.
  - Poultry science – animal science applied to poultry – chickens, ducks, geese, turkeys, quail, etc.
- Aquaculture – is the farming of aquatic organisms such as fish, crustaceans, molluscs and aquatic plants.
- Biological engineering –
  - Genetic engineering – deliberate modification of the genetic structure of an organism.
  - Microbiology – branch of biology that deals with microorganisms, especially their effects on man and other living organisms.
- Environmental science – integrated study of factors that influence the environment and environmental systems, especially the interaction of the physical, chemical, and biological components of the environment
  - Conservation – preservation and wise use of resources
  - Wildlife management – attempts to balance the needs of wildlife with the needs of people using the best available science.
    - Wildlife range management –
  - Resources management – efficient and effective deployment of an organization's resources when they are needed.
- Food science – study concerned with all technical aspects of foods, beginning with harvesting or slaughtering, and ending with its cooking and consumption, an ideology commonly referred to as "from field to fork". It is considered one of the life sciences and is usually considered distinct from the field of nutrition.
  - Human nutrition – provision to obtain the materials necessary to support life.
  - Food technology – branch of food science which deals with the actual production processes to make foods.

===== Agronomy =====
Agronomy – science and technology of producing and using plants for food, fuel, feed, fiber, and reclamation.

- Plant science – science of plant life.
  - Crop science – broad multidisciplinary field that encompasses the parts of exact, natural, economic and social sciences that are used in the practice and understanding of agriculture.
  - Plant pathology – scientific study of plant diseases caused by pathogens (infectious diseases) and environmental conditions (physiological factors).
  - Forestry – interdisciplinary profession embracing the science, art, and craft of creating, managing, using, and conserving forests and associated resources in a sustainable manner to meet desired goals, needs, and values for human benefit.
  - Outline of wood science –
- Theoretical production ecology – quantitatively studies the growth of crops.
- Horticulture – art, science, technology and business of intensive plant cultivation for human use.
- Plant breeding – art and science of changing the genetics of plants in order to produce desired characteristics.
- fertilizer – any organic or inorganic material of natural or synthetic origin (other than liming materials) that is added to a soil to supply one or more plant nutrients essential to the growth of plants.

====== Horticulture ======
Horticulture – art, science, technology and business of intensive plant cultivation for human use.

===== Agricultural soil science =====
Agricultural soil science – branch of soil science that deals with the study of edaphic conditions as they relate to the production of food and fiber.

- Agrogeology – study of minerals of importance to farming and horticulture, especially with regard to soil fertility and fertilizer components. These minerals are usually essential plant nutrients and are referred to as agrominerals.
- Agrology – branch of soil science dealing with the production of crops.
- Agrominerals – minerals of importance to agriculture and horticulture, and are usually essential plant nutrients.
- Land degradation – process in which the value of the biophysical environment is affected by one or more combination of human-induced processes acting upon the land.
- Land improvement – investments making land more usable by humans.
- Soil chemistry – study of the chemical characteristics of soil.
  - Soil amendment – material added to soil to improve plant growth and health.
  - Soil erosion – process by which soil is removed from the Earth's surface by natural processes such as wind or water flow, and then transported and deposited in other locations.
  - Soil life – collective term for all the organisms living within the soil.
  - Soil type – refers to the different sizes of mineral particles in a particular sample.
  - Soils retrogression and degradation – two regressive evolution processes associated with the loss of equilibrium of a stable soil.

==== Agroecology ====
Agroecology – application of ecological principles to the production of food, fuel, fiber, and pharmaceuticals and the management of agroecosystems.

- Agroecosystem analysis – thorough analysis of an agricultural environment which considers aspects from ecology, sociology, economics, and politics with equal weight.
- Agrophysics – branch of science bordering on agronomy and physics, whose objects of study are the agroecosystem – the biological objects, biotope and biocoenosis affected by human activity, studied and described using the methods of physical sciences.
- Biodiversity – degree of variation of life forms within a given species, ecosystem, biome, or an entire planet.
- Effects of climate change on agriculture – interrelated processes, both of which take place on a global scale.
- Composting – Compost is organic matter that has been decomposed and recycled as a fertilizer and soil amendment.
- Ecology – scientific study of the relations that living organisms have with respect to each other and their natural environment.
- Ecosystem – biological system consisting of all the living organisms or biotic components in a particular area and the nonliving or abiotic component with which the organisms interact, such as air, mineral soil, water and sunlight.
- Environmental Economics – subfield of economics concerned with environmental issues.
- Green manure – type of cover crop grown primarily to add nutrients and organic matter to the soil.
- Natural resources – occur naturally within environments that exist relatively undisturbed by mankind, in a natural form.
- Recycling – is processing used materials (waste) into new products to prevent waste of potentially useful materials, reduce the consumption of fresh raw materials, reduce energy usage, reduce air pollution (from incineration) and water pollution (from landfilling) by reducing the need for "conventional" waste disposal, and lower greenhouse gas emissions as compared to virgin production.
- Rural Sociology – field of sociology associated with the study of social life in non-metropolitan areas.
- Soil Science – study of soil as a natural resource on the surface of the earth including soil formation, classification and mapping; physical, chemical, biological, and fertility properties of soils; and these properties in relation to the use and management of soils.
- Sustainable agriculture – practice of farming using principles of ecology, the study of relationships between organisms and their environment.
- Wildculture – umbrella term used to include all aspects and styles of "hunting and gathering" food harvesting.

== History of agriculture ==
History of agriculture – developed at least 10,000 years ago, although some forms of agriculture such as forest gardening and fire-stick farming date back even earlier to prehistoric times.

- Agriculture in ancient Greece
- Agriculture in Mesoamerica
- Ancient Egyptian agriculture
- Arab Agricultural Revolution –
- British Agricultural Revolution –
- Columbian Exchange
- Domestication
- Eastern Agricultural Complex
- Genomics of domestication – study of the structure, content, and evolution of genomes, or the entire genetic information of organisms.
- Green Revolution –
- History of agricultural science – began with Gregor Mendel's genetic work
- History of agriculture in Palestine
- History of organic farming –
- Neolithic Revolution – wide-scale transition of many human cultures from a lifestyle of hunting and gathering to agriculture and settlement.
- Incan agriculture
- Roman agriculture
- Selective breeding

== Agriculturally based manufacturing industries ==
=== Food industry ===
Food industry – complex, global collective of diverse businesses that together supply much of the food energy consumed by the world population.

- Bakery – establishment which produces and sells flour-based food baked in an oven such as bread, cakes, pastries and pies.
- Brewing – production of beer through steeping a starch source (commonly cereal grains) in water and then fermenting with yeast.
- Brewing industry – brewery is a dedicated building for the making of beer, though beer can be made at home, and has been for much of beer's history.
- Dairy – business enterprise established for the harvesting of animal milk – mostly from cows or goats, but also from buffalo, sheep, horses or camels – for human consumption.
- Distribution center – warehouse or other specialized building, often with refrigeration or air conditioning, which is stocked with products (goods) to be redistributed to retailers, to wholesalers, or directly to consumers.
- Food processing – set of methods and techniques used to transform raw ingredients into food or to transform food into other forms for consumption by humans or animals either in the home or by the food processing industry.
  - Food additive – substances added to food to preserve flavor or enhance its taste and appearance.
  - Food preservation – process of treating and handling food to stop or slow down spoilage (loss of quality, edibility or nutritional value) and thus allow for longer storage.
- Food safety – scientific discipline describing handling, preparation, and storage of food in ways that prevent foodborne illness.
- Food science – study concerned with all technical aspects of foods, beginning with harvesting or slaughtering, and ending with its cooking and consumption, an ideology commonly referred to as "from field to fork".
- Foodborne illness – any illness resulting from the consumption of contaminated food, pathogenic bacteria, viruses, or parasites that contaminate food, as well as chemical or natural toxins such as poisonous mushrooms.
- Mandatory labelling – requirement of consumer products to state their ingredients or components.
- Packaging – science, art, and technology of enclosing or protecting products for distribution, storage, sale, and use.
- Pasteurization – process of heating a food, usually a liquid, to a specific temperature for a definite length of time and then cooling it immediately.
- Quality assurance – planned and systematic activities implemented in a quality system so that quality requirements for a product or service will be fulfilled
- Sterilization (microbiology) – term referring to any process that eliminates (removes) or kills all forms of microbial life, including transmissible agents (such as fungi, bacteria, viruses, spore forms, etc.) present on a surface, contained in a fluid, in medication, or in a compound such as biological culture media.
- Warehouse – commercial building for storage of goods.
- Yeast – eukaryotic micro-organisms classified in the kingdom fungi, with 1,500 species currently described

=== Pulp and paper industry ===
Pulp and paper industry – comprises companies that use wood as a raw material to produce pulp, paper, board, and other cellulose-based products.

== Agricultural markets ==
=== Food distribution ===
- Agricultural marketing – services involved in moving an agricultural product from the farm to the consumer.
- Wholesale marketing – transactions made through wholesale markets

=== Food outlets ===
- Supermarket – self-service store offering a wide variety of food and household merchandise, organized into departments.
- Farmers' market – consists of individual vendors—mostly farmers—who set up booths, tables or stands, outdoors or indoors, to sell produce, meat products, fruits and sometimes prepared foods and beverages.
- Grocery store – store that retails food.
- Street market – outdoor market such as traditionally held in a market square or in a market town, and often held only on particular days of the week.

== Prominent agricultural scientists ==
- Robert Bakewell (farmer) – first to implement systematic selective breeding of livestock.
- Norman Borlaug – American agronomist, humanitarian, and Nobel laureate who has been called "the father of the Green Revolution".
- Luther Burbank – American botanist, horticulturist and am pioneer in agricultural science. He developed more than 800 strains and varieties of plants over his 55-year career.
- George Washington Carver – American scientist, botanist, educator, and inventor. Carver's reputation is based on his research into and promotion of alternative crops to cotton, such as peanuts, soybeans and sweet potatoes, which also aided nutrition for farm families.
- René Dumont – French engineer in agronomy, a sociologist, and an environmental politician.
- Charles Roy Henderson – statistician and a pioneer in animal breeding – the application of quantitative methods for the genetic evaluation of domestic livestock.
- Ronald Fisher – English statistician, evolutionary biologist, eugenicist and geneticist.
- Jay Lush – pioneering animal geneticist who made important contributions to livestock breeding. He is sometimes known as the father of modern scientific animal breeding.
- Gregor Mendel – Austrian scientist and Augustinian friar who gained posthumous fame as the founder of the new science of genetics. Mendel demonstrated that the inheritance of certain traits in pea plants follows particular patterns, now referred to as the laws of Mendelian inheritance.
- Louis Pasteur – French chemist and microbiologist born in Dole. He was best known to the general public for inventing a method to stop milk and wine from causing sickness, a process that came to be called pasteurization.
- M. S. Swaminathan – Indian agricultural scientist Swaminathan is known as the "Father of the Green Revolution in India" because of his leadership in introducing and developing high-yielding varieties of wheat.

== See also ==
- Agribusiness –
- Extensive farming –
- Factory farming –
- Free range –
- Industrial agriculture –
- Mechanised agriculture –
- Intensive farming –
- Stock-free agriculture –
- Subsistence agriculture –
- Urban agriculture –

Lists

- Largest producing countries of agricultural commodities
- List of agricultural organizations
- List of agricultural universities and colleges
- List of sustainable agriculture topics
