= Dobrzyński =

Dobrzyński (feminine: Dobrzyńska) is a Polish surname. It is a toponymic surname derived from any of the places named Dobrzyń. Its East Slavic equivalents are Dobrynsky and Dobrinski. Notable people with the surname include:

- Bronisław Dobrzyński, Polish musician, son of Ignacy Felix
- Edward Dobrzyński (died 1858), Polish musician, son of Ignacy
- Ignacy Dobrzyński (1779–1841), Polish musician
- Ignacy Feliks Dobrzyński (1807–1867), Polish composer
- Jan Dobrzyński (born 1958), Polish politician
- Judith Helen Dobrzynski (born 1949), American journalist
- Leszek Dobrzyński (born 1967), Polish politician

== See also ==
- Dobrzański
