= Dobrzański =

Dobrzański (female: Dobrzańska) is a Polish surname. It is a toponymic surname derived from places named Dobrzany, formerly in Poland, now Dobriany, Lviv Raion, Lviv Oblast and Dobriany, Stryi urban hromada, Stryi Raion, Lviv Oblast, Ukraine. Its East Slavic equivalents are Dobrzhansky and Dobriansky. Notable people with the surname include:

- Bohdan Dobrzański (1909–1987), Polish scientist
- Henryk Dobrzański (1897–1940), Polish army commander
- Sławomir Dobrzański (born 1968), Polish-American pianist, teacher and musicologist
- Stanisław Dobrzański (born 1949), Polish politician
- Tom Dobrzanski, Canadian record producer, engineer, mixer and musician

== See also ==
- Dobrzyński
