= Bohdan Dobrzański =

Polish scientist (1909–1987)

- Born: 3 March 1909; Strutynka, Russian Empire
- Died: 15 July 1987 (aged 78); Warsaw, Poland
- Citizenship: Poland
- Education: Lviv Polytechnic
- Awards: Polonia Restituta
- Scientific career
- Fields: Soil science, Agrophysics, Agronomy
- Workplaces: Lviv Polytechnic, Agricultural Office in Rzeszów, Warsaw University of Life Sciences, Maria Curie-Skłodowska University, Lublin Higher School of Agriculture, Institute for Land Reclamation and Grassland Farming, Institute of Agrophysics PAS

Bohdan Dobrzański (3 March 1909 – 15 July 1987) was a Polish soil scientist, agrophysicist, agronomist, academic, and professor at several Warsaw- and Lublin-based universities. As the Rector of the Lublin Higher School of Agriculture, he led the formation of the first Chair of Soil Science in Poland. Dobrzański was a pioneer of agrophysics in Poland, a founder and long-time director of the Institute of Agrophysics in Lublin, and the Polish Journal of Soil Science. He is a co-author of the official Table of Land Classes and criteria for valorisation of agricultural production areas. He was awarded a number of prizes and medals including The Commander's Cross of the Order of Polonia Restituta.

== Life and education ==
Bohdan Dobrzański was born in Strutynka (Струтинка), a village currently in Podilsk Raion, Odesa Oblast, Ukraine. He was the son of Stanisław Dobrzański and Zofia née Mianowska. His father was a property administrator. In 1922, he moved to Poland and settled in Puławy with his mother. His father died of typhus during the move.

In 1929, after finishing high school in Puławy, he started his studies at the Faculty of Agriculture and Forestry in Lviv Polytechnic (at the time, Lviv was part of Poland, nowadays it is in Ukraine). In 1933, after graduating, he worked as an agricultural instructor in the Lviv Agricultural Office. At the same time, he held a position as an assistant in the Department of Soil Science and Agricultural Chemistry, Lviv Polytechnic, then headed by Arkadiusz Musierowicz, with headquarters in Dubliany near Lviv. In 1939, he obtained a PhD in Agricultural Science. That same year, after the invasion of the Red Army into Eastern Poland, he decided to remain at the university as a docent. In 1941, after the occupation of Lviv by the Nazi army, he moved to Podolia, where he worked in one of the forestry districts. At the end of 1944 he got employed by the Agricultural Office in Rzeszów, where he organized agricultural courses.

After the war, Dobrzański moved to Warsaw where he became an adjunct in the Warsaw University of Life Sciences. Around that time, he often traveled to Rzeszów, where from 1945 he was the director of the Agricultural Office. In 1946, after moving Prof. Jan Tomaszewski to Wrocław, to the Maria Curie-Skłodowska University (UMCS) in Lublin, the head position of the Department of Soil Science at the Faculty of Agriculture had become vacant. Dobrzański took it as assistant professor. At the same time, he became the curator of the Department of Plant Fertilization and Nutrition; he held this position until 1949. In 1949 he presented his habilitation thesis about loess soils of the northern edge of Podolia and their properties, and became doctor habilitatus. In 1951 he became an associate professor, and in 1956 full-time professor. In 1955 he joined the organization of the Lublin Higher School of Agriculture, which was established from the Faculty of Agriculture, Veterinary and Zootechnic UMCS (nowadays University of Life Sciences in Lublin). For the next four years he was the rector there. In 1955 he led the establishment of the first Chair of Soil Science in Poland, at the Faculty of Biology and Earth Sciences of the Lublin Higher School of Agriculture. Dobrzański also created and managed the Laboratory of Soil Science at the Institute for Land Reclamation and Grassland Farming in Lublin. From 1957 until 1962, he was the deputy secretary of Division 5 of the Polish Academy of Sciences. In 1960 he became a correspondent member of the Polish Academy of Sciences, and in 1969 a full member.

In 1968 Dobrzański initiated the founding of the Institute of Agrophysics of the Polish Academy of Sciences in Lublin, where he served as director till 1980. There he created a new research field: the physics of plants and crops. In 1969, he was honored with the title of doctor honoris causa (honorary doctor) of the Lublin Higher School of Agriculture. In the same year, he became secretary general of the Polish Academy of Sciences and head of the Department of Soil Science, Warsaw University of Life Sciences. Because of that he moved to Warsaw. In 1970 the Department became the Institute of Soil Science and Agricultural Chemistry; Dobrzański directed it until 1979. In 1980 he became the honorary doctor of Maria Curie-Skłodowska University, and six years later of the Academy of Agriculture and Technology in Olsztyn.

Dobrzański was also an honorary member of the Hungarian Academy of Sciences, the Lenin All-Union Academy of Agricultural Sciences of the USSR and the Academy of Agricultural Sciences of the GDR.

Dobrzański died on July 15, 1987, in Warsaw and was buried in the Powązki Cemetery.

== Work ==
Dobrzański was the author or co-author of over 350 publications, including over 160 research papers. They were mainly about the genesis and evolution of soil, as well as human influences on their properties. He also dealt with soil cartography and co-authored every major cartographic study that appeared in Poland from 1949 to 1987. In 1968 he established the Polish Journal of Soil Science and managed it until 1987. He was also the co-author of the official Table of Land Classes and developed criteria for valorisation of agricultural production areas, which led to the creation of soil agricultural maps at various scales.

== Awards and decorations ==
- Award of the Scientific Secretary of the Polish Academy of Sciences
- Award of the Minister of Science and Higher Education
- Order of the Banner of Work
- The Knight's Cross of the Order of Polonia Restituta
- The Commander's Cross of the Order of Polonia Restituta
