= RICP =

RICP may refer to:

- Raised intracranial pressure
- Research Institute of Crop Production, Czech Republic
- Return of Indigenous Cultural Property, i.e. Repatriation (cultural heritage)
- Rhode Island Capitol Police, United States
