= Dobrinsky =

Dobrinsky may refer to:

- Dobrinsky District, a district of Lipetsk Oblast, Russia
- Dobrinsky District, Volgograd Oblast, former district in the Soviet Union
- Nizhnyaya Dobrinka District, former district in the Soviet Union
- Dobrinski, a surname
