= Dobriany =

Dobriany (Ukrainian: Добряни) may refer to the following places in the Lviv Oblast of Ukraine:

- Dobriany, Lviv Raion, Lviv Oblast
- Dobriany, Stryi urban hromada, Stryi Raion, Lviv Oblast
- Dobriany, Trostianets rural hromada, Stryi Raion, Lviv Oblast
