= Dobriansky =

Dobriansky (masculine), Dobrianska (feminine), Ukrainian: Добрянський, Добрянська, is a Ukrainian surname. Polish versions: Dobrzański/Dobrzańska. Russian versions: Dobryansky, Dobryanskaya. Notable people with the surname include:

- Adolf Dobriansky, public figure and leader of the Carpatho-Rusyn movement in Subcarpathian Rus', lawyer and writer
- Andrij Dobriansky (1930–2012), Metropolitan opera singer born in Ukraine
- Lev Dobriansky (1918–2008), American economist and diplomat
- Paula Dobriansky (born 1955), American foreign policy expert of Ukrainian descent

== See also ==
- Dobryansky District, a district in Russia
- Dobrzhansky, Russian phonetic transliteration of Polish version
