= Agrogeology =

Study of origins and applications of minerals important to farming

Agrogeology is the study of the origins of minerals known as agrominerals and their applications. These minerals are of importance to farming and horticulture, especially with regard to soil fertility and fertilizer components. These minerals are usually essential plant nutrients. Agrogeology can also be defined as the application of geology to problems in agriculture, particularly in reference to soil productivity and health. This field is a combination of a few different fields, including geology, soil science, agronomy, and chemistry. The overall objective is to advance agricultural production by using geological resources to improve chemical and physical aspects of soil.

== History ==
The first agrogeology project to receive major funding was the Tanzania-Canada project (1989). This project took place in southern Tanzania as a way to assist farmers in increasing soil productivity by finding and testing local raw materials. However, the use of raw materials as fertilizer is a practice that dates back to the 1800s. Erling Bjarne Johnson discovered the nitrophosphate process in the years 1927–28.

== Rock phosphate as fertilizer ==
A common problem faced in agriculture is dealing with soils lacking in phosphorus. Phosphorus, along with nitrogen and potassium, is an important element in determining plant development and health. A high percentage of traditional fertilizers intended to mend phosphorus-deficient soils end up becoming insoluble complexes in the soil. This presents a need for constant reapplication. Rock phosphate, also known as phosphorite, can be used as a sustainable, cost-effective method to mend problems associated with plant growth.

Rock phosphate is mined from clay deposits that contain phosphorus. It can be found on across South Africa, Canada, sea beds, and sea mounts in the Pacific and Atlantic oceans. These rocks are mostly sedimentary, one example being limestone.

Unlike other elements that are soluble and easily accessible, rock phosphate needs to be processed in order to make the phosphorus in them available for plant and soil intake. Currently, there are a few ways of processing rock phosphate. Microbial solubilization of rock phosphate through fungi has been found to be able to break down inorganic phosphate into soluble forms by processes that produce organic acids.

Residual dust from mining has also been used in conjunction with processed fertilizer in order to improve plant development. A study in Zimbabwe suggests that this mixture increases plant growth, phosphorus levels, and organic carbon.

Commercial fertilizers mine and process rock phosphate using chemistry. Phosphorite is mined primarily by surface methods using draglines and bucket wheel excavators. Once it is ground and impurities are removed, water and sulfuric acid is added to the phosphate rock which generates gypsum crystals, a way of getting rid of what we don't want, leaving phosphorus as an acidic liquid. To raise phosphorus levels, impurities are precipitated out and any excess water is evaporated. Then vapor ammonia is applied to the liquid phosphorus and the end products are phosphorus granules.

== Multi-nutrient rock fertilizers ==
Multi-nutrient rock fertilizers are slow releasing fertilizers that contain micro-nutrients, such as potassium, calcium, and magnesium, as well as smaller amounts of macro-nutrients like phosphorus. The idea is to mimic natural weathering that happens to parent material in the soil over long periods of time.

With industrial fertilizers becoming more of an issue, both for farmers as costs continue to increase and environmentalists with ecological concerns, many people have been searching for alternatives. While using multi-nutrient rock fertilizers can't replace industrial fertilizers, it does have other benefits. Where chemical fertilizers only introduce one or two nutrients, these rock fertilizers introduce a wide range of nutrients to the soil environment. This is important for nutrient deprived soils, such as after heavy agricultural production. Other benefits of these rock fertilizers include raising the pH of the soils and being able to locally source materials from mining waste. This method is not without downsides: it requires a high amount of application, the release rate of nutrients is slow, and as compared to industrial fertilizers, it's not as effective as other agronomic methods.

== List of other raw materials used in agriculture ==
Apatite - a major source of slow release of phosphate in acidic soils.

Carbonate - contains liming materials used to solve problems of acidity and related toxicities.

Malachite – useful for correction of copper deficiencies

Scoria – useful as a mulching material to conserve soil water and provide slow release of nutrients.

Zeolite – useful in conserving nitrogen and releasing phosphorus from apatite couple reaction, also raises pH

== Future ==
Using raw materials could drastically improve agricultural production as it is both cost-effective, easily accessible, and sustainable. Agrogeology, although still in development, is proving to be of agronomic importance for crop cultivation and yield, resulting in solving issues regarding food shortage and the economy associated with farming.

Scientists who specialize in agrogeology are termed agrogeologists.

== See also ==
- Dietary mineral
- Edaphology
- Essential nutrient
- Micronutrients
