= Agricultural science =

Academic field within biology

Agricultural science (or agriscience for short) is a broad multidisciplinary field of biology that encompasses the parts of exact, natural, economic and social sciences that are used in the practice and understanding of agriculture. Professionals of the agricultural science are called agricultural scientists or agriculturists.

== History ==
In the 18th century, Johann Friedrich Mayer conducted experiments on the use of gypsum (hydrated calcium sulfate) as a fertilizer.

In 1843, John Bennet Lawes and Joseph Henry Gilbert began a set of long-term field experiments at Rothamsted Research in England, some of which are still running as of 2018.

In the United States, a scientific revolution in agriculture began with the Hatch Act of 1887, which used the term "agricultural science". The Hatch Act was driven by farmers' interest in knowing the constituents of early artificial fertilizer. The Smith–Hughes Act of 1917 shifted agricultural education back to its vocational roots, but the scientific foundation had been built. For the next 44 years after 1906, federal expenditures on agricultural research in the United States outpaced private expenditures.

== Environmental impact ==
Climate change has had significant effects on modern agriculture, making weather patterns less predictable and increasing the frequency and intensity of extreme events such as prolonged droughts, floods and heatwaves. As a result, crop production has become more uncertain even in regions that were previously characterised by relatively stable climatic conditions. Changes in temperature and rainfall regimes are also contributing to soil erosion, desertification and the degradation of water resources, with implications for long-term agricultural productivity and rural livelihoods.

To address these issues, there has been increasing interest in agricultural research and practice in the so-called climate-smart strategies aimed at adapting agricultural systems to the existing and the forecasted climate effects and the minimisation of greenhouse gas emissions wherever feasible. These measures involve more efficient use of water and nutrients, crop and agriculture system diversification, soil and water protection, and creating crops and livestock strains more resistant to heat and drought among other challenges. The thrust of these endeavors defines the fundamental importance of agricultural science to the maintenance of food production, safeguarding natural resources and promoting resilience to environmental change.

== Prominent agricultural scientists ==
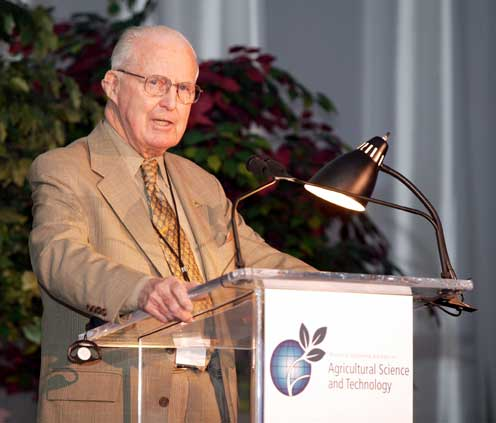
Norman Borlaug, father of the Green Revolution.

- Wilbur Olin Atwater
- Robert Bakewell
- Norman Borlaug
- Luther Burbank
- George Washington Carver
- Carl Henry Clerk
- George C. Clerk
- René Dumont
- Masanobu Fukuoka
- Sir Albert Howard
- Kailas Nath Kaul
- Thomas Lecky
- Justus von Liebig
- Jay Laurence Lush
- Gregor Mendel
- Louis Pasteur
- M. S. Swaminathan
- Jethro Tull
- Artturi Ilmari Virtanen
- Sewall Wright

== Fields or related disciplines ==
- Agricultural biotechnology
- Agricultural chemistry
- Agricultural diversification
- Agricultural education
- Agricultural economics
- Agricultural engineering
- Agricultural geography
- Agricultural marketing
- Agricultural soil science
  - Soil science
- Agroecology
- Agronomy
  - Botany
  - Theoretical production ecology
  - Horticulture
  - Plant breeding
  - Plant fertilization
- Agrophysics
- Animal science
  - Animal breeding
  - Animal husbandry
  - Animal nutrition
- Biological engineering
  - Genetic engineering
- Entomology
- Environmental science
- Farm management
- Fisheries science
  - Aquaculture
  - Fisheries
  - Marine fisheries
- Food science
  - Human nutrition
- Irrigation and water management
- Microbiology
  - Plant pathology
- Nematology
- Range management
- Waste management
- Weed science

== Scope ==
Agriculture, agricultural science, and agronomy are closely related. However, they cover different concepts. Agriculture is the set of activities that transform the environment for the production of animals and plants for human use. Agriculture concerns techniques, including the application of agronomic research. Agronomy is research and development related to studying and improving plant-based crops. Geoponics is the science of cultivating the earth. Hydroponics involves growing plants without soil, by using water-based mineral nutrient solutions in an artificial environment.

== Research ==
Agricultural sciences include research and development on:

- Improving agricultural productivity in terms of quantity and quality (e.g., selection of drought-resistant crops and animals, development of new pesticides, yield-sensing technologies, simulation models of crop growth, in-vitro cell culture techniques)
- Minimizing the effects of pests (weeds, insects, pathogens, mollusks, nematodes) on crop or animal production systems.
- Transformation of primary products into end-consumer products (e.g., production, preservation, and packaging of dairy products)
- Prevention and correction of adverse environmental effects (e.g., soil degradation, waste management, bioremediation)
- Theoretical production ecology, relating to crop production modeling
- Traditional agricultural systems, sometimes termed subsistence agriculture, which feed most of the poorest people in the world. These systems are of interest as they sometimes retain a level of integration with natural ecological systems greater than that of industrial agriculture, which may be more sustainable than some modern agricultural systems.
- Food production and demand globally, with particular attention paid to the primary producers, such as China, India, Brazil, the US, and the EU.
- Various sciences relating to agricultural resources and the environment (e.g. soil science, agroclimatology); biology of agricultural crops and animals (e.g. crop science, animal science and their included sciences, e.g. ruminant nutrition, farm animal welfare); such fields as agricultural economics and rural sociology; various disciplines encompassed in agricultural engineering.

== See also ==
- Outline of agricultural science
