= Agrophysical Research Institute =

Russian public research and higher education facility

- Агрофизический научно-исследовательский институт
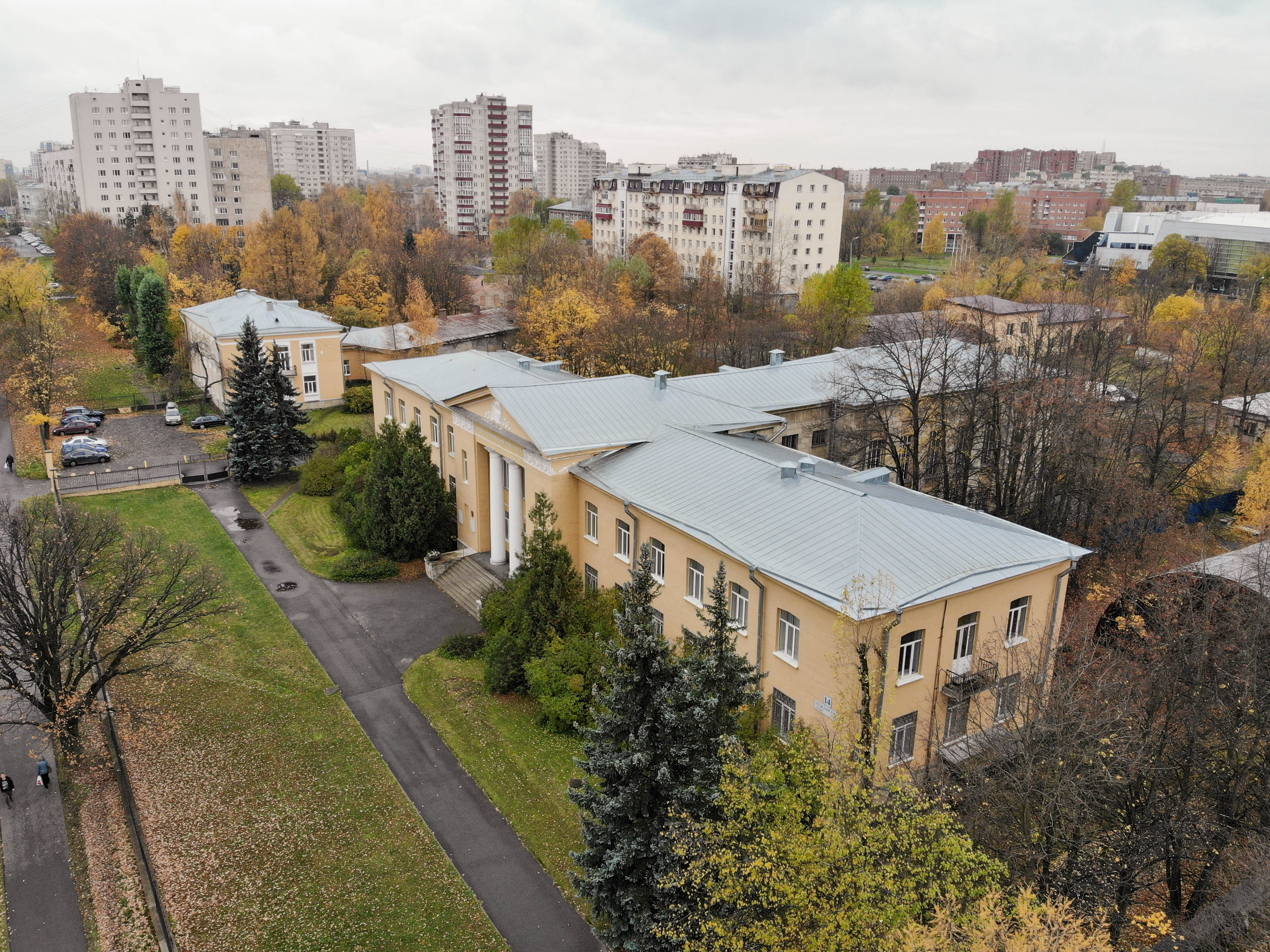
- Formation: 1932
- Founder: Abram Ioffe
- Type: Federal State Scientific Institution
- Purpose: Research and education
- Location: 195220, Saint-Petersburg; Grazhdanskiy pr., 14, Russia
- Coordinates: 60.00056°N 30.38419°E
- Director: Yury Valentinovich Chesnokov, 7-812-534-13-24, yuv_chesnokov@agrophys.ru
- Science Deputy Director: Natalia Petrovna Buchkina
- Scientific Secretary: Irina Valentinovna Tarasenkova
- Deputy Director: Sergey Nikolaevich Kovtuh
- Parent organization: Russian Academy of Agricultural Sciences, Russian Academy of Sciences
- Website: www.agrophys.ru/Agrophysical-institute

The Agrophysical Research Institute (AFI, Агрофизический научно-исследовательский институт) is a public research and higher education facility dedicated to the study of agrophysics, agricultural sciences and research on physical problems of agriculture. The institute was founded in 1932 in Leningrad, USSR (now St. Petersburg, Russia). The institute is part of the Russian Academy of Agricultural Sciences which, in 2013, became part of the Russian Academy of Sciences.

== Mission ==
The AFI conducts research and undertakes education to advance understanding of the agrophysics, including physical mechanisms influencing agriculture, and to communicating this understanding for the benefit of society.

== History ==
The AFI was founded in January 1932 by the Soviet Ministry of Agriculture and Food (which was known at the time as the People's Commissariat for Agriculture-Narkomzem) and the Presidium of the Russian Academy of Agricultural Sciences. The Presidium of the Supreme Soviet recognized the AFI's work in the development of agricultural science and application of scientific achievements to agricultural production. In 1982 it awarded the AFI the Order of the Red Banner, and so the AFI became the Order of the Red Banner of Labor Agrophysical Research Institute of the Lenin All-Union Academy of Agricultural Sciences (AFI of Agricultural Sciences).

In 1992, after the dissolution of the Soviet Union, a decree by the president of the Russian Federation created a unified Russian Academy of Agricultural Sciences. The AFI was renamed the Order of the Red Banner of Labor Agrophysical Research Institute of the Russian Academy of Agricultural Sciences (RAAS AFI). In 2003, AFI was renamed the State Scientific Institution of the Order of the Red Banner Agrophysical Research Institute of the Russian Academy of Agricultural Sciences (RAAS GNU AFI). In 2014, the institute was renamed yet again to the Federal State Scientific Institution "Agrophysical Research Institute" (FGBNU AFI).

Throughout its history, the AFI's scientists have highlighted the importance of physical factors in the life of plants and formulated the main task of agronomic physics to be the comprehensive study of these factors. The AFI uses advances in physics, chemistry, mathematics and biology, to solve problems in agriculture and to increase its efficiency. The AFI sees its work today as continuing the scientific traditions of the world-famous physicist Abram Ioffe and the botanist and geneticist Nikolai Vavilov. In fact, the term 'agrophysics' itself was first proposed by Ioffe to cover the relations within the soil environment, and especially those of the mass and energy transfer in the soil–plant–atmosphere system. Ioffe was founder and director of the AFI for 28 years.
