= History of agricultural science =

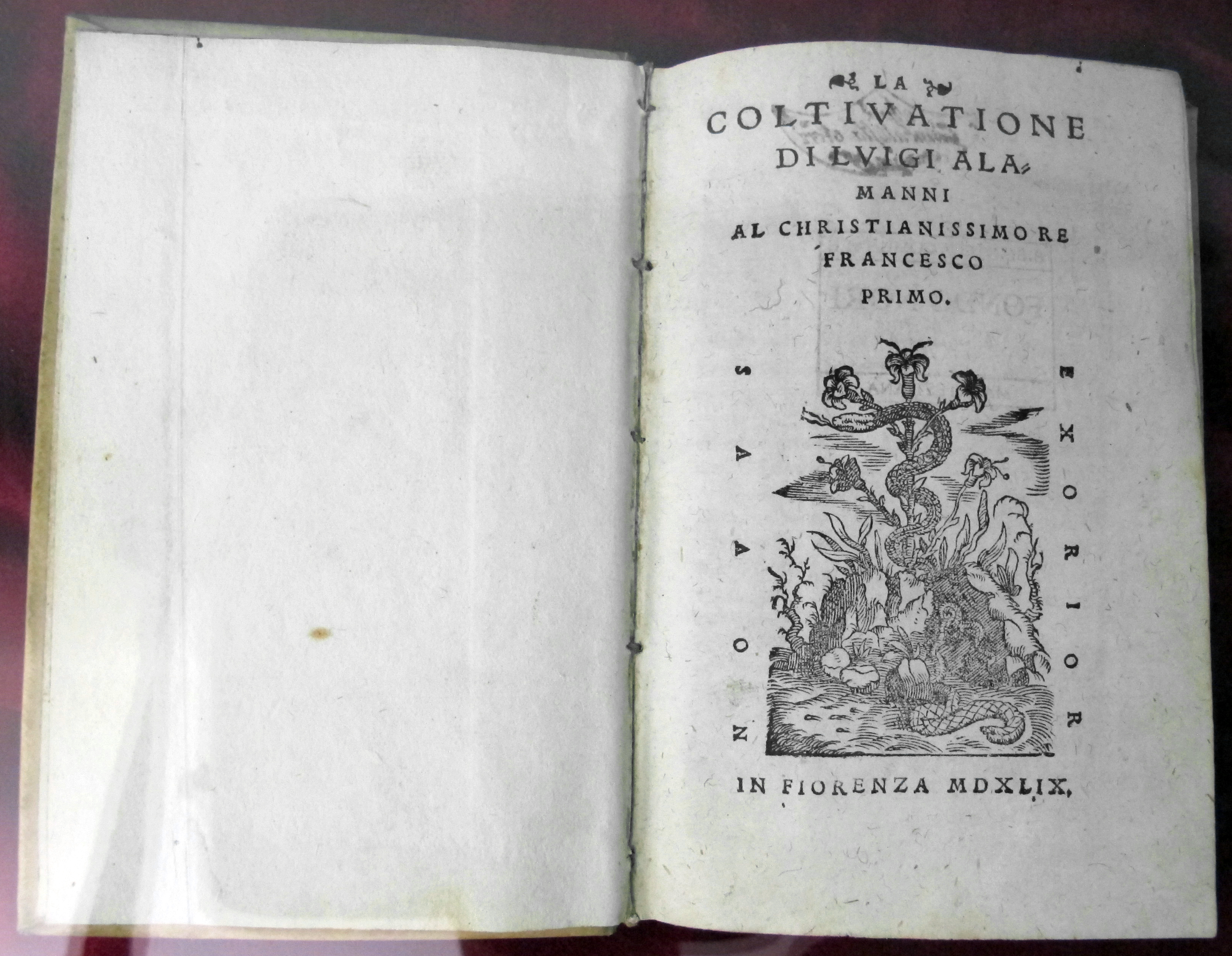
Italian Renaissance book on cultivation, written in 1549

The history of agricultural science is a sub-field of the history of agriculture which looks at the scientific advancement of techniques and understanding of agriculture. Early study of organic production in botanical gardens was continued in with agricultural experiment stations in several countries.

Fertilizer is a major contribution to agriculture history increasing the fertility of the soil and minimizing nutrient loss. Scientific study of fertilizer was advanced significantly in 1840 with the publication Die organische Chemie in ihrer Anwendung auf Agrikulturchemie und Physiologie (Organic Chemistry in Its Applications to Agriculture and Physiology) by Justus von Liebig. One of Liebig's advances in agricultural science was the discovery of nitrogen as an essential plant nutrient.

== Fertilizer ==
The first method of soil nourishment utilized compost. Composting used rotten organic materials to replenish the soil of its nutrients and dates back to tenth and twelfth century Arab writings. Composting was a normal and widely used practice of fertilization, up into the twentieth century.

Johann Friedrich Mayer was the first scientist to publish experiments on the use of gypsum as a fertilizer, but the mechanism that made it function as a fertilizer was contested by his contemporaries.

Agricultural science developed when analytical chemistry began to address organic compounds. Fertilization with decomposed plants sometimes gave a whiff of ammonia, which suggested a role for nitrogen in biological growth. Gerardus Mulder tried to determine the chemical formula for albumin and similar biological substances, but Justus von Liebig is usually cited as the early visionary of protein structure. For instance, he assigned his student Eben Horsford the task of comparing the nitrogen content of grains. More significantly, Liebig analysed biological growth as constrained by limiting factors such as a shortage of phosphorus, potassium or nitrogen. His view is called Liebig's law of the minimum. As the nineteenth century progressed so did soil science and its promulgation by farm journals such as those published by Luther Tucker.

The production of synthetic ammonia was acquired by Fritz Haber and Carl Bosh. Haber discovered the reaction process to produce ammonia and Bosh was able to pressurize it to complete the process. Together Haber and Bosch came up with the Haber-Bosch process that fixated nitrogen to produce ammonia that is used in most fertilizers. In 1918 Fritz Haber received a Nobel Prize in Chemistry for the invention of this process. Carl Bosch also received a Nobel Prize in 1918, but for high-pressure studies. Without the pressure studies this process wouldn't be possible.

In the United States, a scientific revolution in agriculture began with the Hatch Act of 1887, which used the term "agricultural science". The Hatch Act was driven by farmers' interest in knowing the constituents of early artificial fertilizer. Later on, the Smith–Hughes Act of 1917 shifted agricultural education back to its vocational roots, but the scientific foundation had been built. After 1906, public expenditures on agricultural research in the US exceeded private expenditures for the next 44 years.

== Genetics ==
A genetic study of agricultural science began with Gregor Mendel's work. Using statistical methods, Mendel developed the model of Mendelian inheritance which accurately describes the inheritance of dominant and recessive genes. His results were controversial at the time and were not widely accepted.

In 1900, Hugo de Vries published his findings after rediscovering Mendel's work, and in 1905 William Bateson coined the term "genetics" in a letter to Adam Sedgwick. The study of genetics carried into an experiment isolating DNA.

== Agronomy ==
In 1843, John Lawes and Joseph Henry Gilbert began a set of long-term field experiments in agronomy at Rothamsted Research Station in England; some of them are still running.

In 1905, Sir Albert Howard, studied agronomy and focused on organic agriculture processes. In 1943, Howard published his book on An Agriculture Testament.

== Education ==
In 1917 the Smith–Hughes Act allowed agricultural education to enter public schools in the United States.

Agriculture took a big hit between the late 1920s and early 1930s during the great depression and dust bowl. The Future Farmers of America (FFA), once known as Future Farmers of Virginia, was created to educate and maintain interest of potential farmers in 1926. Over the years this organization, joined with New Farmers of America, changed the world and educated many about farming processes and encouraged agriculture participation.

National Association of Agricultural Educators (NAAE) began to help give teachers the ability to start a FFA chapter in their school system and standardize the curriculum all over the country.

There are various universities around the United States which are well known for educating students in the field of the agricultural sciences. These universities include Texas A&M, Stephen F. Austin State University, University of Idaho and many others.

== See also ==
- History of agriculture
- List of agricultural scientists
