= Ignacy Feliks Dobrzyński =

Polish pianist and composer

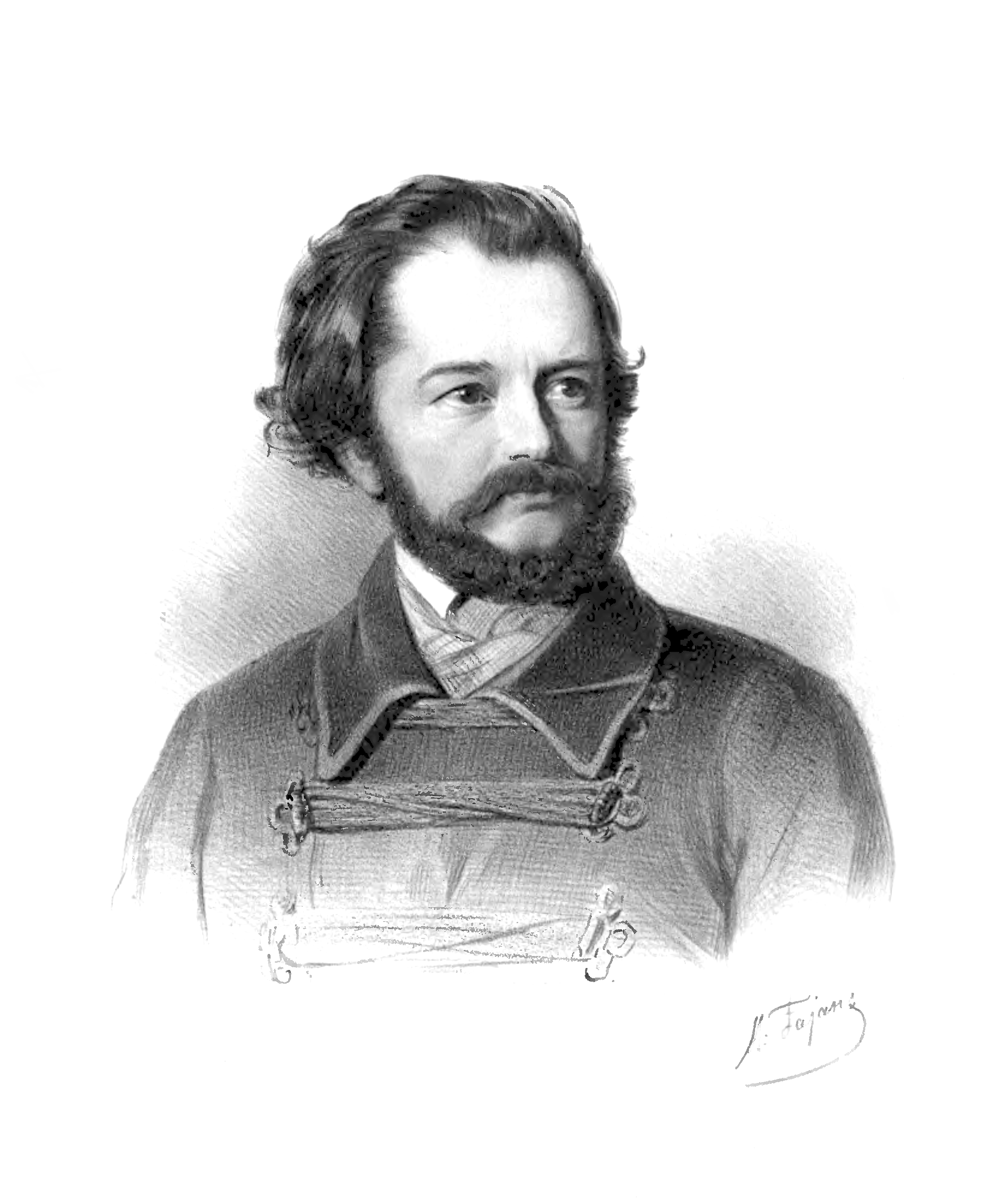
Ignacy Feliks Dobrzyński. Portrait by Maksymilian Fajans.

Ignacy Feliks Dobrzyński (15 February 1807 – 9 October 1867) was a Polish pianist and composer. He was the son of Ignacy Dobrzyński, the brother of Edward Dobrzyński, and the father of Bronisław Dobrzyński.

== Life ==
Dobrzyński was born on former Polish territory in Romanów, in Volhynia, Russian Empire, now Romaniv, Zhytomyr Oblast, Ukraine (Ukr. Романів), known from 1933 to 2003 as Dzerzhynsk (Rus. Дзержинськ, Pol. Dzierżyńsk).

He attended a Jesuit school in Romanów, then continued his education at Vinnitsa, where he graduated from the Gimnazjum Podolskie (Podole Gymnasium).

He first studied music with his father Ignacy, a violinist, composer and music director. Beginning in 1825 he studied in Warsaw with Józef Elsner, at first privately, then in 1826–28 at the Warsaw Conservatory, where he was a classmate of Frédéric Chopin.

In 1835, he won second prize in a composition competition for his Symphony No. 2 in C minor, Op. 15. This symphony was later called "Symphony in the Characteristic Spirit of Polish Music" and movements were conducted by Felix Mendelssohn. In 1845 Dobrzyński toured Germany as a soloist and also conducted operas and concerts.

In 1857 he founded "Ignacy Feliks Dobrzyński's Polish Orchestra" (Orkiestra Polska Ignacego Feliksa Dobrzyńskiego), which comprised leading members of the orchestra of Warsaw's Grand Theatre. In 1858–60 he participated in a committee established to found a Music Institute. He also became a member of the Lwów Music Society.

He died in Warsaw on 9 October 1867, at the age of 60.

== Works ==
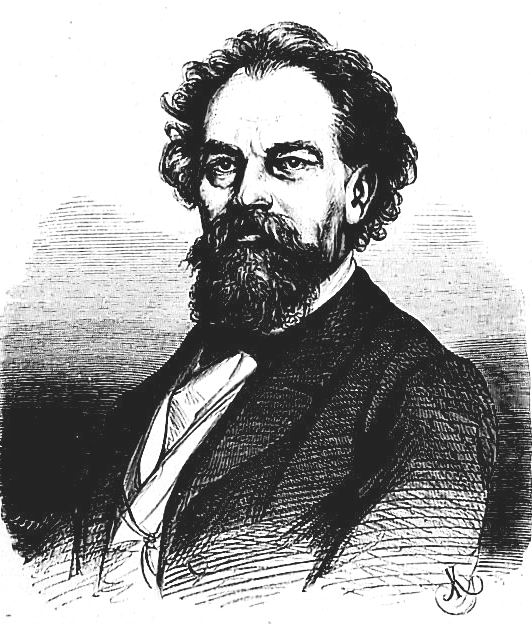
Dobrzyński. Portrait by Juliusz Kossak, 1865.

Dobrzyński's compositions included:

- an opera, Monbar czyli Flibustierowie (Monbar, or the Filibusters), Op. 30, 1836-8
- incidental music for performances of Victor Hugo's Les Burgraves, Op. 70, 1860, to Adam Mickiewicz's Konrad Wallenrod, Op. 69 (unpublished), 1859–64; Sztuka i handel (Art and Trade), music to a comedy (1861)
- a cantata (Op. 44) for soprano, mixed choir and orchestra
- symphonies (Op. 11 (1829), and Op. 15 in C minor (1831))
- an orchestral fantasia
- a piano concerto, Op. 2, 1824, and a Rondo à la Polacca, Op. 6 for piano and orchestra (ca. 1827)
- chamber music, most notably a sextet for two violins, viola, two cellos and double bass in E♭, Op. 39; three string quartets (Op. 7 in E minor, Op. 8 in D minor and Op. 13 in E); a piano trio (Op. 17); Duo for Clarinet and Piano (composed in the mid-1840s), Op. 47; and two string quintets (in F major, Op. 20; in A minor, Op. 40)
- Fantasies for violin and orchestra (Op. 32, ca. 1839) and for trumpet and orchestra (Op. 35), among other concerted works
- piano pieces
- lieder.

One of his crowning successes was his Symfonia charakterystyczna (Characteristic Symphony, 1831), which won a prize in Vienna in 1834.

== See also ==
- List of Poles
