= Ignacy Dobrzyński =

Ignacy Dobrzyński (2 February 1779 – 17 August 1841) was a Polish musician (violinist) and composer. He was the father of Ignacy Feliks Dobrzyński and Edward Dobrzyński.

== Life ==
Born in Volynia, at the age of 18 he was already playing the first violin in count orchestra of Józef August Iliński in Romaniv, where he composed several operas and ballet music. In 1799–1817 he was conductor of this orchestra. In 1817–1825 he taught music at the Polish Gymnasium in Vinnytsia. He then spent some years in Kremenets, before moving to Warsaw, where his son was already a renowned composer. He participated in quartet performances and in church music.

He married Eudoksja z Karelinów, daughter of a wind orchestra leader in Saint Petersburg. Dobrzyński was buried at the Powązki Cemetery.

== Compositions ==
He composed many pieces, both for orchestra and for solo piano. Most notable are the polonaises expressing the spirit of old Poland (duch staropolski).
