= Bohdan Dobrzański Institute of Agrophysics of the Polish Academy of Sciences =

Agrophysics research and higher education institute in Lublin, Poland

- Instytut Agrofizyki im. Bohdana Dobrzańskiego Polskiej Akademii Nauk (IA PAN)
- Purpose: Research and education
- Location: Doświadczalna 4, 20-290 Lublin, Poland
- Coordinates: 51.22048°N 22.62628°E
- Parent organization: Polish Academy of Sciences
- Website: www.ipan.lublin.pl

The Bohdan Dobrzański Institute of Agrophysics of the Polish Academy of Sciences (IA PAS, Instytut Agrofizyki im. Bohdana Dobrzańskiego Polskiej Akademii Nauk, IA PAN) is a public research and higher education institution dedicated to the study of agrophysics, agricultural sciences and research on physical problems of agriculture. The Institute publishes two English-language scientific journals, the quarterly Acta Agrophysica (since 1993) and the semi-annual Polish Journal of Soil Science (since 1968).

The Institute promotes agrophysics as a part of agricultural sciences that uses knowledge and methods of basic sciences such as physics, biology and chemistry for solving contemporary problems in agronomy. It develops new methods, experimental and numerical tools, products, and technological and service innovations for agriculture and for exploitation of the agricultural resources.

The Institute is funded by the Polish Ministry of Science and Higher Education. It is located in Lublin, Poland. Its email addresses include sekretariat@ipan.lublin.pl and agrof@demeter.ipan.lublin.pl. Its telephone numbers include (48 81) 744 50 61 (to 66), and its facsimile line is (48 81) 744 50 67.

== Mission ==
The Institute's mission addresses

- Research and development in agricultural sciences (agricultural environment, agri-food biomaterials, bio-energy) and dissemination of achieved results,
- Education of research staff for industry and science in order to make them capable of solving contemporary problems of agriculture and developing bio-economy, and
- Cooperation and participation in inter- and trans-disciplinary collaborations with researchers, industry and public actors for ensuring sustainable exploitation of agricultural resources, and therefore, contributing to regional, European and worldwide bio-economy.

== Research and development ==
Research and development at the Institute is both inter- and trans-disciplinary, involving the soil-plant-atmosphere system and distributed in three areas:

- Agricultural Environment, including ensuring sustainable management and exploitation of the soil-plant-atmosphere system, development of new climate services and prediction of climate change, and mitigation of the impact of agriculture on climate change,
- Agri-Food Biomaterials, including ensuring sustainable food security, exploitation of agri-food biomaterials for designing new food and non-food products, and waste valorization, and
- Bio-Energy, including sustainable exploitation of agri-food biomass for bio-energy production, and optimization processes in production of bio-energy.

== History ==
The Institute was founded in 1968 by Professor Bohdan Dobrzański, PAS, who was its director until 1979. Originally with the rank of a basic research institution, in 1986 it was elevated to the full rank of an Institute in the structure of the Polish Academy of Sciences. In 1990 the Institute was named after its founder. In 1989 the Institute was awarded the right to confer the degree of PhD, and in 1992 the degree of DSc in the field of agronomy-agrophysics. In 1998 the Institute became a legal entity and was entered in the Register of Institutes of the Polish Academy of Sciences.
