= Romaniv Raion =

Former subdivision of Zhytomyr Oblast, Ukraine

Romaniv Raion Романівський район
- Raion
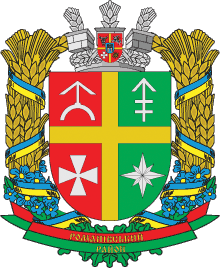
- Flag Coat of arms

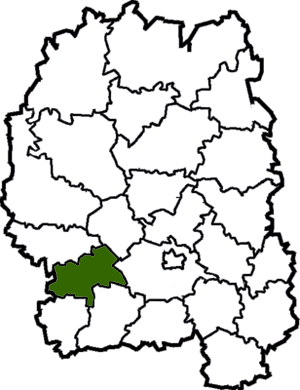
- Coordinates: 50°9′12″N 27°55′59″E
- Country: Ukraine
- Oblast: Zhytomyr Oblast
- Disestablished: 18 July 2020
- Admin. center: Romaniv
- Subdivisions: List: 0 — city councils; 3 — settlement councils; — rural councils; Number of localities: 0 — cities; 3 — urban-type settlements; — villages; — rural settlements

Area
  - Total: 927.9 km^{2} (358.3 sq mi)

Population (2020)
  - Total: 27,334 ▼
  - Density: 29.46/km^{2} (76.30/sq mi)
- Time zone: UTC+02:00 (EET)
  - Summer (DST): UTC+03:00 (EEST)
- Area code: +380

Romaniv Raion (Ukrainian: Романівський район), formerly Dzerzhynsk Raion, was a raion (district) of Zhytomyr Oblast, northern Ukraine. Its administrative centre was located at Romaniv. The raion covered an area of 1,037 square kilometres (400 mi^{2}). The raion was abolished on 18 July 2020 as part of the administrative reform of Ukraine, which reduced the number of raions of Zhytomyr Oblast to four. The area of Romaniv Raion was merged into Zhytomyr Raion. The last estimate of the raion population was 27,334 (2020 est.)
