= Dobrinski =

Dobrinski or Dobrinsky, feminine: Dobrinskaya is an East Slavic form of the Polish surname Dobrzyński. Ukrainian forms: Dobrynsky, Dobrynska Notable people with the surname include:

- Cynthia Dobrinski (1950–2021), American composer and arranger of handbell music
- Isaac Dobrinsky (1891–1973), Polish-French sculptor and painter
- Mike Dobrinski, American politician
- Nataliya Dobrynska, Ukrainian athlete
