= Edward Dobrzyński =

Polish musician and composer

Edward Dobrzyński (died 21 November 1858) was a Polish musician, violinist, pianist and composer, the son of Ignacy Dobrzyński and the brother of Ignacy Feliks Dobrzyński.

He taught music in Kiev, and usually played piano accompaniment for travelling musicians and second violin parts at church.

== Compositions ==
- 3 Fantasies for piano with string quartet or small orchestra
- 2 Polonaises for piano 4-hands
- String quartet
