= Dobrzhansky =

Dobrzhansky or Dobzhansky (Russian: Добржанский, Добжанский) is a Russian phonetic transliteration of the Polish surname Dobrzański. Notable people with the surname include:

- Aleksandr Dobrzhansky (1873–1937), Russian sports shooter
- Lyubov Dobrzhanskaya (1905–1980), Soviet actress
- Theodosius Dobzhansky (1900–1975), Russian Russian-born American geneticist and evolutionary biologist
