= University of Agricultural Sciences =

University of Agricultural Sciences could refer to one of three state agriculture universities in India started on the land grant university pattern.

- University of Agricultural Sciences, Dharwad
- University of Agricultural Sciences, Bangalore
- University of Agricultural Sciences, Raichur
