= Agrominerals =

Minerals important in agriculture and horticulture

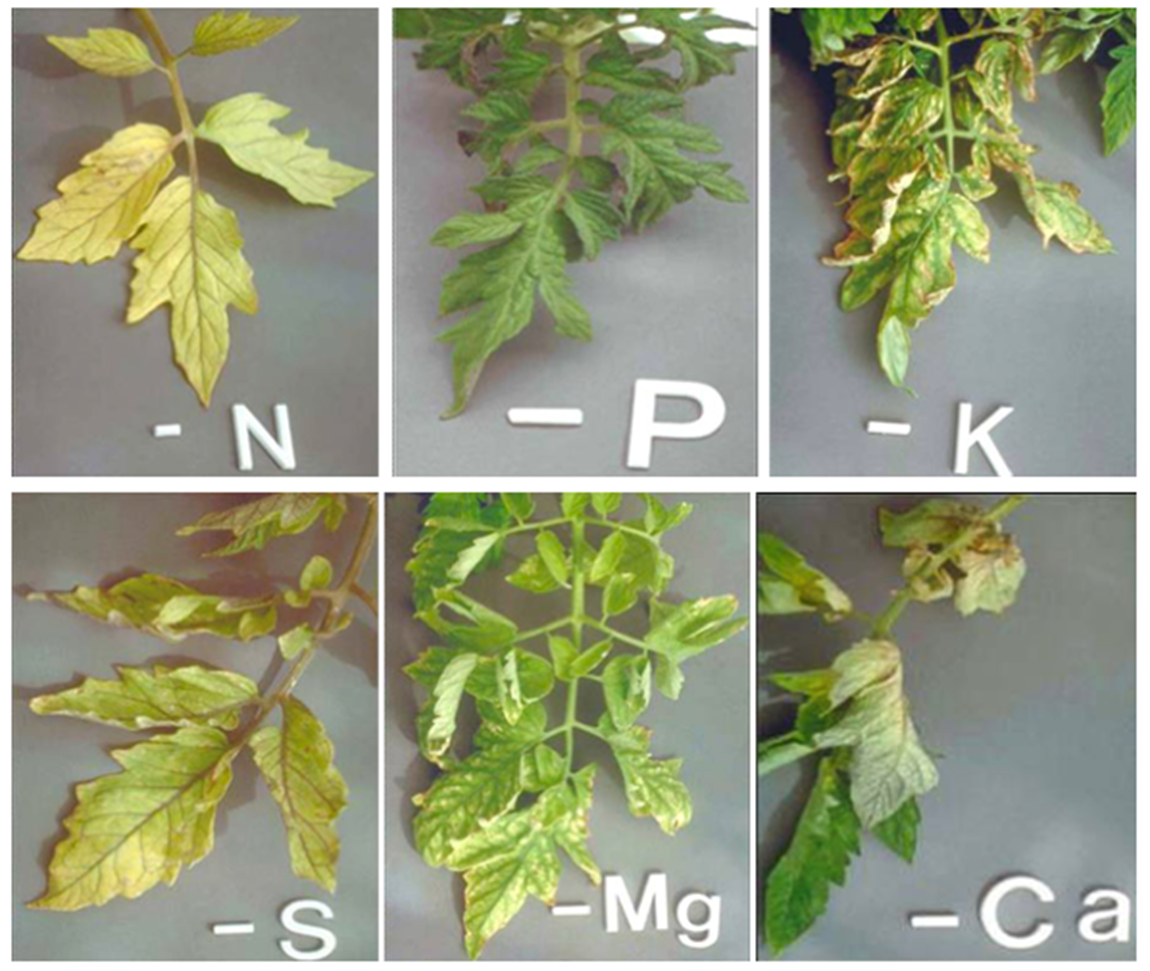
Look of tomato plants when missing essential nutrients they need

Agrominerals (also known as stone bread or petrol fertilizer) are minerals of importance to agriculture and horticulture industries for they can provide essential plant nutrients. Some agrominerals occur naturally or can be processed to be used as alternative fertilizers or soil amendments. The term agromineral was created in the 19th century and is now one of the leading research topics for sustainable agriculture. These geomaterials are used to replenish the nutrients and amend soils. Agrominerals started with small uses most often seen in hobbyist gardening but are moving to a much larger scale such as commercial farming operations that take up 100's acres of land. In this transition the focus changed to be more on ground nutrients, mainly on the three major plant nutrients nitrogen (N), phosphorus (P), and potassium (K). Two of the three elements are only being harvested from a geomaterial called potash. Alternative sources are being researched, due to potash finite supply and cost.

The process of using agrominerals starts with crushing rocks into a "rock powder," than using the powder to replenish soil nutrients. The process of replenishing mineral levels in a soil is called soil remineralization. While studying alternative ways to replenish ground nutrients, it has been found that agrominerals can also help mitigate other issues such climate change, water preservation and soil management.

== History ==
The study of agrominerals is termed agrogeology, and agrogeologists are concerned with issues such as the replenishment of soil fertility in areas where agrominerals have been depleted by unsustainable farming methods. With current farming practice, the system is expected to have high crop production with low soil quality. Over time with this type of practice, ground nutrients have been depleted which has led to an increase in chemical fertilizer usage. Chemical fertilizers have been shown to have runoff and it can contaminate groundwaters and are not economically feasible for third world countries. One of the major sources for chemical fertilizers is potash ore. The other concern with the potash ore is the supply is finite and is running out, hence the increase in pricing. Potash is one of the major sources for potassium and phosphorus and one of the original agrominerals. Finding alternative sources for these agrominerals was a concept that was created to focus on soil remediation, to increase productivity in a low-cost manner.

At first agrominerals were used to help recreate soil conditions for exotic plants. These were simple practices that occur on a much smaller scale. These include using perlite to enhance the aeration of the soil, using pumice to control evaporation while one can use vermiculites and zeolites to store moisture. This soil modification was the start of the agromineral concept and has evolved into looking for alternative sources to obtain the three major nutrient elements. Remineralization has been the term created for implementing rock powders into soils as a source of nutrients. This process has been implemented into bigger operations and has found great success in places like Brazil, Germany, Norway, South Africa, Sri Lanka, and Uganda.

Change in potash ore between 1800 and 2015

== Sources ==
The original agromineral is potash, it is how chemical fertilizers get it potassium and phosphorus nutrients in the present day. Due to such a high demand, the ore is running in low supply which has increased its market value. The biggest limiting factor is potassium, despite being the fourth most abundant element in the Earth's crust it has only one major source that being potash. One of the popular alternative ideas to get away from the use of chemical fertilizer is spreading rock powders in the field as a source of nutrients. One of the major research areas involve looking feldspars and feldspathoids and determining which would more efficient to use. In one of the studies it showed that the feldspathoid nepheline had a much higher dissolution rate making it more efficient source of potassium than other rocks that are much more potassium-rich like granitic rocks.

There is a push to move away from chemical fertilizers since it has been connected to groundwater pollution. There has been a shift into looking at grinding rocks into a powder that can be incorporated into the ground as a new way to add nutrients to the soil. The idea behind rock powder originated from the idea that rock weather and is how nutrients were originally put in the soil; the soil is weathered rock. With this concept it has been determined that the rock source is very important because the rock can have unwanted elements that can be toxic for both the plant and the humans ingesting it. Research has been done on rocks such as basalt and dacite; each rock had their pros and cons. The success of the rock powder can be affected by crop cycle. For example, basalt was effective when it came to long-cycle crops, but short-cycle crops it was not as effective as chemical fertilizers. With some rock powders it can take anywhere between 1-5 years to show results. The biggest contributions to rocks being an effective rock powder comes down to mineralogy and chemical composition. Once rock sources that have the proper elements and effectiveness is found, the limitation to rock powders then becomes how it is ground. Grinding a mineral, like olivine, to a particle size that would be effective in the ground (1μm), takes about 1.5 gigajoules per ton of rock. Research will be needed to find more efficient ways to crush rock for rock-powders to be a sustainable solution for replenishing plant nutrients.

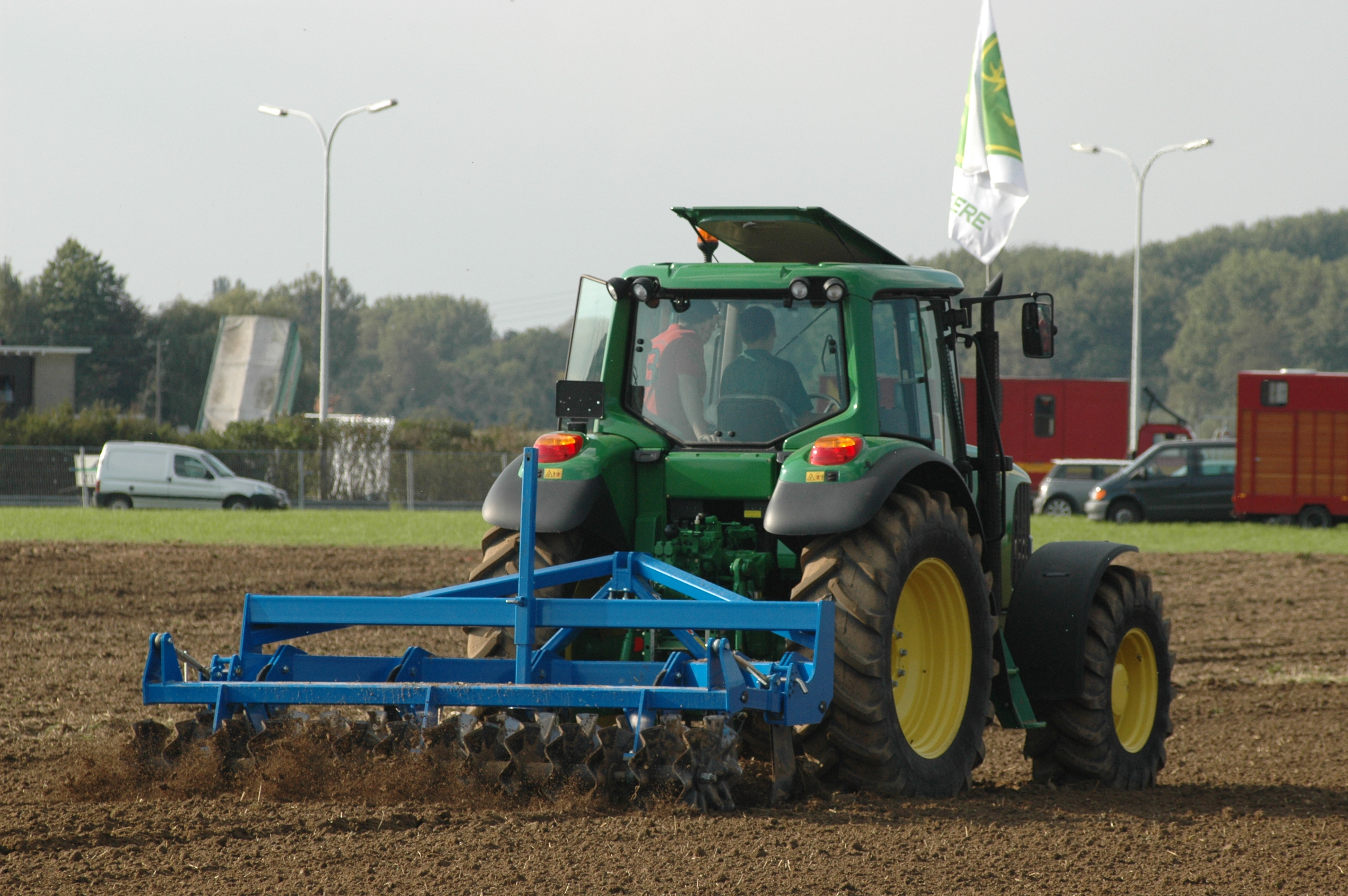
Tillage is a common way to incorporate rock powder into the soil

== Remineralization ==
Agrominerals allow for nutrients to be added to the soil after a long history of crops depleting it. The agriculture industry is suffering from its high loss rate in arable layers in the soil and ground nutrients compared to the natural replenishment rate. Remineralization looks into the process of taking rock powders and incorporating it into the soil as a way to replenish the nutrients in the ground. With rock powder the plant absorbs only what it needs, and any unused minerals will remain crystalized until it is used. While chemical fertilizers use dissolvable salts to deliver the nutrients to the plant, whatever is not absorb will run off into the nearest groundwater.

Rocks have become a cheap by-product in many industries and so there is a potential for a massive supply of viables rocks for a cheap price. Remineralization using rock powder can provide up to 5 years' worth of nutrients in a soil. When used in the combination with organic fertilizer, rock powder has proven to be just as effective as chemical fertilizer for a much smaller cost. It has even shown to have higher yields for long term crops. When using rock powder, the plants tended to look healthier, and it was found that the powder helps with holding moisture content. The effectiveness of the remineralization process is dependent on the mineralogy and chemistry of the rock powder, as well as the soil characteristics.

The challenge with rock powders is understanding the solubility rates of the rock powder. Rates are dependent on factors like organic matter, pH levels, secondary clay precipitation. This is a major area of research since their dissolution kinetics are not fully understood. One of the major challenges is recreating the field conditions in the lab, in many cases the solubility rates in the lab are 2-5 magnitudes higher than the ones in the field. It's important to fully understand what the mineralogy and chemical components of a rock. Volcanic rocks were thought to be a good source for rock powder but it was determined that it contains toxic elements as well. Research has been done into phosphate rocks, but these too have the issue of containing heavy and radioactive elements.

The use of rock powder in remineralization has the potential to help mitigate global warming. When nutrients from certain powders are absorbed, cations are released in the soil which reacts to with carbon dioxide to create carbonate minerals, which can serve as a carbon sink for the carbon cycle. With this discovery there has been a push to further look into remineralizations using rocks powders due to its sustainability potential both from a farming side and a global climate change side.

== See also ==
- Biogeochemistry
- Dietary mineral
- Edaphology
- Essential nutrient
- List of minerals
- Micronutrients
- Soil chemistry
- Sustainable agriculture
