= Bronisław Dobrzyński =

Polish musician

Bronisław Dobrzyński was a Polish musician, pianist and composer. He was the son of Ignacy Feliks Dobrzyński.

He arranged his father's Symphony No. 2 for piano 4-hands and composed several minor pieces. He is most known for his book on his father's life and work (Ignacy Dobrzyński w zakresie działalności dążącej do postępu muzyki w współczesnej jemu epoce. Warszawa: [s.n.], 1893).
