= René Dumont =

French engineer, sociologist, and politician

René Dumont (13 March 1904 – 18 June 2001) was a French engineer in agronomy, a sociologist, and an environmental politician.

== Biography ==
Dumont was born in Cambrai, Nord, in the north of France. His father was a professor in agriculture and his grandfather was a farmer. He graduated from the INA P-G, as an engineer in agronomy. First sent to Vietnam (1929) at the end of his studies, he was disgusted by colonialism and returned to Paris to spend most of his career as a professor of agricultural sciences (1933–74).

René Dumont started his career as a promoter of the use of chemical fertilizers and mechanisation. He wrote articles in La Terre Française (Pétainist weekly journal), favoring agricultural corporatism. However, he was one of the first to denounce damages from the Green Revolution ("Révolution Verte") and to fight agricultural productivism. He was an expert with the United Nations and FAO, and wrote about 30 books. He traveled widely and had a good understanding of farming issues in underdeveloped countries.

He advocated:

- demographic control
- energy savings
- international cooperation to help poor nations
- soil quality preservation and remediation

He considered development not to be so much a question of money, fertilizer, or seeds, but a careful balance of the three. He advocated relations between humans and their fields that relied foremost on relations between humans themselves, social relationships being the basis for proper agricultural and industrial development. Finally, he believed the basis for good social relationships between humans was good relationships between men and women, thus arguing demographic control relied on female emancipation.

Ahead of his time, the most famous French agronomist, well known for his red-pullover, surprised French people by showing on TV an apple and a glass of water, telling them how precious these natural resources were, and predicting the future price of oil. Dumont was one of the first to explain the consequences of what was to be called globalization, demographic explosion, productivism, pollution, shantytowns, malnutrition, rift between northern and southern countries. He was also one of the first to use the term "développement durable" (sustainable development).

He was one of the signatories of the agreement to convene a convention for drafting a world constitution. As a result, for the first time in human history, a World Constituent Assembly convened to draft and adopt a Constitution for the Federation of Earth.

He ran for President in 1974 as the first ecologist candidate, and won 1.32% of the votes. His campaign director was Brice Lalonde. That election opened the way to political ecology. The French political ecology was founded by Dumont and is under-developed countries oriented, against war, against capitalism and for solidarity. Some consider it not sufficiently rooted in deep ecology.

Dumont is considered to be the forefather of the French Green Party. In a statement, France's Green Party called Dumont "the man who made it possible to bring environmental policies in a direct and natural manner into the political world".

He wrote a best-selling book, L’Afrique noire est mal partie (1962).

Dumont was a founding member of ATTAC.

He died in 2001 in Fontenay-sous-Bois.

== Writings (selection) ==
- Cuba, Socialism and Development, Grove Press, 1970
- Cuba, ¿es socialista? Editorial Tiempo Nuevo S.A., Venezuela, 1970
- Voyages en France d'un agronome, Nouv. éd. rev. et augm., Paris: Génin, 1956
- Révolution dans les campagnes chinoises, Paris: Éditions du Seuil, 1957
- Terres vivantes, Paris: Plon, 1961. English translation Lands Alive, London: Merlin Press, 1964
- L’Afrique noire est mal partie, 1962. English translation False Start in Africa, New York: Praeger, 1966; London: Earthscan, 1988.
- Nous allons à la famine, 1966. English translation The Hungry Future, New York: Praeger, 1969
- Types of Rural Economy: Studies in World Agriculture, London: Methuen, 1970
- Notes sur les implications sociales de la "révolution verte" dans quelques pays d'Afrique, Genève, 1971
- La campagne de René Dumont et du mouvement écologique: naissance de l'écologie politique; déclarations, interviews, tracts, manifestes, articles, rapports, sondages, récits et nombreux autres textes, Paris: Pauvert, 1974
- l'Utopie ou la Mort, 1973. English translation Utopia or Else ..., Universe Pub, 1975
- Agronome de la faim, Paris: Laffont, 1974
- Chine, la révolution culturale, Paris: Seuil, 1976
- L'Afrique étranglée, 1980, Nouv. éd., rev., corr. et mis à jour: Paris: Seuil, 1982. English translation Stranglehold on Africa, London: Deutsch, 1983
- (with Nicholas Cohen), The Growth of Hunger: a new politics of agriculture, London: Boyars, 1980 - This book is based on René Dumont's ideas as contained in the 1975 publication La croissance de la famine.
- Finis Les Lendemains Qui Chantent
  - T.1 : Albanie, Pologne, Nicaragua, Paris: Seuil, 1983
  - T.2 : Surpeuplée, totalitaire, la Chine décollectivise, Paris: Seuil, 1984
  - T.3 : Bangladesh-Nepal, "L'Aide" Contre Le développement, Paris: Seuil, 1985
- Pour l'Afrique, j'accuse: le journal d'un agronome au Sahel en voie de destruction, Paris: Plon, 1986
- Un monde intolérable: le libéralisme en question, Paris: Seuil, 1988
- Démocratie pour l'Afrique: la longue marche de l'Afrique noire vers la liberté, Paris: Seuil, 1991
- La culture du riz dans le delta du Tonkin, Paris: Maison des Sciences de l'Homme, 1995

== See also ==
- Alain Lipietz
