= Dobriany, Lviv Raion, Lviv Oblast =

Rural locality in Lviv Oblast, Ukraine

Dobriany Добряни
- Village
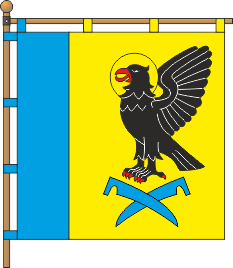
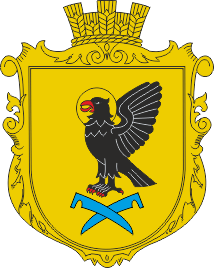
- Flag Coat of arms

- Location within Lviv Oblast
- Coordinates: 49°45′0″N 23°30′20″E
- Country: Ukraine
- Oblast: Lviv Oblast
- District: Lviv Raion
- District: Horodok urban hromada
- Established: 1437

Area
  - Total: 0.319 km^{2} (0.123 sq mi)
- Elevation: 250 m (820 ft)

Population (2001)
  - Total: 987
- Time zone: UTC+2 (EET)
  - Summer (DST): UTC+3 (EEST)
- Postal code: 81530
- Area code: +380 3231

Dobriany (Ukrainian: Добряни) is a village in Lviv Raion, Lviv Oblast in western Ukraine. It belongs to Horodok urban hromada, one of the hromadas of Ukraine.

Until 18 July 2020, Dobriany was located in Horodok Raion. The raion was abolished in July 2020 as part of the administrative reform of Ukraine, which reduced the number of raions of Lviv Oblast to seven. The area of Horodok Raion was merged into Lviv Raion.
