= Romaniv =

Rural locality in Zhytomyr Oblast, Ukraine

Romaniv Романів
- Rural settlement
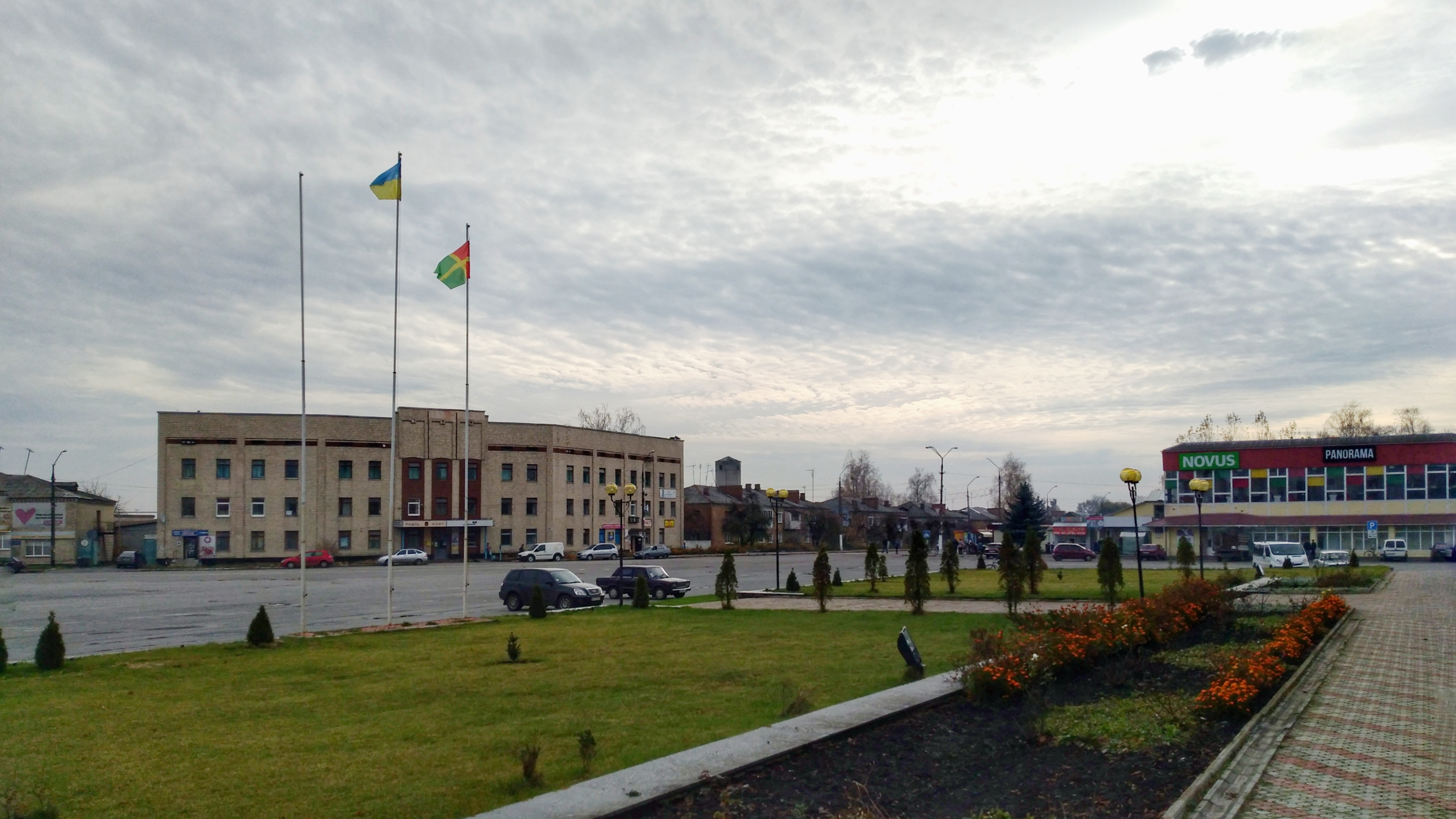
- Central Square of Romaniv

- Location of Romaniv Romaniv (Ukraine)
- Coordinates: 50°8′57″N 27°56′0″E
- Country: Ukraine
- Oblast: Zhytomyr Oblast
- Raion: Zhytomyr Raion
- Founded: 1471
- Magdeburg rights: 1817
- Urban-type settlement status: 10 December 1923

Government
  - Mayor: Vasyl Vasyliovych Bilinets

Area
  - Total: 74 km^{2} (29 sq mi)
- Elevation: 238 m (781 ft)

Population (2022)
  - Total: 7,226 ▲
  - Density: 98/km^{2} (250/sq mi)
- Postal code: 13001, 13002, 13003, 13004 and 13005
- Area code: +380 4146

Romaniv (Ukrainian: Романів; Dzerzhynsk in 1933–2003) is a rural settlement in Zhytomyr Raion, Zhytomyr Oblast, Ukraine. Prior to the 2020 administrative reform, it was the administrative center of the former Romaniv Raion. Their estimated population was 7,226. (2022 estimate)

== History ==
Within the Russian Empire, Romaniv was part of the Novograd-Volynsky Uyezd of the Volhynia Governorate.

Until 26 January 2024, Romaniv was designated urban-type settlement; after, a new law entered into force which abolished this status, and Romaniv became a rural settlement.

=== History of the Jews of Romaniv ===
Source:

== Economy ==
Historically, Romaniv has been known as a centre of glass, textile and furniture industries, as well as wagon production.

== Gallery ==
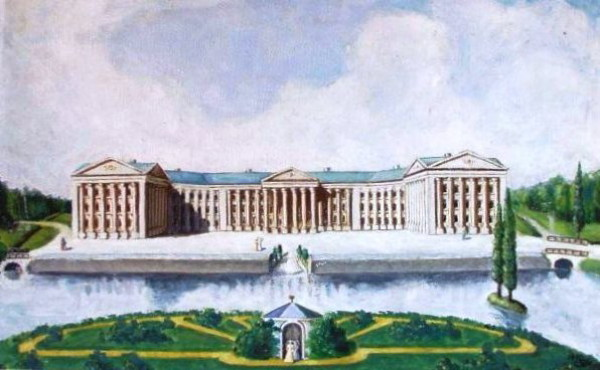
Historical depiction of Ilinski Palace in Romaniv, since then ruined

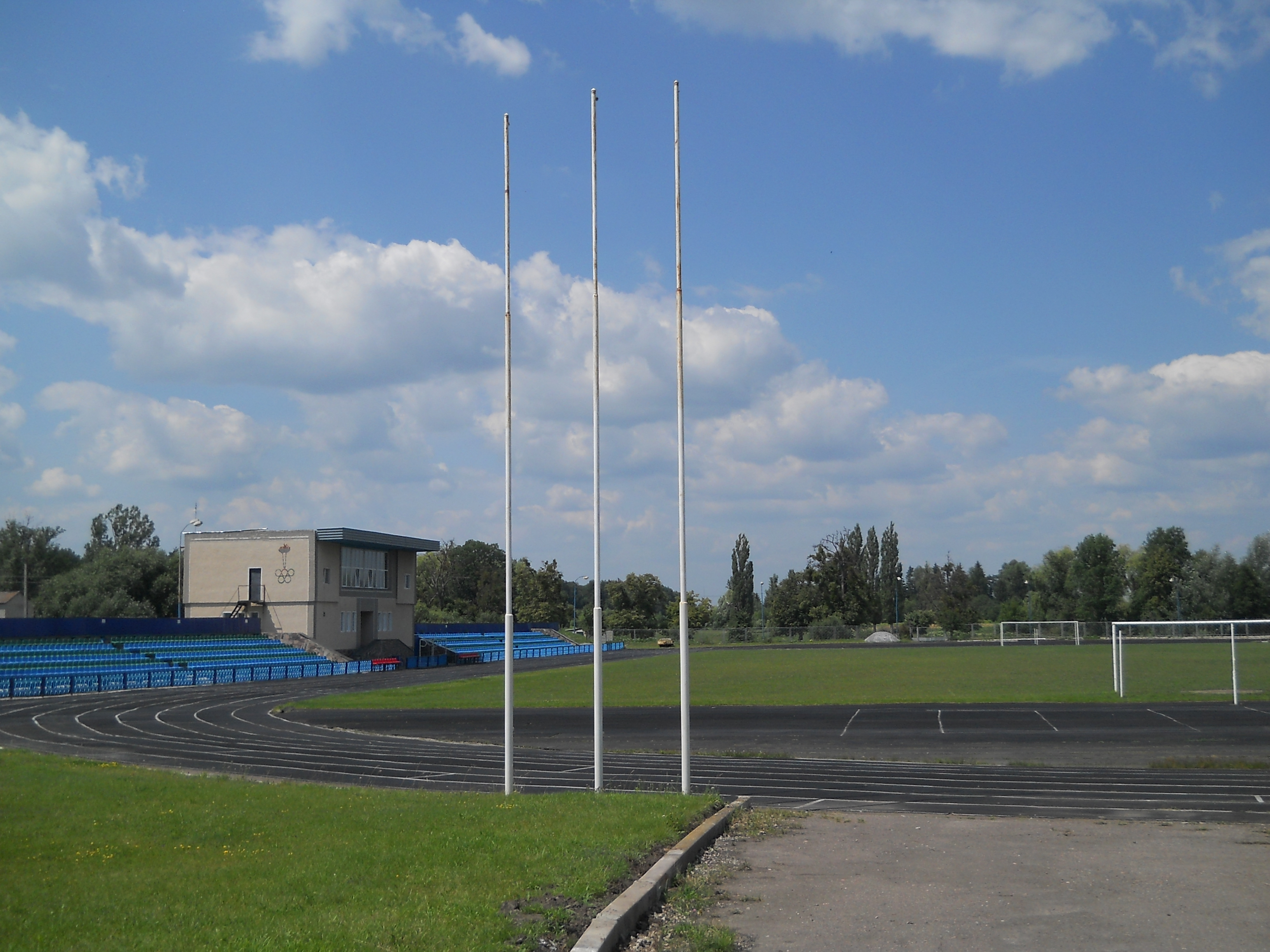
Central stadium

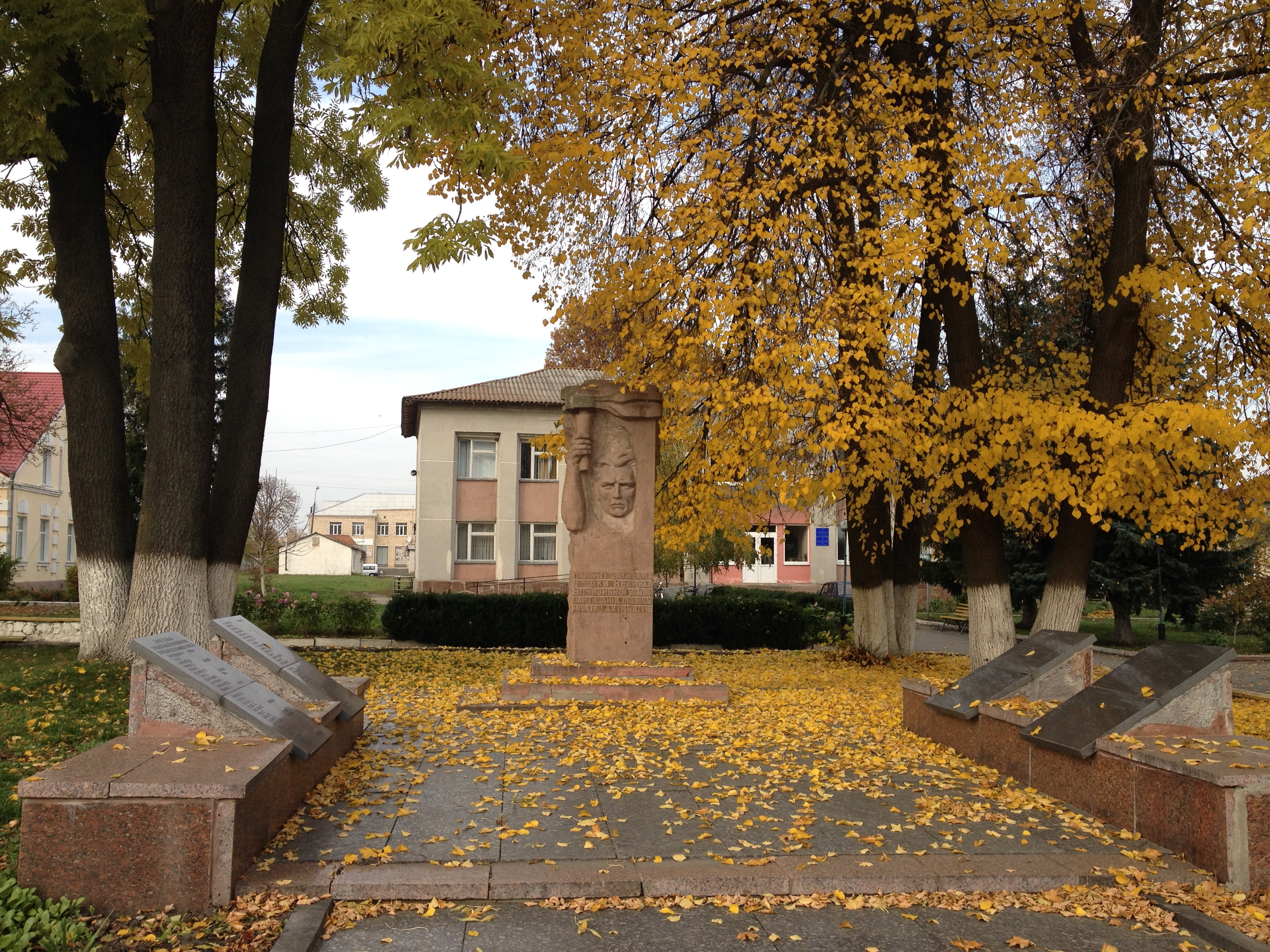
Soviet partisans memorial
