= Research Institute of Crop Production =

Czech research institute

Czech Agrifood Research Center
- Národní centrum zemědělského a potravinářského výzkumu, v. v. i.
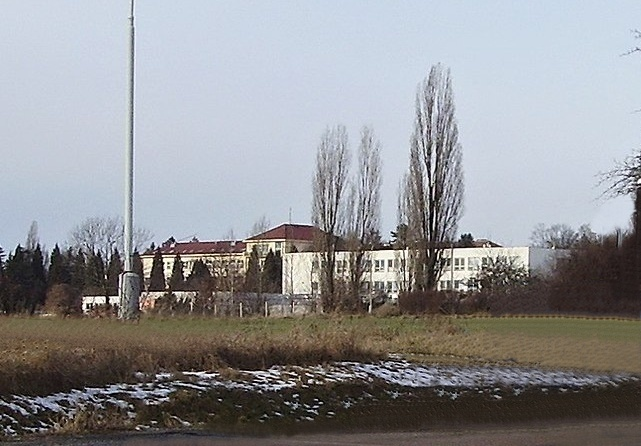
- Abbreviation: CARC
- Formation: 1951
- Location: Prague
- Coordinates: 50°5′11.55″N 14°18′7.32″E
- Region served: Czech Republic
- Main organ: Ministry of Agriculture (Czech Republic)
- Website: www.carc.cz

The Czech Agrifood Research Center (CARC; previously Crop Research Institute and before Research Institute of Crop Production) (Czech: Národní centrum zemědělského a potravinářského výzkumu, CARC) was established in 1951. During its 60-year existence, the CRIhas been the leading crop-production research institution within the Czech Republic. After most specialised research institutes in the Czech Republic were privatised in 1993, GRI remained the only state-independent institution pursuing both research and consulting activities focussed on problems associated with growing crop plants.

The CARC is a subsidised organisation. Its basic purpose is the development of scientific knowledge in the field of integrated crop production, the production of wholesome foodstuffs, and the development of conditions for sustainable agriculture and conservation of the environment.

Although the main CARC office is in Prague, various parts of the institute (14 experimental or research stations and separate laboratories) are located in different areas in the territory of the Czech Republic.

In 2025 the former Crop Research Institute was merged with Research Institute of Agricultural Technology (Czech: Výzkumný ústav zemědělské techniky, VÚZT) and Food Research Institute Prague (Czech: Výzkumný ústav potravinářský Praha, VÚPP)
