= Theoretical production ecology =

Theoretical production ecology tries to quantitatively study the growth of crops. The plant is treated as a kind of biological factory, which processes light, carbon dioxide, water, and nutrients into harvestable parts. Main parameters kept into consideration are temperature, sunlight, standing crop biomass, plant production distribution, nutrient and water supply.

== Modelling ==
Modelling is essential in theoretical production ecology. Unit of modelling usually is the crop, the assembly of plants per standard surface unit. Analysis results for an individual plant are generalised to the standard surface, e.g. the leaf area index is the projected surface area of all crop leaves above a unit area of ground.

=== Processes ===
The usual system of describing plant production divides the plant production process into at least five separate processes, which are influenced by several external parameters.

Two cycles of biochemical reactions constitute the basis of plant production, the light reaction and the dark reaction.

- In the light reaction, sunlight photons are absorbed by chloroplasts which split water into an electron, proton and oxygen radical which is recombined with another radical and released as molecular oxygen. The recombination of the electron with the proton yields the energy carriers NADH and ATP. The rate of this reaction often depends on sunlight intensity, leaf area index, leaf angle and amount of chloroplasts per leaf surface unit. The maximum theoretical gross production rate under optimum growth conditions is approximately 250 kg per hectare per day.
- The dark reaction or Calvin cycle ties atmospheric carbon dioxide and uses NADH and ATP to convert it into sucrose. The available NADH and ATP, as well as temperature and carbon dioxide levels determine the rate of this reaction. Together those two reactions are termed photosynthesis. The rate of photosynthesis is determined by the interaction of a number of factors including temperature, light intensity and carbon dioxide.
- The produced carbohydrates are transported to other plant parts, such as storage organs and converted into secondary products, such as amino acids, lipids, cellulose and other chemicals needed by the plant or used for respiration. Lipids, sugars, cellulose and starch can be produced without extra elements. The conversion of carbohydrates into amino acids and nucleic acids requires nitrogen, phosphorus and sulfur. Chlorophyll production requires magnesium, while several enzymes and coenzymes require trace elements. This means, nutrient supply influences this part of the production chain. Water supply is essential for transport, hence limits this too.
- The production centers, i.e. the leaves, are sources, the storage organs, growth tips or other destinations for the photosynthetic production are sinks. The lack of sinks can be a limiting factor for production too, as happens e.g. in apple orchards where insects or night frost have destroyed the blossoms and the produced assimilates cannot be converted into apples. Biennial and perennial plants employ the stored starch and fats in their storage organs to produce new leaves and shoots the next year.
- The amount of crop biomass and the relative distribution of biomass over leaves, stems, roots and storage organs determines the respiration rate. The amount of biomass in leaves determines the leaf area index, which is important in calculating the gross photosynthetic production.
- extensions to this basic model can include insect and pest damage, intercropping, climatic changes, etc.

=== Parameters ===
Important parameters in theoretical production models thus are:

Climate

- Temperature – The temperature determines the speed of respiration and the dark reaction. A high temperature combined with a low intensity of sunlight means a high loss by respiration. A low temperature combined with a high intensity of sunlight means that NADH and ATP heap up but cannot be converted into glucose because the dark reaction cannot process them swiftly enough.
- Light – Light, also called photosynthetic Active Radiation (PAR) is the energy source for green plant growth. PAR powers the light reaction, which provides ATP and NADPH for the conversion of carbon dioxide and water into carbohydrates and molecular oxygen. When temperature, moisture, carbon dioxide and nutrient levels are optimal, light intensity determines maximum production level.
- Carbon dioxide levels – Atmospheric carbon dioxide is the sole carbon source for plants. About half of all proteins in green leaves have the sole purpose of capturing carbon dioxide.

Although CO_{2} levels are constant under natural circumstances [on the contrary, CO2 concentration in the atmosphere has been increasing steadily for 200 years], CO_{2} fertilization is common in greenhouses and is known to increase yields by on average 24% [a specific value, e.g., 24%, is meaningless without specification of the "low" and "high" CO2 levels being compared].
C_{4} plants like maize and sorghum can achieve a higher yield at high solar radiation intensities, because they prevent the leaking of captured carbon dioxide due to the spatial separation of carbon dioxide capture and carbon dioxide use in the dark reaction. This means that their photorespiration is almost zero. This advantage is sometimes offset by a higher rate of maintenance respiration. In most models for natural crops, carbon dioxide levels are assumed to be constant.

Crop

- Standing crop biomass – Unlimited growth is an exponential process, which means that the amount of biomass determines the production. Because an increased biomass implies higher respiration per surface unit and a limited increase in intercepted light, crop growth is a sigmoid function of crop biomass.
- Plant production distribution – Usually only a fraction of the total plant biomass consists of useful products, e.g. the seeds in pulses and cereals, the tubers in potato and cassava, the leaves in sisal and spinach etc. The yield of usable plant portions will increase when the plant allocates more nutrients to this parts, e.g. the high-yielding varieties of wheat and rice allocate 40% of their biomass into wheat and rice grains, while the traditional varieties achieve only 20%, thus doubling the effective yield.

Different plant organs have a different respiration rate, e.g. a young leaf has a much higher respiration rate than roots, storage tissues or stems do. There is a distinction between "growth respiration" and "maintenance respiration".
Sinks, such as developing fruits, need to be present. They are usually represented by a discrete switch, which is turned on after a certain condition, e.g. critical daylength has been met.

Care

- Water supply – Because plants use passive transport to transfer water and nutrients from their roots to the leaves, water supply is essential to growth, even so that water efficiency rates are known for different crops, e.g. 5000 for sugar cane, meaning that each kilogram of produced sugar requires up to 5000 liters of water.
- Nutrient supply – Nutrient supply has a twofold effect on plant growth. A limitation in nutrient supply will limit biomass production as per Liebig's Law of the Minimum. With some crops, several nutrients influence the distribution of plant products in the plants. A nitrogen gift is known to stimulate leaf growth and therefore can work adversely on the yield of crops which are accumulating photosynthesis products in storage organs, such as ripening cereals or fruit-bearing fruit trees.

== Phases in crop growth ==
Theoretical production ecology assumes that the growth of common agricultural crops, such as cereals and tubers, usually consists of four (or five) phases:

- Germination – Agronomical research has indicated a temperature dependence of germination time (GT, in days). Each crop has a unique critical temperature (CT, dimension temperature) and temperature sum (dimensions temperature times time), which are related as follows.

$$GT = \frac{TS}{\sum_{k=1}^N (T-T_\text{crit})}$$

When a crop has a temperature sum of e.g. 150 °C·d and a critical temperature of 10 °C, it will germinate in 15 days when temperature is 20 °C, but in 10 days when temperature is 25 °C. When the temperature sum exceeds the threshold value, the germination process is complete.

- Initial spread – In this phase, the crop does not cover the field yet. The growth of the crop is linearly dependent on leaf area index, which in its turn is linearly dependent on crop biomass. As a result, crop growth in this phase is exponential.
- Total coverage of field – in this phase, growth is assumed to be linearly dependent on incident light and respiration rate, as nearly 100% of all incident light is intercepted. Typically, the Leaf Area Index (LAI) is above two to three in this phase. This phase of vegetative growth ends when the plant gets a certain environmental or internal signal and starts generative growth (as in cereals and pulses) or the storage phase (as in tubers).
- Allocation to storage organs – in this phase, up to 100% of all production is directed to the storage organs. Generally, the leaves are still intact and as a result, gross primary production stays the same. Prolonging this phase, e.g. by careful fertilization, water and pest management results directly in a higher harvest.
- Ripening – in this phase, leaves and other production structures slowly die off. Their carbohydrates and proteins are transported to the storage organs. As a result, the LAI and, hence, the primary production decreases.

== Existing plant production models ==
Plant production models exist in varying levels of scope (cell, physiological, individual plant, crop, geographical region, global) and of generality: the model can be crop-specific or be more generally applicable. In this section the emphasis will be on crop-level based models as the crop is the main area of interest from an agronomical point of view.

As of 2005, several crop production models are in use. The crop growth model SUCROS has been developed during more than 20 years and is based on earlier models. Its latest revision known dates from 1997. The IRRI and Wageningen University more recently developed the rice growth model ORYZA2000. This model is used for modeling rice growth. Both crop growth models are open source. Other more crop-specific plant growth models exist as well.

=== SUCROS ===
SUCROS is programmed in the Fortran computer programming language. The model can and has been applied to a variety of weather regimes and crops. Because the source code of Sucros is open source, the model is open to modifications of users with FORTRAN programming experience. The official maintained version of SUCROS comes into two flavours: SUCROS I, which has non-inhibited unlimited crop growth (which means that only solar radiation and temperature determine growth) and SUCROS II, in which crop growth is limited only by water shortage.

=== ORYZA2000 ===
The ORYZA2000 rice growth model has been developed at the IRRI in cooperation with Wageningen University. This model, too, is programmed in FORTRAN. The scope of this model is limited to rice, which is the main food crop for Asia.

=== Other models ===
The United States Department of Agriculture has sponsored a number of applicable crop growth models for various major US crops, such as cotton, soy bean, wheat and rice. Other widely used models are the precursor of SUCROS (SWATR), CERES, several incarnations of PLANTGRO, SUBSTOR, the FAO-sponsored CROPWAT, AGWATER, the erosion-specific model EPIC, and the cropping system CropSyst.

A less mechanistic growth and competition model, called the conductance model, has been developed, mainly at Warwick-HRI, Wellesbourne, UK. This model simulates light interception and growth of individual plants based on the lateral expansion of their crown zone areas. Competition between plants is simulated by a set algorithms related to competition for space and resultant light intercept as the canopy closes. Some versions of the model assume overtopping of some species by others. Although the model cannot take account of water or mineral nutrients, it can simulate individual plant growth, variability in growth within plant communities and inter-species competition. This model was written in Matlab. See Benjamin and Park (2007) Weed Research 47, 284–298 for a recent review.
