= Jay Laurence Lush =

American geneticist (1896–1982)

Jay L. Lush
- Born: January 3, 1896; Shambaugh, Iowa
- Died: May 1, 1982 (aged 86)
- Education: Kansas State Agricultural College (BSc); Kansas State (MSc) (1918); University of Wisconsin–Madison (PhD) (1922)
- Known for: Quantitative genetics
- Awards: National Medal of Science (1968); Wolf Prize in Agriculture (1979)
- Scientific career
- Fields: Genetics
- Institutions: Iowa State University
- Doctoral advisor: Leon J. Cole

Jay Laurence Lush (January 3, 1896 – May 1, 1982) was a pioneering animal geneticist who made important contributions to livestock breeding. He is sometimes known as the father of modern scientific animal breeding. Lush received National Medal of Science in 1968 and the Wolf Prize in 1979.

Lush was introduced to mathematics and genetics during his BSc studies of animal husbandry at the Kansas State Agricultural College (now Kansas State University). He completed his MSc in 1918 at Kansas State, and his PhD in genetics at the University of Wisconsin–Madison (1922).

Lush advocated breeding not based on subjective appearance of the animal, but on quantitative statistics and genetic information. Lush authored a classic textbook Animal Breeding Plans in 1937 which greatly influenced animal breeding around the world.

From 1930 to 1966, Lush was the Charles F. Curtiss Distinguished Professor in Agriculture at Iowa State University. He was elected to the United States National Academy of Sciences in 1967.

Lush won the Borden Award for research in dairy production from the American Dairy Science Association and both the Armour Award for animal breeding and genetics and the Morrison Award from the American Society of Animal Science. In 1979, he was awarded the Wolf Prize in Agriculture.

== Bibliography ==
- Lush, J.L. (1943). Animal Breeding Plans. Collegiate Press, Ames.
