= Outline of animal science =

Interdisciplinary science dealing with the biology of animals

The following outline is provided as an overview of and topical guide to animal science:

Animal science is described as "studying the biology of animals that are under the control of humankind". It can also be described as the production and management of farm animals. Historically, the degree was called animal husbandry and the animals studied were livestock species, like ruminant animals such as; cattle, sheep and goat, non-ruminant such as; pigs, poultry, rabbit, snails and horses are studied. Today, courses available look at a broader area, including companion animals, like dogs and cats, and many exotic species. Degrees in Animal Science are offered at a number of colleges and universities. Animal science degrees are often offered at land-grant universities, which will often have on-campus farms to give students hands-on experience with livestock animals.

== What types of thing is animal science? ==
Animal science can be described as all of the following:

- an academic discipline – branch of knowledge. It incorporates expertise, people, projects, communities, challenges, studies, inquiry, and research areas that are strongly associated with a given scholastic subject area or college department.
- branch of science – systematic enterprise that builds and organizes knowledge in the form of testable explanations and predictions about the universe.
  - branch of natural science – branch of science concerned with the description, prediction, and understanding of natural phenomena, based on observational and empirical evidence.
    - branch of biology – natural science concerned with the study of life and living organisms, including their structure, function, growth, evolution, distribution, identification and taxonomy.
      - branch of agricultural science – agricultural science is the broad multidisciplinary field of biology that encompasses the parts of exact, natural, economic and social sciences that are used in the practice and understanding of agriculture.
      - branch of zoology –
  - branch of applied science – discipline of science that applies existing scientific knowledge to develop more practical applications, like technology or inventions.
    - branch of agriculture – cultivation and breeding of animals, plants and fungi for food, fiber, biofuel, medicinal plants and other products used to sustain and enhance human life.

== Branches of Animal Science ==
- Animal behavior
- Animal health
  - Animal nutrition
  - Veterinary medicine
- Animal management
  - Animal products
  - Animal production
- Animal physiology
  - Animal genetics
  - Reproductive physiology
- Food science

== Areas of study in animal science ==
- Farm animals (livestock)
- Companion animals
  - Dogs
  - Cats
  - Horses
    - Horse anatomy
      - Equine reproductive system
    - Horse breeding
    - Horse care
      - Equine nutrition
        - Mare milk

== General animal science concepts ==
- Animal domestication, the artificial selection (breeding) of animals for human purposes.
  - Farm animals, animals that have been selected for their utility in an agricultural setting.
  - Pets, animals that have been selectively bred for their temperament and suitability as companions to humans.
  - Working animals, animals that have been selected for their ability to do useful work, such as transporting humans (draught animals).
- Animal physiology, the study of the mechanical, physical, and biochemical aspects of animal function.

== Animal science organizations ==
- American Registry of Professional Animal Scientists

== Animal science publications ==
- Animal
- Animal Reproduction Science
- Animal Science
- Animal Science Journal
- Indian Journal of Animal Sciences
- Journal of Animal and Feed Sciences
- Journal of Animal Science

== Persons influential in animal science ==
- Charles Darwin - English naturalist known for his theory of evolution by natural selection, foundational to modern biology.
- Jane Goodall - Renowned primatologist and anthropologist, famous for her studies on chimpanzees and conservation efforts.
- Eugenie Clark - Marine biologist known as the "Shark Lady," recognized for her research on shark behavior and marine conservation.
- Karl von Frisch - Nobel Prize-winning zoologist known for his work on honey bee communication and behavior.
- Daphne Sheldrick - Conservationist known for her work with orphaned elephants and founder of the David Sheldrick Wildlife Trust.
- Temple Grandin - Animal behavior expert and advocate for humane livestock handling practices, known for her work in animal welfare.
- Nikolaas Tinbergen - Dutch zoologist and ethologist who won the Nobel Prize for his research in animal behavior.

== See also ==
- Outline of agriculture
- Outline of zoology
  - List of animals
  - List of domesticated animals
  - List of meat animals
  - List of animals that have been cloned
