= Animal science (disambiguation) =

Animal science is a branch of agriculture focusing on animals used by humans.

Animal science may also refer to:

- Animal Science (journal), associated with the British Society of Animal Science
- Animal Science Journal, associated with the Japanese Society of Animal Science
- Journal of Animal Science, associated with the American Society of Animal Science
- Animal Science (later Xploration Animal Science), an American television show that was part of the Xploration Station programming block

== See also ==
- Animal (journal)
- Zoology (disambiguation)
- Animal studies (disambiguation)
