= Rohan Fernando (geneticist) =

American geneticist

Rohan L. Fernando
- Born: January 19, 1952
- Education: California State University, Fresno; University of Illinois at Urbana-Champaign
- Scientific career
- Fields: Animal breeding; Quantitative genetics; Statistical genetics
- Workplaces: Iowa State University (1996-present); University of Illinois at Urbana-Champaign (1985-1996)
- Doctoral advisor: Daniel Gianola
- Website: www.ans.iastate.edu/people/rohan-fernando

Rohan L. Fernando (born January 19, 1952) is a Sri Lankan American geneticist who is a professor of quantitative genetics in the Department of Animal Science at Iowa State University (ISU), US. Fernando's efforts have focused primarily on theory and methods for use of genetic markers in breeding, theory and methods for genetic evaluations of crossbred animals, methodology related to the estimation of genetic parameters and the prediction of genetic merit in populations undergoing selection and non-random mating, Bayesian methodology for analysis of unbalanced mixed model data, optimization of breeding programs, and use of computer simulation to study dynamics of genetic system.

== Early life and education ==
Fernando was born in Sri Lanka in 1952 where he was raised alongside his three brothers. His family owned land with livestock, such as dairy cows and poultry. This land was away from his home, so he only visited during holidays. Fernando had a passion for livestock in his younger years, and always considered his family's lifestyle to be a hobby as opposed to a job. His family encouraged him to obtain greater education, but since the public university in Sri Lanka was difficult to get into, they sent him and his three brothers to the United States. Another factor that went into the decision of pursuing education in the United States was Sri Lanka's political landscape at the time.

Fernando attended junior college from 1972 to 1975 at Aquinas College in Colombo, Sri Lanka, where he graduated with first class honors with a diploma in agriculture. Because he graduated with high distinction, in 1976 Fernando decided to pursue a bachelor's degree in agricultural science with an emphasis in animal science from California State University, Fresno.

Fernando graduated from California State University, Fresno, in 1978 and decided to pursue his master's degree in animal science at the University of Illinois at Urbana–Champaign (UIUC), under the guidance of Daniel Gianola. Upon his graduation in 1981, Fernando continued at UIUC for his PhD, which he completed in 1984. At UIUC, Fernando worked on selection and non-random mating for his thesis research.

== Career ==
Fernando accepted a research and teaching associate position with the Department of Animal Science at UIUC. In 1985, he became assistant professor of biometry and computer applications for the same department. After getting tenure and becoming associate professor in 1991, Fernando went on sabbatical through the Department of Biometry and Genetics at Louisiana State University Medical Center until 1992. In 1996, he joined Iowa State University as professor of quantitative genetics in the Department of Animal Science.

=== Scientific contributions ===
Fernando's contributions have been presented in over 120 peer-reviewed publications and over 70 invited talks, seminars and courses in more than 16 countries.

- Selection and non-random mating. In 1951, William Gemmell Cochran showed that when candidates and the data for each candidate are identically and independently distributed, truncation selection of candidates based on the conditional mean of breeding values maximizes the mean breeding value of the selected candidates. Fernando's PhD research provided an important extension to this result. When selection is for a constant proportion of candidates, he showed that selection based on the conditional mean maximizes the mean breeding value of the selected candidates without the requirement for candidates and the data to be identically and independently distributed. This has provided powerful justification for developing selection rules based on the conditional mean for genetic improvement in livestock populations, where candidates and data are neither identically nor independently distributed.
- Covariance theory. Since Ronald Fisher's landmark paper in 1918, covariance theory has played an important role in the analysis of genetic data. Fernando has contributed to extend this theory in several important directions for genetic evaluation and parameter estimation.
- Multi-breed populations: Fernando has contributed to developing theory for covariance between relatives in crossbred populations under additive and dominance gene action, providing the basis for genetic evaluation and parameter estimation in crossbred populations.
- Marker information: The usual theory for covariance between relatives provides results conditional on pedigree information and is the same for all loci. Fernando along with Mike Grossman provided theory to compute covariance between relatives conditional on pedigree and marker information to give locus specific results. They gave an efficient algorithm to invert the gametic covariance matrix. These results provide the basis for mapping QTL by the variance component approach and for marker-assisted BLUP (MAS-BLUP). This theory, which was originally derived for purebred populations, has been extended for crossbred populations, under additive and dominance gene action. Also, MAS-BLUP was extended to capture information from linkage disequilibrium and co-segregation (or linkage) between markers and QTL in multi-breed populations.
- Algorithms to compute genetic probabilities. Computing genotype, allele state, and allele origin probabilities are important for QTL mapping and MAS. For example, the variance component approach to map QTL requires computing the relationship matrix at the QTL conditional on marker information, and this matrix can be computed efficiently in terms of the conditional allele origin probabilities at the QTL given marker information. Fernando et al. developed a recursive algorithm to compute genotype probabilities for all members of a pedigree without loops, which also can be used to compute the likelihood of genetic models given pedigree data. This algorithm is currently used in SAGE, which is a package of computer programs widely used in human genetics. Iterative use of this algorithm in pedigrees with loops gives approximate results, and this is the basis for many computer programs for approximate probability computations with large complex pedigrees. He has also investigated other approximations. Recently, Fernando extended the Elston–Stewart algorithm to compute the exact likelihood and posterior probabilities with multi-locus models for pedigrees with loops. This algorithm was used to map the dwarf gene in Angus cattle. When pedigrees are very large and complex, the Elston-Stewart algorithm becomes computationally infeasible. Thus, he has also contributed to the development of Markov chain Monte Carlo (MCMC) algorithms for QTL mapping and MAS. These were shown to perform better than competing methods, including those in SOLAR and LOKI, which are widely used packages. These algorithms are currently used to compute haplotype and allele origin probabilities with several thousand pedigree members. These probabilities are needed in whole-genome analyses to combine linkage disequilibrium and linkage and to use low-density panels.
- Finite locus models and genomic selection. Fernando has investigated the use of finite locus models for parameter estimation and genetic evaluation. Currently, these methods are being adapted for genomic selection, which assumes a finite locus model. Recent contributions include studies on genomic selection of purebreds for crossbred performance and use of low-density panels to reduce genotyping costs, which is essential to make genomic selection cost effective in poultry and swine breeding. The GenSel software developed by Fernando and colleagues for whole-genome analyses is continually updated to incorporate findings of these and other studies, and it is used internationally.

== Honors and awards ==
Fernando was awarded the Horace W. Norton Award in 1985 for outstanding contributions to statistics, specifically his contribution in selection, non-mating, and the covariance theory by the University of Illinois.

In 2012, Fernando was awarded the Rockefeller Prentice Memorial Award in Animal Breeding and Genetics by the American Society of Animal Science.

== Personal life ==
Fernando was married in 1989 to Terry Harrigan, who obtained a PhD in biochemistry. The two met in Illinois and during their time together had four children.
