= Charles Roy Henderson bibliography =

List of works published by American statistician Charles Roy Henderson

The Charles Roy Henderson bibliography contains a list of works published by American statistician Charles Roy Henderson (1911–1989). His corpus covers his 40-year professional career from his PhD thesis in 1948 until his death in 1989. It includes three of his most important scientific publications: Estimation of Variance and Covariance Components (1953), The estimation of environmental and genetic trends from records subject to culling (1959, with Oscar Kempthorne, Shayle R. Searle, and C. M. von Krosigk), and A simple method for computing the inverse of a numerator relationship matrix used in prediction of breeding values (1976).

== Books ==
- Henderson, CR (1984). Applications of Linear Models in Animal Breeding. Guelph, Ont: University of Guelph. ISBN 978-0-88955-030-8.

=== Book chapters ===
- Henderson, CR (1990). "Statistical Methods in Animal Improvement: Historical Overview". In Gianola, Daniel; Hammond, Keith (eds.). Advances in Statistical Methods for Genetic Improvement of Livestock. Springer-Verlag Inc. pp. 2–14. ISBN 978-3-540-50809-0.
- Henderson, CR (1990). "Accounting for Selection and Mating Biases in Genetic Evaluation". In Gianola, Daniel; Hammond, Keith (eds.). Advances in Statistical Methods for Genetic Improvement of Livestock. Springer-Verlag Inc. pp. 413–436. ISBN 978-3-540-50809-0.
- Henderson, C.R. (1984). "ANOVA, MIVQUE, REML, and ML Algorithms for Estimation of Variances and Covariances". In David, H. A.; David, H. T. (eds.). Statistics: An Appraisal. Iowa State University. pp. 257–280. ISBN 978-0-8138-1721-7.

== Journal articles ==
=== 1980s ===
- Henderson, C. R. (1989). "Prediction of Merits of Potential Matings from Sire-Maternal Grandsire Models with Nonadditive Genetic Effects". Journal of Dairy Science. 72 (10): 2592–2605. doi:10.3168/jds.S0022-0302(89)79400-5.
- Henderson, CR (1988). "Use of an average numerator relationship matrix for multiple-sire joining". Journal of Animal Science. 66 (7): 1614–1621. doi:10.2527/jas1988.6671614x.
- Henderson, C. R. (1988). "The use of equivalent linear models in mixed model estimation and prediction". Communications in Statistics - Theory and Methods. 17 (4): 969–982. doi:10.1080/03610928808829668.
- Henderson, C. R. (1988). "Simple Method to Compute Biases and Mean Squared Errors of Linear Estimators and Predictors in a Selection Model Assuming Multivariate Normality". Journal of Dairy Science. 71 (11): 3135–3142. doi:10.3168/jds.S0022-0302(88)79914-2.
- Henderson, C. R. (1988). "Exact Prediction Error Variances for Full Model Computed from Reduced Model". Journal of Dairy Science. 71 (11): 3128–3134. doi:10.3168/jds.S0022-0302(88)79913-0.
- Henderson, C. R. (1988). "A Simple Method to Account for Selected Base Populations". Journal of Dairy Science. 71 (12): 3399–3404. doi:10.3168/jds.S0022-0302(88)79945-2.
- Sasaki, Yoshiyuki; Henderson, C. R. (1986). "Best Linear Unbiased Prediction with the Reduced Animal Model: An Application to Evaluation of Performance-Tested Males". Journal of Animal Science. 63 (5): 1384–1388. doi:10.2527/jas1986.6351384x. ISSN 0021-8812.
- Henderson, C. R. (1986). "Estimation of Variances in Animal Model and Reduced Animal Model for Single Traits and Single Records". Journal of Dairy Science. 69 (5): 1394–1402. doi:10.3168/jds.S0022-0302(86)80546-X.
- Henderson, C. R. (1986). "Estimation of Singular Covariance Matrices of Random Effects". Journal of Dairy Science. 69 (9): 2379–2385. doi:10.3168/jds.S0022-0302(86)80677-4.
- Henderson, CR (1986). "Recent Developments in Variance and Covariance Estimation". Journal of Animal Science. 63: 208–216. doi:10.2527/jas1986.631208x.
- Henderson, CR (1985). "Best linear unbiased prediction of nonadditive genetic merits in noninbred populations". Journal of Animal Science. 60: 111–117. doi:10.2527/jas1985.601111x.
- Henderson, C. R. (1985). "Equivalent Linear Models to Reduce Computations". Journal of Dairy Science. 68 (9): 2267–2277. doi:10.3168/jds.S0022-0302(85)81099-7.
- Henderson, C. R. (1985). "Best Linear Unbiased Prediction Using Relationship Matrices Derived from Selected Base Populations". Journal of Dairy Science. 68 (2): 443–448. doi:10.3168/jds.S0022-0302(85)80843-2.
- Henderson, CR (1985). "MIVQUE and REML Estimation of Additive and Nonadditive Genetic Variances". Journal of Animal Science. 61: 113–121. doi:10.2527/jas1985.611113x.
- Henderson, C. R. (1984). "Estimation of Variances and Covariances under Multiple Trait Models". Journal of Dairy Science. 67 (7): 1581–1589. doi:10.3168/jds.S0022-0302(84)81480-0.
- Henderson, CR (1980). "Comparison of Unbiased Estimators and Approximate Tests of Hypothesis in the Unbalanced Mixed Model with Unknown Variances". ASA Proceedings of the Statistical Computing Section. American Statistical Association. pp. 47–51.

=== 1970s ===
- Henderson, C. R. (1979). "Analysis of covariance in mixed models with unequal subclass numbers". Communications in Statistics - Theory and Methods. 8 (8): 751–787. doi:10.1080/03610927908827798.
- Henderson, CR (1978). "Simulation to examine distributions of estimators of variances and ratios of variances". Journal of Dairy Science. 61 (2): 267–273. doi:10.3168/jds.S0022-0302(78)83590-5.
- Henderson, CR; McAllister, AJ (1978). "The missing subclass problem in two way fixed models". Journal of Animal Science. 46 (4): 1125–1137. doi:10.2527/jas1978.4641125x.
- Henderson, C. R. (1978). "Variance-Covariance Matrix of Estimators of Variances in Unweighted Means ANOVA". Biometrics. 34 (3): 462–468. doi:10.2307/2530609. JSTOR 2530609.
- Henderson, CR (1977). "Best linear unbiased prediction of breeding values not in the model for records". Journal of Dairy Science. 60 (5): 783–787. doi:10.3168/jds.S0022-0302(77)83935-0.
- Henderson, C. R. (1977). "Prediction of the merits of single crosses". Theoretical and Applied Genetics. 49 (6): 273–282. doi:10.1007/BF00275133. PMID 24407416. S2CID 20208156.
- Henderson, CR (1976). "Inverse of a matrix of relationships due to sires and maternal grandsires in an inbred population". Journal of Dairy Science. 59 (9): 1585–1588. doi:10.3168/jds.S0022-0302(76)84409-8.
- Henderson, CR; Quaas, RL (1976). "Multiple trait evaluation using relatives' records". Journal of Animal Science. 43 (6): 1188–1197. doi:10.2527/jas1976.4361188x.
- Henderson, CR (1976). "Multiple trait sire evaluation using the relationship matrix". Journal of Dairy Science. 59 (4): 769–774. doi:10.3168/jds.S0022-0302(76)84274-9.
- Henderson, C. R. (1976). "A Simple Method for Computing the Inverse of a Numerator Relationship Matrix Used in Prediction of Breeding Values". Biometrics. 32 (1): 69–83. doi:10.2307/2529339. JSTOR 2529339.
- Henderson, CR (1975). "Comparison of alternative sire evaluation methods". Journal of Animal Science. 41 (3): 760–770. doi:10.2527/jas1975.413760x.
- Henderson, CR (1975). "Use of relationships among sires to increase accuracy of sire evaluation". Journal of Dairy Science. 58 (11): 1731–1738. doi:10.3168/jds.S0022-0302(75)84777-1.
- Henderson, CR (1975). "Rapid method for computing the inverse of a relationship matrix". Journal of Dairy Science. 58 (11): 1727–1730. doi:10.3168/jds.S0022-0302(75)84776-X.
- Henderson, CR (1975). "Use of all relatives in intraherd prediction of breeding values and producing abilities". Journal of Dairy Science. 58 (12): 1910–1916. doi:10.3168/jds.S0022-0302(75)84808-9.
- Henderson, CR (1975). "Inverse of a matrix of relationships due to sires and maternal grandsires". Journal of Dairy Science. 58 (12): 1917–1921. doi:10.3168/jds.S0022-0302(75)84809-0.
- Henderson, C. R. (1975). "Rapid Method for Computing the Inverse of a Relationship Matrix". Journal of Dairy Science. 58 (11): 1727–1730. doi:10.3168/jds.S0022-0302(75)84776-X.
- Henderson, C. R. (1975). "Best Linear Unbiased Estimation and Prediction under a Selection Model". Biometrics. 31 (2): 423–447. doi:10.2307/2529430. JSTOR 2529430. PMID 1174616.
- Henderson, C. R.; Searle, S. R.; Schaeffer, L. R. (1974). "The Invariance and Calculation of Method 2 for Estimating Variance Components". Biometrics. 30 (4): 583–588. doi:10.2307/2529223. JSTOR 2529223.
- Henderson, C. R. (1973). Sire Evaluation and Genetic Trends. Proceedings of the Animal Breeding and Genetics Symposium in Honour of Dr. J. L. Lush, held July 29, 1972 at Virginia Polytechnic Institute and State University. Journal of Animal Science. Vol. 1973. pp. 10–41. doi:10.1093/ansci/1973.Symposium.10.
- Lee, A. J; Henderson, C. R. (1971). "Effect of Cow Culling on Repeatability Estimates". Journal of Animal Science. 32 (2): 167–173. doi:10.2527/jas1971.322167x. ISSN 0021-8812.

=== 1960s ===
- Lee, AJ; Henderson, CR (1969). "Components in genetic variance in milk yield". J Dairy Sci. 52 (6): 780–9. doi:10.3168/jds.s0022-0302(69)86648-8. PMID 4907259.
- Cunningham, E. P.; Henderson, C. R. (1968). "An Iterative Procedure for Estimating Fixed Effects and Variance Components in Mixed Model Situations". Biometrics. 24 (1): 13–25. doi:10.2307/2528457. JSTOR 2528457. PMID 5642400.
- Cunningham, E. P.; Henderson, C. R. (1966). "Analytical Techniques for Incomplete Block Experiments". Biometrics. 22 (4): 829–842. doi:10.2307/2528077. JSTOR 2528077.
- Van Vleck, L. D.; Henderson, C.R. (1965). "Statistics in the Design and Analysis of Physiology Experiments". Journal of Animal Science. 24 (2): 559–67. doi:10.2527/jas1965.242559x. PMID 14324385.
- Cunningham, E. P.; Henderson, C. R. (1965). "Repeatability of Weaning Traits in Beef Cattle1". Journal of Animal Science. 24 (1): 188–191. doi:10.2527/jas1965.241188x. ISSN 0021-8812.
- Cunningham, E. P.; Henderson, C. R. (1965). "Estimation of Genetic and Phenotypic Parameters of Weaning Traits in Beef Cattle1". Journal of Animal Science. 24 (1): 182–187. doi:10.2527/jas1965.241182x. ISSN 0021-8812.
- Allaire, F. R.; Henderson, C. R. (1965). "Inbreeding Within an Artificially Bred Dairy Cattle Population". Journal of Dairy Science. 48 (10): 1366–1371. doi:10.3168/jds.S0022-0302(65)88465-X. PMID 5863527.
- Henderson, C. R. (1963). "Selection Index and Expected Genetic Advance". In Hanson, W.D.; Robinson, H.F. (eds.). Statistical Genetics and Plant Breeding. Washington, D.C.: National Academies Press. doi:10.17226/20264.
- VanVleck, L. D.; Henderson, C. R.; Carter, H. W. (1962). "Evaluation of Sires Available through Planned Mating". Journal of Animal Science. 21 (1): 30–32. doi:10.2527/jas1962.21130x. ISSN 0021-8812. S2CID 86233026.
- VanVleck, L. D.; Wadell, L. H.; Henderson, C. R. (1961). "Components of Variance Associated with Milk and Fat Records of Artificially Sired Holstein Daughters". Journal of Animal Science. 20 (4): 812–816. doi:10.2527/jas1961.204812x. ISSN 0021-8812. S2CID 82719432.
- Searle, S. R.; Henderson, C. R. (1961). "Computing Procedures for Estimating Components of Variance in the Two-Way Classification, Mixed Model". Biometrics. 17 (4): 607–616. doi:10.2307/2527859. JSTOR 2527859.
- Heidhues, T; Henderson, C. R. (1961). "Teaching Selection Principles with Herd Records Generated by an Electronic Computer". Journal of Animal Science. 20 (3): 659–664. doi:10.2527/jas1961.203659x. ISSN 0021-8812.
- VanVleck, L. D.; Searle, S. R.; Henderson, C. R. (1960). "The Number of Daughter-Dam Pairs Needed for Estimating Heritability". Journal of Animal Science. 19 (3): 916–920. doi:10.2527/jas1960.193916x. ISSN 0021-8812. S2CID 82532852.

=== 1950s ===
- Henderson, C. R.; Kempthorne, Oscar; Searle, S. R.; von Krosigk, C. M. (1959). "The Estimation of Environmental and Genetic Trends from Records Subject to Culling". Biometrics. 15 (2): 192–218. doi:10.2307/2527669.
- Blackwell, R. L.; Henderson, C. R. (1955). "Variation in Fleece Weight, Weaning Weight and Birth Weight of Sheep under Farm Conditions". Journal of Animal Science. 14 (3): 831–843. doi:10.1093/ansci/14.3.831. ISSN 0021-8812.
- Henderson, C. R. (1953). "Estimation of Variance and Covariance Components". Biometrics. 9 (2): 226–252. doi:10.2307/3001853. JSTOR 3001853.
- Henderson, C. R. (1950). "Estimation of genetic parameters". Biometrics. 6: 186–187.
- Henderson, C. R. (1950). "Estimation of genetic parameters". Ann. Math. Stat. 21: 309–310.

=== 1940s ===
- Henderson, Charles Roy (1949). "Estimation of changes in herd environment". J. Dairy Sci. 32 (8): 706.
- Henderson, Charles Roy (1948). Estimation of general, specific and maternal combining abilities in crosses among inbred lines of swine (PhD thesis). Iowa State University.
