= Lawrence Schaeffer =

American geneticist

Lawrence (Larry) Raymond Schaeffer (born 3 April 1947) is an American geneticist, and emeritus professor of animal breeding and genetics at the University of Guelph, Guelph, Ontario, Canada.

== Biography ==
Larry Schaeffer was born in Chicago, Illinois, US, and grew up in the state of Indiana. In 1965 he attended Purdue University in West Lafayette, Indiana where he studied animal sciences and graduated with a Bachelor of Science. In 1969 he moved to Cornell University, Ithaca, New York, where he studied Quantitative Genetics under Henderson and Van Vleck. By 1971 he received a Master of Science and in 1973 received his doctorate (PhD).

Schaeffer then moved to the University of Guelph in Guelph, Ontario. Here he joined the Centre for Genetic Improvement of Livestock (CGIL). On July 7, 2011, he was awarded emeritus status.

== Work ==
Since the mid-1970s, Schaeffer had aided livestock breeders in understanding new mathematical methods and solutions to apply within breeding evaluations. Over the last few years he has also encouraged breeders and breeding companies to include genomic information into their breeding evaluations. Schaeffer published his results extensively, allowing them to pass into the public domain.

Starting in 1975 Schaeffer developed new methodologies in the area of variance component estimation and breeding value estimation in farm animals. From 1975 through the 1980s, he further developed the "BLUP" methodology with the solution of large systems of equations incorporating all kinship relationships. After 1990 Schaeffer developed theoretical and practical implementations in the evaluation of individual control data (test day data) using larger computer capacities. By 1994 the ability to compare international breeding values was ensured through the Multiple Across Country Evaluation (MACE) Model. This international breeding value estimation was carried out in Sweden by Interbull (a permanent Sub-Committee of the International Committee For Animal Recording (ICAR)). In 2006 the inclusion of genomic information in the form of single-base polymorphisms (SNPs) in breeding value estimation became part of many breeding organizations. Schaeffer has produced more than 170 works in magazines and books as well as 387 journal articles.

Schaeffer's most recent work involved monitoring genetic evaluation systems for dairy and meat sheep. He also worked on an Atlantic Salmon project with Dr. Elizabeth Boulding (University of Guelph) that used genomics to evaluate Canadian fish for disease resistance.

== Honours and awards ==
- 1988: Lush Award from the American Dairy Science Association
- 2009: Hermann von Nathusius Medal of the German Society for Breeding Studies
- Member of the Scientific Advisory Board of Interbull in Sweden

== Selected publications ==
- Schaeffer, Lawrence Raymond (1971). Effects of days dry and days open on lactation production of Holstein dairy cattle. Ithaca, N. Y.: Cornell University.
- Schaeffer, LR (1973). Factors affecting the accuracy of variance component estimation. Ithaca, New York: Cornell University.
- Henderson, C. R.; Searle, S. R.; Schaeffer, L. R. (1974). "The Invariance and Calculation of Method 2 for Estimating Variance Components". Biometrics. 30 (4): 583–588. doi:10.2307/2529223. JSTOR 2529223.
- Schaeffer, L.R.; Minder, C.E.; McMillan, I.; Burnside, E.B. (October 1977). "Nonlinear techniques for predicting 305-day lactation production of Holsteins and Jerseys". Journal of Dairy Science. 60 (10): 1636–1644. doi:10.3168/jds.S0022-0302(77)84081-2.
- Schaeffer, L. R. (1991). "C. R. Henderson: Contributions to Predicting Genetic Merit". Journal of Dairy Science. 74 (11): 4052–4066. doi:10.3168/jds.S0022-0302(91)78601-3. PMID 1757643.
- Schaeffer, LR (August 2006). "Strategy for applying genome-wide selection in dairy cattle". Journal of Animal Breeding and Genetics. 123 (4): 218–223. doi:10.1111/j.1439-0388.2006.00595.x. PMID 16882088.
- Grosu, Horia; Editura, Academia Română.; Schaeffer, Larry; Oltenacu, Pascal A.; Norman, Duane; Powell, Rex Lynn; Kremer, Valentin; Banos, Georgios; Mrode, R. A.; Carvalheira, Julio; Jambrozik, Janusz; Drăgănescu, Corneliu; Lungu, Sorin (2013). History of Genetic Evaluation Methods in Dairy Cattle. ISBN 978-973-27-2347-0.
