= Hermann von Nathusius Medal =

- Awarded for: Those who have excelled in the area of animal breeding
- Sponsored by: German Society for Animal Breeding
- Country: Germany

The Hermann von Nathusius Medal was endowed in 1928 by the German Society for Animal Breeding (DGfZ) in memory of Hermann Engelhard von Nathusius, an important German breeder. It is awarded, usually annually, to those who have excelled in the area of animal breeding, or in the production branch. [1]

The DGFZ was founded in 1905 as a non-profit association which, according to its statutes, should serve society by promoting close cooperation between animal breeding and veterinary medicine, to bring benefit in the areas of animal breeding, animal husbandry, animal feedstuffs, reproduction and health of livestock.

== Honoured Persons ==
- 1932 – M. de Chapeaurouge
- 1932 – Gustav Frölich, Halle (1879–1940)
- 1932 – Johannes Hansen, Berlin (1863–1938)
- 1932 – Heinz Henseler, München (1885–1968)
- 1936 – Johannes Freiherr von Gumppenberg, Berlin (1891–1959)
- 1936 – Bernd Freiherr von Kanne, Berlin (1884–1967)
- 1936 – Carl Kronacher, Berlin (1871–1938)
- 1936 – Karl Kürschner (Ministerialrat), Berlin
- 1936 – Konrad Meyer, Berlin (1901–1973)
- 1936 – Jakob Peters, Königsberg (1873–1944)
- 1937 – Ulrich Duerst, Bern, Schweiz (1876–1950)
- 1937 – Adolf Köppe, Norden (1874–1956)
- 1944 – Wilhelm Zorn, Tschechnitz (1884–1968)
- 1947 – Hans Gutbrod (Tierarzt), Bayern (1877–1948)
- 1950 – Jonas Schmidt, Hohenheim (1885–1958)
- 1954 – André-Max Leroy, Paris, Frankreich (1892–1978)
- 1955 – Richard Götze, Hannover (1890–1955)
- 1955 – Wilhelm Niklas, München (1887–1957)
- 1957 – Telesforo Bonadonna, Mailand (1901–1987)
- 1957 – Ludwig Dürrwaechter (Ministerialdirektor), München (1897–1964)
- 1957 – John Hammond, Cambridge, England (1889–1964)
- 1960 – Jay Laurence Lush, Ames, Iowa, USA (1896–1982)
- 1962 – Carl Theodor Schneider, Hofschwicheldt (1902–1964)
- 1965 – Malcolm Robert Irwin, Madison, Wisconsin, USA (1897–1987)
- 1967 – Werner Kirsch (Tierzüchter), Hohenheim, (1901–1975)
- 1975 – Edwin Lauprecht, Göttingen (1897–1987)
- 1976 – Franz Gerauer (Senator), Hartham, Niederbayern (1900–1987)
- 1979 – Ivar Johansson, Djursholm, Schweden (1891–1988)
- 1981 – Charles Roy Henderson, Ithaca, USA (1911–1989)
- 1983 – Walther Baier, München (1903–2003)
- 1983 – Wolfgang von Scharfenberg, Wanfried (1914–2005)
- 1984 – Fritz Haring, Göttingen (1907–1990)
- 1985 – Heino Hartwig Messerschmidt, Gokels (1915–1990)
- 1986 – Harald Skjervold, As, Norwegen (1917–1995)
- 1987 – Dietrich Fewson, Hohenheim (1925–2004)
- 1988 – Hermann Bogner, Grub (1921–2012)
- 1988 – Joachim Hahn, Hannover (born 1924)
- 1989 – Joachim Hans Weniger, Berlin (born 1925)
- 1990 – Hans Moser, Süßen, Baden-Württemberg (1926–2008)
- 1991 – Horst Kräußlich, München (1926–2010)
- 1992 – Rudolf Waßmuth, Gießen (born 1928)
- 1993 – Hans Merkt, Hannover (1923–2001)
- 1994 – Hans Otto Gravert, Kronshagen (1928–2015)
- 1995 – Franz Pirchner, Innsbruck (born 1927)
- 1996 – Franz Schmitten, Bonn (1929–2011)
- 1997 – Diedrich Smidt, Neustadt-Mariensee (born 1931)
- 1998 – Georg Schönmuth, Berlin (born 1928)
- 1999 – Gottfried Averdunk, Grub (1934–2011)
- 2000 – Peter Glodek, Göttingen (born 1934)
- 2001 – Gerhard von Lengerken, Halle (born 1936)
- 2002 – Erhard Kallweit, Neustadt-Evensen (born 1936)
- 2003 – Hans-Jürgen Langholz, Upleward (born 1935)
- 2004 – Ernst Kalm, Kiel (born 1940)
- 2005 – Dietmar Flock, Cuxhaven (born 1934)
- 2006 – Leo Dempfle, Freising-Weihenstephan (born 1942)
- 2007 – Ernst Lindemann, Berlin (born 1936)
- 2008 – Franz Ellendorff, Neustadt-Mariensee (born 1941)
- 2009 – Lawrence Schaeffer, Guelph, Canada (born 1947)
- 2012 – Manfred Schwerin, Rostock (born 1950)
- 2013 – Eildert Groeneveld, Neustadt-Mariensee (born 1948)
- 2014 – Georg Erhardt, Gießen (born 1950)
- 2015 - Ernst Pfeffer, Bonn (1939-2017)
- 2016 - Rudolf Preisinger, Cuxhaven (born 1957)
