= Daniel Gianola =

American geneticist

Professor Daniel Gianola
- Born: 1947 (age 78–79); Montevideo, Uruguay
- Education: Universidad de la Republica (Ing. Agr.); University of Wisconsin–Madison (MS, Ph.D)
- Spouse: Graciela Margall
- Scientific career
- Fields: Genetics; Statistics; Animal breeding; Plant breeding
- Workplaces: University of Wisconsin–Madison
- Doctoral advisor: Arthur B. Chapman
- Website: www.ansci.wisc.edu/Facultypages/gianola.html

Daniel Gianola (born 1947) is a geneticist based at the University of Wisconsin-Madison (US), reputed for his contributions in quantitative genetics to the fields of animal and plant breeding. In the early 1980s, Gianola extended best linear unbiased prediction to the non-linear domain for analysis of categorical traits (fertility, survival, resistance to diseases), using the classical threshold model of Sewall Wright. Subsequently, he pioneered the use of Bayesian methodologies and Monte Carlo Markov chain methods in quantitative genetics. He also revived early work by Sewall Wright on structural equation models and cast their application in the context of modern quantitative genetics and statistical methodology. His group in Wisconsin was the first in the world applying non-parametric methods, such as reproducing Kernel Hilbert spaces regression and Bayesian neural networks, to genome-enabled selection in animal breeding, agriculture and whole-genome (i.e., using a massive number of DNA markers) prediction of complex traits or diseases. Gianola published extensively on thresholds models, Bayesian theory, prediction of complex traits using mixed model methodology, hierarchical Bayesian regression procedures and machine learning techniques. Gianola has been also involved in whole-genome prediction of skin and bladder cancer in humans. He has taught extensively in more than twenty countries including recurrent visiting professorships at the Universidad Politecnica de Valencia (Spain), the Norwegian University of Life Sciences (Norway), Aarhus University (Denmark), Georg-August University (Germany) and the Technical University of Munich (Germany). He has been an Honorary Researcher at the Pasteur Institut de Montevideo since 2016. In an Editorial contained in a volume published in Gianola's honor in the Journal of Animal Breeding and Genetics (2017), it was stated that "He is probably the one lecturer in animal breeding and genetics, who has the biggest impact on the largest number of followers in the numerous classes and courses he has taught with never-ending energy all across the world."

== Education ==
Gianola studied agricultural engineering (Ing. Agr.) at the Universidad de la Republica where he graduated in 1970. He received the MS (1973) and Ph.D. (1975) degrees from the University of Wisconsin–Madison.

== Biography ==
Gianola was born in Montevideo on 16 May 1947. His father, Gorgias Gianola, was an MIT graduate in mechanical engineering as well as a musician; his mother, Alondra Barberia (known as Alondra Alzua), was a producer of television and radio programs in Uruguay. Gianola spent long periods at the family farm in Melo, Uruguay, and his grandfather (Antonio Gianola, the first livestock auctioneer in Uruguay) was influential in his choice of agricultural science as a career. After graduating in agricultural engineering from Universidad de la Republica at 23 years of age, Gianola moved to the USA to pursue postgraduate studies (MS and Ph.D degrees at the University of Wisconsin-Madison in 1973 and 1975, working with Professors W. J. Tyler and A. B. Chapman, respectively). He also studied for one year at Cornell University, where he was taught by Professors Charles Henderson, L. D. Van Vleck and Shayle R. Searle. In 1975-1977 he worked for the World Bank as a population and livestock specialist. From 1978 to 1991 he worked as assistant professor, associate professor (1981) and professor (1987) in the department of animal sciences at the University of Illinois at Urbana-Champaign. Gianola became professor (1991) in the department of animal sciences and department of dairy science at the University of Wisconsin-Madison where he is now Sewall Wright Emeritus Professor of Animal Breeding and Genetics. He was also affiliated with the department of biostatistics and medical informatics at the University of Wisconsin-Madison. Daniel Gianola is married with the Uruguayan lawyer Graciela Margall and has two children (Magdalena and Daniel Santiago).

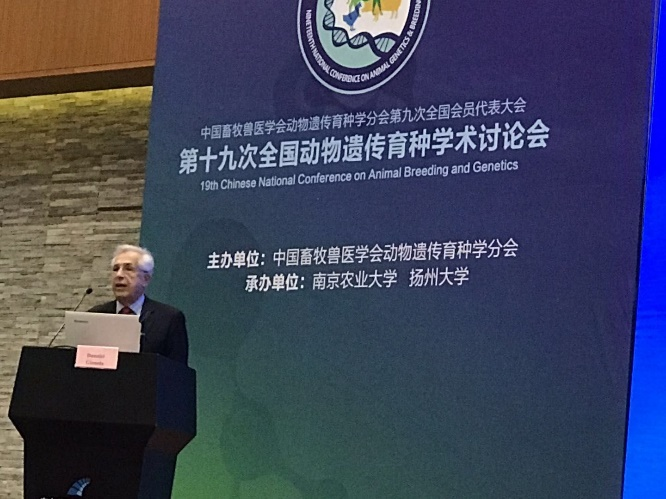
Daniel Gianola delivering a conference in Nanjing, China, 2017

== Significant publications ==
- Sorensen, D.; Gianola, D. (2007). Likelihood, Bayesian and MCMC methods in quantitative genetics. New York: Springer-Verlag. ISBN 9780387227641. OCLC 53165152.
- Gianola, D.; Hammond, K. (1990). Advances in Statistical Methods for Genetic Improvement of Livestock. Berlin: Springer-Verlag. ISBN 9783642744877. OCLC 840295295.
- Gianola, D. (1982). "Theory and Analysis of Threshold Characters". Journal of Animal Science. 54 (5): 1079–1096. doi:10.2527/jas1982.5451079x.
- Gianola, D.; Foulley, J. L. (1983). "Sire evaluation for ordered categorical data with a threshold model". Génétique, Sélection, Évolution. 15 (2): 201–224. doi:10.1186/1297-9686-15-2-201. ISSN 1297-9686. PMC 2714596. PMID 22879123.
- Gianola, D.; Fernando, R. L. (1986). "Bayesian Methods in Animal Breeding Theory". Journal of Animal Science. 63: 217–244. doi:10.2527/jas1986.631217x.
- Sorensen, D. A.; Andersen, S.; Gianola, D.; Korsgaard, I. (1995). "Bayesian inference in threshold models using Gibbs sampling". Genetics Selection Evolution. 27 (3): 229–249. doi:10.1186/1297-9686-27-3-229. ISSN 1297-9686. PMC 2708245.
- Gianola, D.; Kaam, J. B. C. H. M. (2008). "Reproducing Kernel Hilbert Spaces Regression Methods for Genomic Assisted Prediction of Quantitative Traits". Genetics. 178 (4): 2289–2303. doi:10.1534/genetics.107.084285. ISSN 0016-6731. PMC 2323816. PMID 18430950.
- de los Campos, G.; Naya, H.; Gianola, D.; Crossa, J.; Legarra, A.; Manfredi, E.; Weigel, K.; Cotes, J. M. (2009). "Predicting Quantitative Traits With Regression Models for Dense Molecular Markers and Pedigree". Genetics. 182 (1): 375–385. doi:10.1534/genetics.109.101501. ISSN 0016-6731. PMC 2674834. PMID 19293140.
- Gianola, D.; de los Campos, G.; Hill, W. G.; Manfredi, E.; Fernando, R. L. (2009). "Additive Genetic Variability and the Bayesian Alphabet". Genetics. 183 (1): 347–363. doi:10.1534/genetics.109.103952. ISSN 0016-6731. PMC 2746159. PMID 19620397.
- Gianola, D.; Rosa, G.J. (2015). "One hundred years of statistical developments in animal breeding". Annu Rev Anim Biosci. 3: 19–56. doi:10.1146/annurev-animal-022114-110733. PMID 25387231.

== Honours, decorations, awards and distinctions ==
- 2017 Honorable Professor, Hunan Agricultural University, China.
- 2017 Mercator Visiting Professor, Technical University of Munich, Germany.
- 2015 Hilldale Award in the Biological Sciences, University of Wisconsin-Madison.
- 2014 Elected member of the Accademia dei Georgofili, Florence, Italy.
- 2013 Elected member of the Académie d’Agriculture de France, Paris, France
- 2012 Dr. Sc. Honoris Causa, Iowa State University, USA
- 2011 Hans Fischer Senior Fellow Award, Technical University of Munich, Germany
- 2010 Dr. Sc. Honoris Causa, Universidad de la Republica, Montevideo, Uruguay
- 2010 Dr. Sc. Honoris Causa, University of Aarhus, Denmark
- 2009 Dr. Sc. Honoris Causa, Facultad de Agronomía, Montevideo, Uruguay
- 2009 Dr. Sc. Honoris Causa, University of Göttingen, Germany
- 2007 Alexander Von Humboldt Senior Research Award, Alexander von Humboldt Foundation, Bonn, Germany
- 2007 Chaire D’Excellence Pierre de Fermat, Region Midi-Pyrenees, Toulouse, France
- 2007 Sewall Wright Professor of Animal Breeding and Genetics, University of Wisconsin-Madison
- 2006 Mercator Visiting Professor (German Research Foundation) at the University of Göttingen, Germany
- 2002 Dr. Sc. Honoris Causa, Universidad Politécnica de Valencia, Spain.
- 1995 Fellow, American Statistical Association, U.S.A.
- 1989 Rockefeller Prentice Memorial Award for Outstanding Contributions to Animal Breeding and Genetics Research, American Society of Animal Science, U.S.A.
- 1989 J. L. Lush Award for Outstanding Research in Animal Breeding, American Dairy Science Association, U.S.A.
- 1987 University Scholar, University of Illinois, USA. “Recognition of the very best of faculty scholarship at the University of Illinois”.
- 1987 Outstanding Young Researcher, American Society of Animal Science, Midwestern Section, U.S.A.
- 1983 H. H. Mitchell Award for Excellence in Graduate Teaching and Research, Department of Animal Science, University of Illinois, U.S.A.
