= Malcolm Robert Irwin =

American geneticist

Malcolm Robert Irwin (2 March 1897, Artesian, South Dakota – 12 October 1987, Madison, Wisconsin) was an American agronomist and pioneering immunogeneticist.

== Education and career ==
He received his bachelor's degree in agriculture in 1920 from Iowa State College, later renamed Iowa State University. From 1921 to 1924 he was a teacher at the American Farm School in Thessaloniki (Greece). Irvin then began graduate study under Ernest W. Lindström (1891–1948) at the recently established department of genetics of Iowa State University and received his Ph.D. there in 1928.

With the support of a National Research Council Fellowship, he studied from 1928 to 1929 with William E. Castle at the Bussey Institution of Harvard University and from 1929 to 1930 with Leslie Tillotson Webster at the Rockefeller Institute for Medical Research. At the Rockefeller Institute he was influenced by the immunohematologist Karl Landsteiner and by the immunochemists Oswald Avery and Michael Heidelberger. Irwin became in 1930 an assistant professor of genetics at the University of Wisconsin-Madison, where the only two other faculty members of the genetics department were L. J. Cole and R. A. Brink. There Irwin was from 1936 to 1939 an associate professor and from 1939 to 1965 a full professor of genetics. From 1951 to 1965 he was also the chair of the genetics department, building powerful expertise in immunogenetics and founding a "school" of blood group scientists. He recruited, among others, Sewall Wright and Joshua Lederberg.

Starting in 1930, Irwin and his coworkers developed reliable and standardizable kits for blood group test sera to characterize the cellular antigens of the red blood cells in cattle, sheep, and pigs. By means of blood group analysis, controversial cases of descent could now be clarified. Irwin also investigated the immunological processes after tissue transplantation, as well as cellular antibody production. These results have been of tremendous benefit to human medicine.

== Awards and honors ==
- 1938 — Daniel Giraud Elliot Medal of the American Academy of Sciences
- 1950 — election to membership in the United States National Academy of Sciences
- 1962 — Morrison Award from the American Society of Animal Science
- 1965 — Hermann von Nathusius Medal of the Deutsche Gesellschaft für Züchtungskunde (German Society for Animal Breeding); awarded "In recognition of his groundbreaking work in the field of immunogenetics and the study of blood types in domesticated animals"

== Selected publications ==
- The inheritance of resistance to the Danysz bacillus in the rat. Genetics. 14(4):337–365. 1929
- Dissimilarities between antigenic properties of red blood cells of dove hybrid and parental genera. Proc. Soc. Exp. Biol. Med. 29:850–851. 1932
- with B. A. Beach and F. N. Bell: Studies on the bactericidal action of bovine whole blood and serum towards Brucella abortus and Brucella suis. J. Infect. Dis. 58:15-22. 1936 JSTOR 30089035
- Immuno-genetic studies of species relationships in columbidae. J. Gen. 35(3):351–373. 1938 doi:10.1007/BF02982360
- A genetic analysis of species differences in Columbidae. Genetics 24(5):709–721. 1939
- with W. E. Briles and W. H. McGibbon: On multiple alleles effecting cellular antigens in the chicken. Genetics 35(6):633–652. 1950
- with Clyde Stormont and R. D. Owen: The B and C systems of bovine blood groups. Genetics 36(2):134–161. 1951
