= Giovanni Bittante =

Italian animal scientist (born 1953)

Giovanni Bittante (born 28 February 1953) is an animal scientist at the University of Padua, Italy. Reputed for his contributions to the field of animal breeding and genetics, ecological footprint, and quality of animal foods in Europe and worldwide.

== Biography ==
Giovanni Bittante was born in Cassola, Vicenza, northeast Italy, on 28 February 1953. He grew up in a family with an agricultural background. In 1976 he graduated in Agricultural Sciences at the Faculty of Agriculture of the University of Padua with laude.

He married Emanuela Zerbato in 1985, and had two daughters, Giulia and Chiara, and a son, Alberto.

== Early career (1977-1989) ==
At 24 years of age, he became an assistant professor, and three years later a senior assistant professor of General Zootechnics at the University of Padua, and at 29 years, he started working as an associate professor in genetic improvement of farm animals at the same university.

His initial research, working under the supervision of prof. Mario Bonsembiante, was dedicated to beef production (nutrients requirements of fattening young bulls, their metabolism, effects of feeding regimes and nutritive evaluation of feeds) and heifers and suckler cows (effects of beta-carotene on fertility, valorization of crop wastes and residues and of grass silages). He then progressively oriented his scientific interest toward quantitative genetics of beef traits (progeny testing and performance testing of beef and dual-purpose cattle breeds), crossbreeding schemes (in cattle and pigs), and valorization of farm animal biodiversity (autochthonous cattle and sheep breeds).

At 33 years, he was appointed as full professor of animal husbandry at the Faculty of Agriculture of the University of Reggio Calabria, and the following year was elected director of the Institute of Zootechnics of the same university.

== Twenty years dedicated to academic responsibilities (1989-2009) ==
At 36 years, he returned to Padua University as a full professor of General Zootechnics and Animal Genetic Improvement. Two years later he was elected director (1991–96) of the new Department of Zootechnical Sciences of the same university, and after one year he became also the dean of the new Faculty of Veterinary Medicine of Padua (1992-1995). In those years he was involved in the creation of the new scientific and technological park of Agripolis in the Campus of Legnaro of the University of Padua, where both the department and the faculty were moved. After having been a visiting professor at the Department of Animal Science, Animal Breeding and Genetics group at Michigan State University (USA), at 46 years he was elected dean of the Faculty of Agricultural Sciences (1999-2005) and later director of the Department of Animal Sciences (2005 to 2009).

His research activity continued in the fields of valorization of autochthonous breeds and of genetic improvement of beef breeds, but he developed also new research on dairy cattle, and especially on quality and technological traits of milk (fatty acid profile, genetic variants of milk protein fractions, coagulation, curd firming and cheese-making properties, also developing infrared spectroscopy predictions) and on cows’ welfare (udder health, fertility and body condition).

== Recent activity (2010-2023) ==
In recent periods Giovanni Bittante dedicated almost exclusively to teaching and research at the University of Padua, campus of Agripolis. He was the founder and president of an interdisciplinary bachelor course on science and culture of gastronomy, where he taught “Foods and environment”, while teaching “Animals, Economy and Society” for the master course in animal science and technology. He was also a professor of the PhD course in “Animal and Food Science”, being the supervisor of more than 20 PhD students from different continents.

The research activity, beyond continuing to develop the previous issues on beef quality (fatty acid profile, mineral profile, quality traits prediction at slaughtering using portable NIR devices, volatile organic compounds of meat) and beef production (selection for increasing calving ease, genomic selection of beef traits, sexed semen for improving beef production from dairy herds), and on dairy populations (genome-wide association studies and selection on cheese-making properties and cheese sensory traits), was extended to other dairy species (buffalo, sheep, goat, dromedary camel, and donkey) and to human milk. The infrared spectrometry was also applied to new food traits (fatty acids, minerals, milk protein fractions, etc.) and to traits related to animal well-being and fertility and to methane excretions.

Large efforts were lastly dedicated by Giovanni Bittante to the research on the environmental impact of animal production (effects of the prediction method, farm and animal productivity, breed, selection and crossbreeding on cows’ enteric methane excretion; nitrogen excretion in different species and effects of low protein diets) and to the ecological footprint of different farming systems, with special attention to life cycle assessment (LCA) of summer highland transhumance and intensive indoor farming. At 70 years, Giovanni Bittante retired from the University of Padua.

== Scientific publications ==
Bittante is author of 5 technical books and of about 500 scientific publications with more than 9,500 citations and an H-Index of 51.

== Cultural activities ==
Giovanni Bittante is a member of several Italian cultural academies:

- Emeritus member of the Accademia dei Georgofili, established in 1753 in Florence.
- Member of the Istituto Veneto di Scienze, Lettere ed Arti, established in 1810 in Venice.
- Member of Accademia Olimpica, established in 1585 at the Palladium's Teatro Olimpico of Vicenza.
- Member of the Accademia Galileiana, established in 1599 in Padua.

== Recent honors ==
- 2020 won, first Italian researcher, the Leroy Award assigned by the European Federation of Animal Science (EAAP);
- 2020 was admitted, first Italian researcher, to the Journal of Dairy Science Club 100 of the American Dairy Science Association (ADSA);
- 2009-2013 was Coordinator of the FAO Italian National Focal Point for Farm animal Biodiversity and member of the European Regional Focal Point for Animal Genetic Resources (ERFP);
- 2009-2013 was Member of the National Council for Agriculture and Nutrition of the Italian Ministry of Agriculture;
- 2007-2010 was Member of the "Council" of the European Federation of Animal Science (EAAP).
