= Rohan Fernando =

Rohan Fernando may refer to:

- Rohan Fernando (artist), Canadian artist, painter and filmmaker
- Rohan Fernando (geneticist), Sri Lankan American geneticist
