= British Society of Animal Science =

Learned society

British Society of Animal Science (BSAS) is a learned society in the field of animal science, established in 1944 as the British Society of Animal Production.

Maggie Mitchell is Chief Executive of the British Society of Animal Science. Elizabeth Magowan was appointed president in March 2023.

== Publications ==
The first Proceedings was published in 1951.ISSN 0369-8521 The editors soon started accepting papers on animal production.

In 1959 the society established a dedicated journal, Animal Production, for this purpose. It was published in three issues per year in 1961, and four issues per year in 1971.

In 1995, the society was renamed, and the journal retitled to Animal Science.

A partnership with Institut National de la Recherche Agronomique (INRA) and European Federation for Animal Science publish the journal Animal: An International Journal of Animal Bioscience. The journal is a merge of three journals including the BSAS journal Animal Science, which was published six times a year.

== Sir John Hammond Award ==
The society presents the Sir John Hammond Award at the annual conference. Recipients include:

- 2023: Sharon Huws
- 2022: Phil Garnsworthy
- 2021: Judith Capper BSc, PhD
- 2020: Not awarded
- 2019: Kevin J Shingfield B.Sc, PhD (posthumous award)
- 2018: David Kenny B Agr.Sc, PhD
- 2017: Elizabeth Magowan B.Sc., B Agr., PhD
- 2016: John O’Doherty B.Agr.Sc (Hons), M.Agr.Sc, PhD, DSc
- 2015: Michael R F Lee BSc (Hons), PhD, RAnimalSci, PGCTHE
- 2014: Eileen Wall BAgrSc, MAgrSc, PhD
- 2013: Donagh Berry BAgrSc, MSc, PhD
- 2012: Timothy W J Keady BAgrSc, PhD, DipComm
- 2011: Liam A Sinclair BSc, PhD
- 2010: Melissa D Royal, BSc, PhD
- 2009: Steve Bishop, Roslin Institute, Edinburgh
- 2008: Richard Dewhurst, Teagasc, Ireland
- 2007: Nigel Scollan, IGER, UK
- 2006: Alistair Carson, ARINI, Northern Ireland
- 2005: Kevin Sinclair, University of Nottingham
- 2004: John Woolliams, Roslin Institute, Edinburgh
- 2003: Iain Wright, Macauley, Aberdeen
- 2002: Ilias Kyriazakis, SAC Edinburgh
- 2001: Christopher Haley, Roslin Institute
- 2000: Christoper K Reynolds, University of Reading
- 1999:
- 1998: Ian Wilmut, Roslin Institute, Edinburgh
- 1997: Geoff Simm, SAC, Edinburgh
- 1996: Sinclair Mayne, ARINI, Northern Ireland
- 1995: Janice I Harland, British Sugar
- 1994: Cled Thomas, SAC Auchincruive
- 1993: Will Haresign, University of Nottingham
- 1992: Margaret Gill, NRI
- 1991: Jeff D Wood, University of Bristol
- 1990: John D Oldham, SAC Edinburgh
- 1989: A John Webb, Cotswold Pig Development Company
- 1988: Anthony J Kempster, MLC, Milton Keynes
- 1987: E Robert Orskov, Rowett Research Inst
- 1986: A John F Webster, University of Bristol
- 1985:
- 1984: John J Robinson, Rowett Research Institute, Aberdeen
- 1983: Colin T Whittemore, University of Edinburgh
- 1982: R B Land
- 1981: J Hodgson
- 1980: J B Owen
- 1979: P J Broadbent
- 1978: W H Broster & I McDonald
- 1977: G E Lamming
- 1976: T R Preston
- 1975:
- 1974:
- 1973: F W H Elsley
- 1972:
- 1971: E J C Polge
- 1970: St C S Taylor
- 1969:
- 1968: D G Armstrong
