= Uterine contraction =

Contraction of the uterus

Uterine contractions are muscle contractions of the uterine smooth muscle that can occur at various intensities in both the non-pregnant and pregnant uterine state. The non-pregnant uterus undergoes small, spontaneous contractions in addition to stronger, coordinated contractions during the menstrual cycle and orgasm.

Throughout gestation, the uterus enters a state of uterine quiescence due to various neural and hormonal changes. During this state, the uterus undergoes little to no contractions, though spontaneous contractions still occur for the uterine myocyte cells to experience hypertrophy. The pregnant uterus only contracts strongly during orgasms, labour, and in the postpartum stage to return to its natural size.

== Throughout menstrual cycle ==
Uterine contractions that occur throughout the menstrual cycle, also termed endometrial waves or contractile waves, appear to involve only the sub-endometrial layer of the myometrium.

=== Follicular and luteal phase ===
In the early follicular phase, uterine contractions in the non-pregnant woman occur 1–2 times per minute and last 10–15 seconds with a low intensity of usually 30 mmHg or less. This sub-endometrial layer is rich in estrogen and progesterone receptors. The frequency of contractions increases to 3–4 per minute towards ovulation. During the luteal phase, the frequency and intensity decrease, possibly to facilitate any implantation.

=== Menstruation ===
If implantation does not occur, the frequency of contractions remains low; but at menstruation the intensity increases dramatically to between 50 and 200 mmHg producing labor-like contractions. These contractions are sometimes termed menstrual cramps, although that term is also used for menstrual pain in general. These contractions may be uncomfortable or even painful, but they are generally significantly less painful than contractions during labour. Painful contractions are called dysmenorrhea.

=== Directionality of contractions ===
A shift in the myosin expression of the uterine smooth muscle has been hypothesized as arising for changes in the directions of uterine contractions during the menstrual cycle.

== Labour and pregnancy ==
Uterine contractions are a vital part of natural childbirth, which occur during the process of labour and delivery, (typically this excludes caesarean section). These labour contractions are characterized by their rhythmic tightening and relaxation of the myometrium, the most prominent uterine muscle. Labour contractions primarily serve the purpose of opening and dilating the cervix, which leads to the assisting of the passage of the baby through the vaginal canal during the first stage of labour.

Throughout pregnancy, the uterus experiences motor denervation, thus inhibiting spontaneous contractions. The remaining contractions are predominantly hormonally controlled. The decrease in the coordination of uterine smooth muscles cells reduces the effectiveness of contractions, causing the uterus to enter a state of uterine quiescence. During the beginning of labour, contractions may initially be intermittent and irregular, but will transition into a more coordinated pattern as the labour progresses. This transition is governed by various myogenic, neurogenic, and hormonal factors working together. As labour progresses, contractions will typically increase in frequency and intensity, which leads to a significant rise in intrauterine pressure.

Otherwise, not all contractions experienced by pregnant individuals are indications of the beginning of labour. Some women experience what are commonly called Braxton Hicks contractions before their initial due date, which are characterized as “false labour." Though similar to labour uterine contractions, these contractions do not play a prominent role in cervical dilation or the progression of childbirth.

=== Oxytocin ===
The hormone oxytocin has been identified as inducing uterine contractions, and labour in general. Oxytocin is produced by the body naturally and since the 1950s has also been available in synthetic pharmaceutical form. In either form, oxytocin stimulates uterine contractions to accelerate the process of childbirth. Production and secretion of oxytocin is controlled by a positive feedback mechanism, where its initial release, either naturally or in pharmaceutical form, stimulates production and release of further oxytocin. For example, when oxytocin is released during a contraction of the uterus at the start of childbirth, this stimulates production and release of more oxytocin and an increase in the duration, intensity and frequency of contractions. This process compounds in intensity and frequency and continues until the triggering activity ceases.

=== Prostaglandins ===
The concentration of prostaglandins in the blood plasma and amniotic fluid increases during labor. These inflammatory mediators encourage myometrial contractions to induce labor. Prostaglandins are also related to the changes in gap junction formation and connexin-43 expression during labor.

== In orgasm ==
Uterine and vaginal contractions usually take place during female sexual stimulation, including sexual arousal, and orgasm.

== Monitors ==
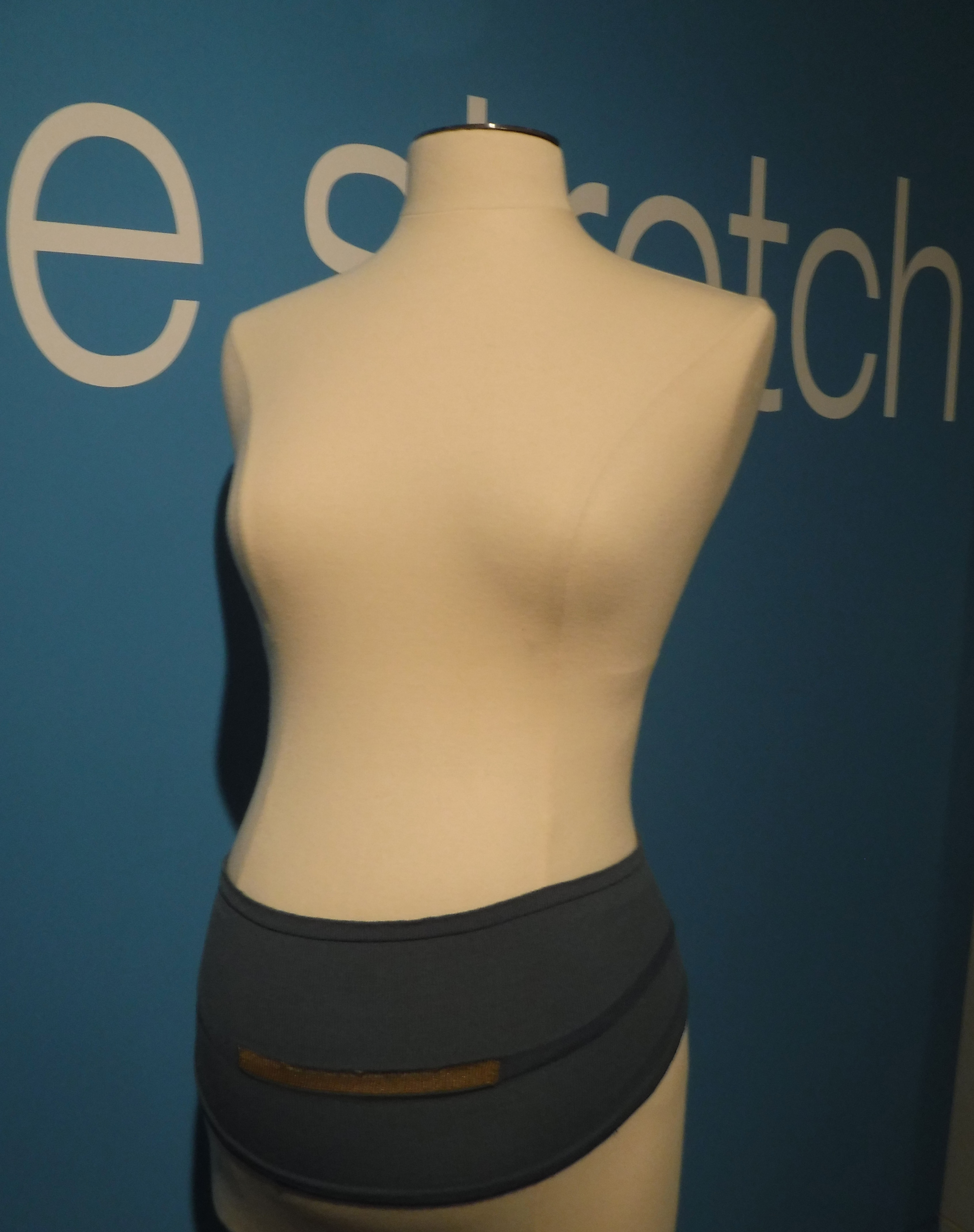
Knitted Bellyband with conductive thread and RFID chip to monitor contractions

Uterine contractions can be monitored by cardiotocography, in which a device is affixed to the skin of the mother or directly to the fetal scalp. The pressure required to flatten a section of the uterine wall correlates with the internal pressure, thereby providing an estimate of it.

A type of monitoring technology under development at Drexel University embeds conductive threads in the knitted fabric of a bellyband. When the fibers stretch in response to a contraction, the threads function like an antenna, and send the signals they pick up to an embedded RFID (radio-frequency identification device) chip that reports the data.

== Mechanism ==
=== Resting state ===
The resting membrane potential (V_{rest}) of uterine smooth muscle has been recorded to be between −35 and −80 mV. As with the resting membrane potential of other cell types, it is maintained by a Na^{+}/K^{+} pump that causes a higher concentration of Na^{+} ions in the extracellular space than in the intracellular space, and a higher concentration of K^{+} ions in the intracellular space than in the extracellular space. Subsequently, having K^{+} channels open to a higher degree than Na^{+} channels results in an overall efflux of positive ions, resulting in a negative potential.

This resting potential undergoes rhythmic oscillations, which have been termed slow waves, and reflect intrinsic activity of slow wave potentials. These slow waves are caused by changes in the distribution of Ca^{2+}, Na^{+}, K^{+} and Cl^{−} ions between the intracellular and extracellular spaces, which, in turn, reflects the permeability of the plasma membrane to each of those ions. K^{+} is the major ion responsible for such changes in ion flux, reflecting changes in various K^{+} channels.

=== Excitation-contraction ===
As the uterus becomes essentially denervated during gestation, it is unlikely that any coordinated nervous regulation of the myometrium is centrally orchestrated.

==== Excitation ====
The excitation-contraction coupling of the uterine smooth muscle is also very similar to that of other smooth muscles in general, with intracellular increase in calcium (Ca^{2+}) leading to contraction.

Nitric oxide (NO) is particularly effective in relaxing the myometrium and in fact has a lower inhibitory concentration 50% (Ki) in human than guinea pig or non-human primate myometrium.

=== Restoration to resting state ===
Uterine smooth muscle mechanisms of relaxation differ significantly from those of other human smooth muscles. Removal of Ca^{2+} after contraction induces relaxation of the smooth muscle, and restores the molecular structure of the sarcoplasmic reticulum for the next contractile stimulus.

== Measuring uterine contractility ex vivo ==
Ethically donated human uterine tissues can be used to measure uterine contractility ex vivo. In these experiments, sections of myometrium are set up in an organ bath system that to measure changes in isometric force production. Following functional checks to ensure the tissue is physiologically active, compounds can be added to the organ bath in increasing concentrations to create a cumulative concentration-response curve (CCRC).

A key advantage of measuring uterine contractility ex vivo is the ability to eliminate species differences. For example, while magnesium reduces myometrial contractility in animal studies and in vitro, it does not demonstrate the same effect in clinical studies. And while the peptide hormone relaxin has been shown to inhibit uterine contractility in rats, mice, and pigs, it does not prevent uterine contractility in humans.

== See also ==
- Involution (medicine)
