= Animal Reproduction Science =

- Discipline: Animal science
- Language: English
- Edited by: J.E. Kinder

Publication details
- History: 1977–present
- Publisher: Elsevier
- Frequency: Monthly
- Open access: Hybrid
- License: CC BY 4.0 or CC BY-NC-ND 4.0
- Impact factor: 1.660 (2019)

Standard abbreviations
- ISO 4: Anim. Reprod. Sci.

Indexing
- ISSN: 0378-4320

Links
- Journal homepage; Online archive

Animal Reproduction Science is a monthly peer-reviewed journal that publishes original research and reviews on topics relating to reproduction and fertility in animals. The journal was established in 1977 and is published by Elsevier. The editor-in-chief is J.E. Kinder. The journal is abstracted and indexed in the Science Citation Index Expanded, Scopus, AGRICOLA, BIOSIS Previews, EMBASE, MEDLINE, and Academic Search Premier. According to the Journal Citation Reports, the journal has a 2019 impact factor of 1.660.
