= Monkey breeding =

Monkey breeding is the practice of mating monkeys in captivity with the intent to maintain or produce young. Monkeys reproduce without human interference, so their offsprings' characteristics are determined by natural selection. Captive bred monkeys may be intentionally bred by their owners. A person who intentionally mates monkeys to produce babies is referred to as a monkey breeder.

Breeding outside of zoos is typically done for commercial gain.

== History ==
Monkeys have been bred in captivity for hundreds of years. Initially used for circus and street performance, their trainers would breed stock to maintain the correct temperament.

Breeding also occurred in European zoos from the 18th century when monkeys were returned from sea voyages and the public took interest in them.

Recently large scale commercial breeders have been established. They are typically located in the United States where is there is a growing demand for monkey pets. The cost of breeding is quite high and thus only selected breeders do it in volume.

== Types of monkeys that can breed ==
Not all species are suited for breeding in captivity. The following is a list known to reproduce well in zoos and in private breeder facilities.

- Rhesus
- Pigtails
- Java
- Snow macaque
- Guenons
- Patas
- Spiders
- Capuchins
- Squirrels
- Marmosets
- Baboons
- Chimps

== See also ==
- Animal breeding
- Animal sexual behaviour
- Monkey
