= American Registry of Professional Animal Scientists =

The American Registry of Professional Animal Scientists (ARPAS) is a professional organization that provides certification of animal scientists through examination. It also develops and promotes a code of ethics, offers continuing education, and disseminates scientific information through publication of the peer-reviewed journal Applied Animal Science

ARPAS members are generally animal scientists educated at land-grant universities throughout the United States. Professional animal scientists serve as consultants, researchers, educators, extension agents and regulators in jobs relating to the animal industry.

ARPAS is affiliated with five professional societies: the American Dairy Science Association (ADSA), the American Meat Science Association (AMA), the American Society of Animal Science (ASAS), the Equine Science Society (ESS) and the Poultry Science Association (PSA).

Founded in 1973, ARPAS is headquartered in Champaign, Illinois, with Fass who provide services for ARPAS.

== History ==
Organizing ARPAS began in 1970 with the appointment of an organizing committees at the joint meeting of the ASAS, ADSA and PSA. However, nothing came of that effort, and ASAS ventured on its own at its 1972 meeting to create the American Registry of Certified Animal Scientists. By-laws were established in 1975 and 444 members were Grandfathered into it based on their education and experience. Shortly, thereafter, it was decided that a journal would be published. Originally entitled “The Animal Scientist”, it evolved into the “Animal Industry Today”, “The Professional Animal Scientist” and currently "Applied Animal Science."

In 1984, ASAS concluded that ARPAS should stand on its own and created a transition team to initiate its independent status. ARPAS secured it ties with its five professional societies over the proceeding next 10 years. An Examining Board Chair position was established and still exists today as a paid position. In 1997 ARPAS established the position of Executive Director/Executive Vice President to oversee its operations which has proven as very beneficial.,

In 1995, ARPAS adopted the “College” system to provide board certification for higher level professional animal scientists to gain additional credentials. In the late 1980s ARPAS chapters were initiated, the first chapters being Washington DC Area and the California chapters, respectively. Today, there are eight chapters.,

ARPAS has initiated several outreach programs. One such program was started in 2001 for the education and certification of Technicians for the Natural Resource Conversation Service's Feed Management service.,

== Certifications ==
There are two levels of certification:.

The first level has three subdivisions that all require specific testing. The first is a Professional Animal Scientist (PAS) who must hold a B.S., M.S. or PhD in Animal Science or a closely related field. The second is a Registered Animal Specialist (RAS) and the third is a Registered Animal Product Specialist (RAPS). <6> While neither of these require a degree, both require six years of experience and testing, and must be nominated by a PAS. All the subdivisions offer an Associate level of certification as a preliminary path to full certification.

The second level is Board Certification which is open to those PAS that have a minimum of an M.S. degree and meet the education and experience level set by the American College of Animal Scientists, established by ARPAS for this purpose. Qualified PAS members can be board certified in the disciplines of Animal Behavior, Animal Food Science, Animal Genetics, Animal Nutrition, Animal Physiology and/or Animal Welfare Science.

To maintain their certifications, members must complete 16 continuing education units (CEU) each year. Approved CEU courses/events are posted on the ARPAS web site.,

== Meetings ==
ARPAS holds its annual meeting in conjunction with one of its affiliated societies. Most recently, it has been in conjunction with ASAS and ADSA.<2> It holds its business meetings and sponsors a scientific symposium of interest to PAS at each of these meetings. The ARPAS chapters generally hold annual scientific symposia, conferences, or monthly noon luncheons featuring speaker.,

== Publications ==
ARPAS publishes the journal Applied Animal Science four times per year; it is available in electronic copy. In addition to ARPAS news, it contains peer-reviewed manuscripts in applied animal science. ARPAS also publishes a newsletter, emailed to its members three times per year.

== Chapters ==
ARPAS has about 8 regional chapters. Chapters with 50 or more active PAS members have a representative on the ARPAS Governing Council.,
