= Progeny testing =

Agricultural process

Progeny testing is a test of the value for selective breeding of an individual's genotype by looking at the progeny produced by different matings.

== Uses ==
It is used in the breeding of both plants and animals, but is most commercially important in animal breeding to determine the true breeding value of an animal (especially males) which are used extensively for propagation of best germplasm. The extensive use of artificial insemination in domestic animals has helped in increasing the selection intensity on male animals. This selection tool is usually used for characters that are sex-limited, expressed after death (meat characteristics) and usually with low heritability, for example, milk or egg production in females. A bull, for example, cannot be assessed for milk production, however, the performance of its female offspring can be used to determine the use of the animal for future crosses.

== Process ==
A progeny test is performed by mating the male with a number of females to produce many progeny in a different environment and over a long time period involving different seasons to nullify the impact of season, management and environment in breeding value estimation. The average performance of the offspring is then found, giving a measure of the male's respective value to the breeder.

In animals, the progeny testing could be conducted in a large herd or involving associated herds or in the field in farmers place. The field-based progeny testing is highly required when the selected bulls are to be distributed in a large area to many farmers in different environments. Conducting a field-based progeny testing, especially in smallholder production systems of Asia and Africa, require huge resources both financial and infrastructural - a large AI network, robust and dynamic data collection and analysis system. Usually, the breeding companies conduct progeny testing of their bulls so that they can be commercially promoted. But when the breeding organisations are Government controlled (e.g. India), the onus of conducting the testing also lies with them if required genetic improvement is to be achieved.
