= Tandem selection =

Tandem selection is a method of artificial selection in which useful traits are selected for sequentially. For instance, one could select for both increased milk yield and increased milk fat content in cows via tandem selection by first selecting those with the best of one trait, production of high milk yield, and then when that trait is at a satisfactory level, by starting to select for those cows that produce milk with the greatest milk fat content instead. However, for cows to produce milk with greater fat content, yield may have to go down due to limits of the cows metabolism. So while cows are being selected based on increased milk fat content, the yield of milk they are producing may also go down, thus reversing the selection process previously performed to increase it.

Therefore, tandem selection has a major disadvantage to other major types of artificial selection for multiple traits, such as culling and index selection, as there is a tendency for the last trait to be lost as the next is being selected.
