= John Hammond (physiologist) =

English physiologist (1889–1964)

- Born: 23 February 1889 in Briston, Norfolk
- Died: 25 August 1964 (aged 75)
- Education: Downing College, Cambridge
- Known for: Artificial insemination
- Awards: Fellow of the Royal Society
- Scientific career
- Workplaces: University of Cambridge

Sir John Hammond CBE FRS PhD (23 February 1889 – 25 August 1964), was a physiologist, agricultural research scientist, veterinarian known for his pioneering work in artificial insemination. He gives his name to the Sir John Hammond Memorial Prize.

== Background and education ==
The son of Burrell Hammond, a farmer in Briston, Norfolk, Hammond was educated at Gresham's School and Downing College, Cambridge. He was named after his grandfather, another John Hammond, who was both a farmer and a veterinarian and one of the founders of the Red Poll herdbook in the 1870s.

== Career ==
Hammond arrived at Downing as an undergraduate in 1907 and for most of his career was a Fellow of the college. He also headed the School of Physiology of Animal Reproduction of the University of Cambridge and was a founder of the Cambridge Animal Research Station.

Hammond conducted classical studies on embryo survival in the early 1920s. His famous study Rate of Intra-uterine Growth (1938) showed that crossbred foetal foals grew at the rate of their dams' pure breed. He was the first to crystallise the theory of metabolic rate-dependent prioritising of nutrient partitioning between tissues. He was also the first to report the duration of oestrus for lactating cows (19.3 hours) and heifers (16.1 hours). He studied closely the major changes in animal shape resulting from the domestication and selective breeding of farm animals.

With Arthur Walton, Hammond was one of the pioneers of artificial insemination ('AI'). As he couldn't practice certain AI techniques in England, because of religious and cultural taboos, Hammond sponsored work in other countries where such limitations did not apply. He sent a colleague, Dr Luis Thomasset, to Russia to work on AI with the Soviets. He himself introduced AI to other countries, such as Argentina.

His book The Artificial Insemination of Cattle (1947) was the first comprehensive publication on AI published in England.

Hammond founded the British Cattle Breeders Club in 1946 and was an active member in the early days of the European Association for Animal Production, serving on its Preparatory Committee.

He ended his life as the guru of the British livestock world and is widely regarded as the father of modern animal physiology. His two sons, John Hammond, Jr., and Christopher Hammond (who died in 2002), followed him in his work.

== Publications ==
- Rate of Intra-uterine Growth by J. Hammond and A. Walton, in Proceedings of the Royal Society, B, 125, 311 (1938)
- Anatomical and histological changes during the oestrous cycle in the mare, by John Hammond and Kazimierz Wodzicki
- Hammond, John, et al., The Artificial Insemination of Cattle (Cambridge, Heffer, 1947, 61pp)
- Hammond's Farm Animals by John Hammond (5th edition, 1984, revised by John Hammond Jr.)
- Farm Animals, their Breeding, Growth, and Inheritance by John Hammond (1940)
- Farm Animals by Sir John Hammond, new edition ed. J. Hammond, John C. Bowman and T.J. Robinson (Edward Arnold, London, 1982)
- Cattle at the Crossroads – Containing radio broadcasts by John Hammond on the Home Service of the BBC on Cattle Breeding, from the Series Farming Today (Littlebury & Co., 1944)
- Animal Breeding by John Hammond (1963)

== Honours ==
- Fellow of the Royal Society, 1933
- Commander of the Order of Orange-Nassau, 1946
- Commander of the Order of the British Empire, 1949
- Commander of the Order of Merit of the Republic (Italy), 1954
- Knight, 1960
- First recipient of the David Black Award, 1960
- Honorary DSc, University of Leeds, 1961
- International Stockman's Educational Foundation Hall of Fame Award (posthumous, 1988)

In his memory, the British Society of Animal Science gives a Sir John Hammond Award annually.

A Hammond Lecture was established in 1980 by the former Society for the Study of Fertility as a memorial lecture in honour of Sir John Hammond, and until 2002 was presented at the winter meetings of the Society for Reproduction and Fertility by a scientist recognised for the practical application of reproductive research to agriculture.
