= Animal Science (journal) =

- Discipline: Animal science
- Language: English
- Edited by: Hilary Davies

Publication details
- Former name(s): Animal Production
- History: 1959–2006
- Publisher: Cambridge University Press on behalf of the British Society of Animal Science (United Kingdom)
- Frequency: Bimonthly
- Impact factor: 1.071 (2005)

Standard abbreviations
- ISO 4: Anim. Sci.

Indexing
- ISSN: 1357-7298 (print); 1748-748X (web)
- OCLC no.: 701463537

Links
- Journal homepage; Online archive

Animal Science was a peer-reviewed scientific journal covering research in animal science, animal biology, and animal production, published by Cambridge University Press. It was the main journal of the British Society of Animal Science and was established in 1959. The last issue was published in 2006 and it was subsequently merged with two other journals to become Animal.

== History ==
In 1959 the society established the journal as Animal Production. It was published in three issues per year in 1961, and four issues per year in 1971. In 1995, the journal was renamed Animal Science.

In 2000, the editor-in-chief Tony Lawrence retired, with Hilary Davies taking over. According to the Journal Citation Reports, the journal has a 2005 impact factor of 1.071, ranking it 19th out of 44 journals in the category "Agriculture, Dairy & Animal Science".
