= Journal of Animal Science =

- Discipline: Agriculture, zoology
- Language: English

Publication details
- History: 1910-present
- Publisher: American Society of Animal Science
- Frequency: Monthly
- Impact factor: 3.7 (2025)

Standard abbreviations
- ISO 4: J. Anim. Sci.

Indexing
- ISSN: 0021-8812 (print); 1525-3163 (web)

Links
- Journal homepage; Online access; Online archive

The Journal of Animal Science is a peer-reviewed scientific journal in the field of animal science. It is published by the American Society of Animal Science.
