= Animal (journal) =

Academic journal

- Discipline: Animal science
- Language: English
- Edited by: Isabelle Louveau

Publication details
- History: 2007–present
- Publisher: Elsevier
- Frequency: Monthly
- Open access: Yes
- License: CC-BY
- Impact factor: 4.2 (2024)

Standard abbreviations
- ISO 4: Animal

Indexing
- ISSN: 1751-7311

Links
- Journal homepage

Animal: The International Journal of Animal Bioscience is a scientific journal established February 2007 and published monthly by Elsevier. It is owned by the British Society of Animal Science, the Institut national de recherche pour l’agriculture, l’alimentation et l’environnement, and the European Federation of Animal Science. Associated parties include IRTA, Agroscope, and Wageningen University & Research. The journal publishes the best, innovative and cutting-edge science that relates to animals (farmed or managed) used for animal production, and that is relevant to whole animal outcomes, and/or to animal management practices.

It is a merger of three journals:

- Animal Science - ISSN 1357-7298
- Animal Research - ISSN 0003-424X/ISSN 1627-3583
- Reproduction, Nutrition, Development - ISSN 0926-5287/ISSN 0926-5309
