= Animal studies (disambiguation) =

Animal studies is the interdisciplinary study of animals including anthropology, biology, history, psychology, and philosophy.

Animal studies or animal research may refer to:

- Animal testing or animal experimentation, the use of non-human animals in experiments
- Ethology, the study of animal behavior
- Anthrozoology, the study of human-animal interaction
- Animality studies, an academic field focused on the cultural study of animals
- Animal science, the study of animals under human use
- Zoology, the scientific study of animals, encompassing many of the above disciplines
