= German Society for Animal Breeding =

Specialist association

Deutsche Gesellschaft für Züchtungskunde e.V.
- Abbreviation: DGfZ
- Formation: 1905
- Type: Scientific
- Purpose: Research
- Location: Bonn
- Region served: Germany
- President: Otto-Werner Marquardt
- Website: www.dgfz-bonn.de

The German Society for Animal Breeding in German: Deutsche Gesellschaft für Züchtungskunde e.V. (DGfZ) is a specialist association which sees itself as a link in the area of livestock science, in that brings together science, administration and practice (including intermediate areas) over all species of animal.

== Mission and Structure ==
The DGfZ was formed in 1905 as a non-profit organization with its seat in Bonn (Germany). It officially represents Germany at the European Federation of Animal Science (EAAP) and is thus financially sponsored by the Bundesministerium für Ernährung, Landwirtschaft und Verbraucherschutz (Federal Ministry for Nutrition, Agriculture and Consumer Protection)

The official organ of the DGfZ is the journal Züchtungskunde (Breeding Science published by the Ulmer Verlag. In addition, it organises symposia, lectures and workshops at which European research results are discussed and market analysis carried out.

The following working groups are active:

- the Genetic-Statistic Committee
- the Animal Genetics Advisory Board
- the Working Group for Foodstuffs of Animal Origin
- the Drafting Committee and the Editorial Staff of the journal Animal Breeding

Students of animal science are supported with stipendia and financial aid. Those who have significantly contributed to the field of animal science and veterinary medicine are honoured with the Hermann-von-Nathusius-Medal, the Adolf-Koeppe-Badge (named after Adolf Koeppe) or with honorary membership of the DGfZ.

== Previous Honorary Members ==
- 2013 Leo Siebers, Kleve-Rindern
- 2010 Ernst-Jürgen Lode, Woldegk (honorary president)
- 2009 Ernst Kalm, Kiel
- 2007 William Hill, Edinburgh, UK
- 2006 Heinz-Werner Lehmann, Uelzen
- 2005 Roland Ulmer, Stuttgart
- 2004 Franz Schmitten, Bonn
- 2003 Klaus Meyn, Königswinter
- 2002 Hermann Trautwein, Nürtingen; Philipp R. Fürst zu Solms-Lich, Lich, as honorary president
- 2001 Maurice Bichard, Abingdon/Oxon, England
- 1998 Jan Philipsson, Uppsala (Sweden)
- 1997 Janos Dohy, Gödöllö (Hungary)
- 1996 Franc Habe, Ljubljana, (Slovenia)
- 1994 Jean Boyazoglu, Rom (Italy)
- 1993 Eberhard Thyssen, Herrsching am Ammersee
- 1992 Diedrich Richard Osterhoff, Pretoria (Republic of South Africa); Diedrich Schröder, Wilhelminenhof, as honorary president.
- 1991 Arne Roos, Örkelljunga (Sweden)
- 1989 Alessandro Nardone, Viterbo (Italy)
- 1987 Georg Schönmuth, Berlin
- 1986 Kristòf von Kàllay, Rom (Italy)
- 1985 Patrick Cunningham, Dublin (Ireland)
- 1981 Wolfgang von Scharfenberg, Wanfried, as honorary president; Walther Baier, Munich; Robert Winnigstedt, Bonn; G. Hahl; Karl Schimmelpfennig, Oldenburg i.O.; André-Max Leroy, Paris (France); Adolf Köppe, Norden; Johannes Hansen, Berlin; Felix Hoesch; Wilhelm Zorn, Tschechnitz, as honorary chairman; Wilhelm Niklas, München, as honorary president.
