= Charles Roy Henderson =

American mathematician (1911–1989)

- Born: April 1, 1911; Coin, Iowa, US
- Died: March 14, 1989 (aged 77); Urbana, Illinois, US
- Education: Iowa State University
- Known for: Best linear unbiased prediction (BLUP); Mixed models; Variance component estimation
- Scientific career
- Fields: Biostatistics; Genetics
- Workplaces: Cornell University; University of Illinois; University of Guelph
- Doctoral advisor: Lenoy Nelson Hazel; Oscar Kempthorne
- Doctoral students: Shayle R. Searle

Charles Roy Henderson (April 1, 1911 – March 14, 1989) was an American statistician and a pioneer in animal breeding — the application of quantitative methods for the genetic evaluation of domestic livestock. This is critically important because it allows farmers and geneticists to predict whether a crop or animal will have a desired trait, and to what extent the trait will be expressed. He developed mixed model equations to obtain best linear unbiased predictions of breeding values and, in general, any random effect. He invented three methods for the estimation of variance components in unbalanced settings of mixed models, and invented a method for constructing the inverse of Wright's numerator relationship matrix based on a simple list of pedigree information. He, with his Ph.D. student Shayle R. Searle, greatly extended the use of matrix notation in statistics. His methods are widely used by the domestic livestock industry throughout the world and are a cornerstone of linear model theory.

Henderson obtained his B.Sc., M.Sc.(nutrition) and Ph.D.(breeding) degrees at Iowa State University, where he was a student of Professor L. N. Hazel. Henderson joined the faculty of the Department of Animal Science at Cornell University in 1948 and headed the Animal Breeding division for nearly 30 years until he retired in 1976. After retiring from Cornell, he was a visiting professor at the University of Guelph and University of Illinois until his death. He completed his book in 1984 at the University of Guelph.

== Honors and awards ==
- 1955, Senior Fulbright Research Scholar (New Zealand)
- 1964, Borden Award, American Dairy Science Association
- 1964, Animal Breeding and Genetics Award, American Society of Animal Science
- 1969, Fellow, American Statistical Association
- 1971, Morrison Award, American Society of Animal Science
- 1977, National Association of Animal Breeders Award, American Dairy Science Association
- 1980, Member of the Massey University Wellington
- 1981, Visiting professor at the University of California, Davis
- 1981, Hermann-von-Nathusius-Medaille in Gold of the German Society for Animal Production (DGfZ)
- 1981, Fellow, American Society of Animal Science
- 1982, Jay L. Lush Animal Breeding and Genetics Award, American Dairy Science Association
- 1984, Henry A. Wallace Award for Service to Agriculture, Iowa State University
- 1985, Elected to the United States National Academy of Sciences
