= Animal Science Journal =

- Discipline: Dairy agriculture, animal science
- Language: English
- Edited by: Kazuhiro Kikuchi

Publication details
- History: 1930-present
- Publisher: John Wiley & Sons, Inc. on behalf of the Japanese Society of Animal Science
- Frequency: Monthly
- Impact factor: 2.0 (2022)

Standard abbreviations
- ISO 4: Anim. Sci. J.

Indexing
- CODEN: ASCJFY
- ISSN: 1344-3941 (print); 1740-0929 (web)
- OCLC no.: 226037188

Links
- Journal homepage; Online access; Online archive

Animal Science Journal is a monthly peer-reviewed scientific journal covering research in dairy agriculture and animal science. The journal was established in 1930 and is published by John Wiley & Sons, Inc. on behalf of the Japanese Society of Animal Science. The editor-in-chief is Kazuhiro Kikuchi (Tohoku University).

== Abstracting and indexing ==
The journal is abstracted and indexed in:

- AGRICOLA
- Biological Abstracts
- BIOSIS Previews (Thomson Reuters)
- CAB Abstracts
- CABI databases
- Chemical Abstracts Service
- Current Contents/Agriculture, Biology & Environmental Sciences
- EBSCO databases
- Elsevier BIOBASE
- Food Science & Technology Abstracts
- Index Medicus/MEDLINE/PubMed
- ProQuest databases
- Science Citation Index Expanded
- Scopus
- The Zoological Record

According to the Journal Citation Reports, the journal has a 2020 impact factor of 2.0.
