= Index selection =

Index selection is a method of artificial selection in which several useful traits are selected simultaneously. First, each trait that is going to be selected is assigned a weight – the importance of the trait. I.e., if you were selecting for both height and the coat darkness in dogs, if height were the more important of the two one would assign that a higher weighting. For instance, height's weighting could be ten and coat darkness could be one. This weighting value is then multiplied by the observed value in each individual animal and then the score for each of the characteristics is summed for each individual. This result is the index score and can be used to compare the worth of each organism being selected. Therefore, only those with the highest index score are selected for breeding via artificial selection.

This method has advantages over other methods of artificial selection, such as tandem selection, in that you can select for traits simultaneously rather than sequentially. Thereby, no useful traits are being excluded from selection at any one time and so none will stagnate or reverse while you concentrate on improving another property of the organism. However, its major disadvantage is that the weightings assigned to each characteristic are inherently quite hard to calculate precisely and so require some elements of trial and error before they become optimal to the breeder.

The selection index theory is well described in Erling Strandberg and Birgitte Malmfors's notes under the headings Genetic Evaluation. Calculation of a selection index based on actual data can be carried out using an applet made by Knud Christensen. The applet can be found here
