= Shayle R. Searle =

New Zealand mathematician (1928–2013)

Shayle Robert Searle PhD (26 April 1928 – 18 February 2013) was a New Zealand mathematician who was professor emeritus of biological statistics at Cornell University. He was a prominent figure in the fields of linear and mixed models in statistics. He also published widely on the topics of linear models, mixed models, and variance component estimation.

Searle was one of the first statisticians to use matrix algebra in statistical methodology, and was an early proponent of the use of applied statistical techniques in animal breeding.

He died at his home in Ithaca, New York.

== Education ==
- BA – Victoria University of Wellington – 1949
- MSc – Victoria University of Wellington – 1950
- PhD – Cornell University – 1958
- DSc (h.c.) – Victoria University of Wellington – 2005

== Employment ==
- Research statistician – New Zealand Dairy Board – 1953 to 1955, 1959 to 1962
- Statistician – University Computing Center, Cornell University – 1962 to 1965
- Professor of biological statistics – Cornell University – 1965 to 1996

== Honours ==
- Winner, Humboldt Research Award of the Alexander von Humboldt Foundation
- Fellow, American Statistical Association
- Fellow, Royal Statistical Society
- Honorary Fellow, Royal Society of New Zealand

== Bibliography ==
=== Books ===
- Shayle R. Searle (2009). The Collected Works of Shayle R. Searle. New York: Wiley. ISBN 978-0-470-55606-1.
- Neuhaus, John William; McCulloch, Charles E.; Shayle R. Searle (2008). Generalized, Linear, and Mixed Models (Wiley Series in Probability and Statistics) (2nd ed.). New York: Wiley-Interscience. ISBN 978-0-470-07371-1.
- Shayle R. Searle (2006). Linear Models for Unbalanced Data (Wiley Series in Probability and Statistics). New York: Wiley-Interscience. ISBN 0-470-04004-1.
- McCulloch, Charles E.; Shayle R. Searle; Casella, George (2006). Variance Components (Wiley Series in Probability and Statistics). New York: Wiley-Interscience. ISBN 0-470-00959-4.
- Shayle R. Searle (2006). Matrix Algebra Useful for Statistics (Wiley Series in Probability and Statistics). New York: Wiley-Interscience. ISBN 0-470-00961-6.
- McCulloch, Charles E.; Searle, Shayle R. (2001). Generalized, Linear, and Mixed Models (1st ed.). Chichester: John Wiley & Sons. ISBN 0-471-19364-X.
- Willett, Lois Schertz; Searle, S. R. (2001). Matrix algebra for applied economics. Chichester: John Wiley & Sons. ISBN 0-471-32207-5.
- Searle, S. R. (1971). Linear models. New York: Wiley. ISBN 0-471-18499-3.
- Hausman, Warren H.; Searle, S. R. (1970). Matrix algebra for business and economics. New York: Wiley-Interscience. ISBN 0-471-76941-X.
- Shayle R. Searle (1966). Matrix Algebra for the Biological Sciences (Series on Quantitative Methods for Biologists & Medical Scientists). John Wiley & Sons Inc. ISBN 0-471-76930-4.

=== Selected journal articles ===
2000s

- Cowpertwait, P.; Wake, G.; Anderson, R. D.; Edwards, H.; Searle, S. (2007). "Statistics and applied probability: a tribute to Jeffrey J. Hunter". Journal of Applied Mathematics and Decision Sciences. 2007: 1–4. doi:10.1155/2007/57619 (inactive 15 September 2025).
- Searle, SR (2005). "Recollections from a 50-year random walk midst matrices, statistics and computing". Research Letters in the Information and Mathematical Sciences. 8: 45–52. ISSN 1175-2777. Archived from the original on 14 October 2008.
- Costa, C. N.; Blake, R. W.; Pollak, E. J.; Oltenacu, P. A.; Quaas, R. L.; Searle, S. R. (2000). "Genetic Analysis of Holstein Cattle Populations in Brazil and the United States". Journal of Dairy Science. 83 (12): 2963–2974. doi:10.3168/jds.S0022-0302(00)75196-4. PMID 11132868.
- Searle, SR (2000). "The infusion of matrices into statistics" (PDF). The Bulletin of the International Linear Algebra Society. 24: 25–32.

1990s

- Searle, SR (1999). "Comments from thirty years of teaching matrix algebra to applied statisticians" (PDF). The Bulletin of the International Linear Algebra Society (22): 3–5.
- Searle, S. R. (1998). "Winning Probabilities of Lotto in the United States". Chance. 11. American Statistical Association: 20–25. doi:10.1080/09332480.1998.10542073.
- Searle, S. R. (1997). "Built-In Restrictions on Best Linear Unbiased Predictors (BLUP) of Random Effects in Mixed Models". The American Statistician. 51 (1): 19–21. doi:10.2307/2684686. hdl:1813/31824. JSTOR 2684686.
- Searle, SR (1997). "Selecting high-producing farm animals – With help from statistics". Chance, New Directions for Statistics and Computers. 10 (2): 15–18.
- Searle, S. R. (1997). "The matrix Handling of BLUE and BLUP in the mixed linear model". Linear Algebra and Its Applications. 264: 291–311. doi:10.1016/S0024-3795(96)00400-4. hdl:1813/31864.
- McCulloch, C. E.; Searle, S. R. (1995). "On an Identity Derived from Unbiasedness in Linear Models" (PDF). The American Statistician. 49 (1): 39–42. doi:10.2307/2684809. hdl:1813/31745. JSTOR 2684809.
- Searle, S. R. (1995). "An overview of variance component estimation". Metrika. 42: 215–230. doi:10.1007/BF01894301. hdl:1813/31816. S2CID 122756737.
- Searle, Shayle (1995). "Comments on J. A. Nelder. 'The statistics of linear models: back to basics'". Statistics and Computing. 5 (2): 103–107. doi:10.1007/BF00143939. S2CID 119967856.
- Searle, S. R. (1994). "Extending some results and proofs for the singular linear model". Linear Algebra and Its Applications. 210: 139–201. doi:10.1016/0024-3795(94)90469-3. hdl:1813/31746.
- Searle, S. R. (1994). "Analysis of Variance Computing Package Output for Unbalanced Data from Fixed-Effects Models with Nested Factors". The American Statistician. 48 (2): 148–153. doi:10.2307/2684275. hdl:1813/31786. JSTOR 2684275.
- Yu, H.; Searle, S. R.; McCulloch, C. E. (1994). "Properties of maximum likelihood estimators of variance components in the one-way classification, balanced data". Communications in Statistics - Simulation and Computation. 23 (4): 897. doi:10.1080/03610919408813207. hdl:1813/31711.
- Loynes, R; Searle, S; Casella, G; McCulloch, Charles (1994). "Variance Components". Biometrics. 50: 1224. doi:10.2307/2533462. JSTOR 2533462.
- Searle, Shayle; Casella, George; MacCulloch, Charles (1994). "Variance Components". Journal of the American Statistical Association. 89. doi:10.2307/2291239. JSTOR 2291239.
- Westfall, Peter; Searle, S; Casella, G; McCulloch, Charles (1993). "Variance Components". Journal of Marketing Research. 30: 258. doi:10.2307/3172833. JSTOR 3172833.
- Searle, S. R. (1993). Analysis of variance computing then and now, with reference to unbalanced data (PDF). 18th SAS Users’ Group Conference. New York. pp. 1077–1087.
- Searle, S. R. (1991). "C. R. Henderson, the Statistician; and His Contributions to Variance Components Estimation" (PDF). Journal of Dairy Science. 74 (11): 4035–4044. doi:10.3168/jds.S0022-0302(91)78599-8. hdl:1813/31657. PMID 1757641.
- Henderson, H. V.; Searle, S. R. (1990). "Generalized dispersion matrices for covariance structural analysis". Linear Algebra and Its Applications. 127: 543–565. doi:10.1016/0024-3795(90)90361-F. hdl:1813/32786.

1980s

- Searle, Shayle (1989). "Variance components – some history and summary account of estimation methods". Journal of Animal Breeding and Genetics. 106 (1–6): 1–29. doi:10.1111/j.1439-0388.1989.tb00209.x. hdl:1813/33072.
- Searle, S. R. (1989). "Obituary: Charles Roy Henderson 1911–1989". Biometrics. 45 (4): 1333–1335. JSTOR 2531789.
- Searle, SR (1989). "Obituary: Charles Roy Henderson, 1911–1989". Bulletin of the Institute of Mathematical Statistics. 18: 338.
- Searle, S. R. (1989). "The Equality of the Ordinary Least Squares Estimator and the Best Linear Unbiased Estimator: Comment". The American Statistician. 43 (3): 162–163. doi:10.2307/2685064. JSTOR 2685064.
- Searle, Shayle (1989). "Statistical Computing Packages: Some Words of Caution". American Statistician. 43 (4): 189–190. doi:10.1080/00031305.1989.10475656.
- Searle, S. R. (1988). "Annotated Computer Output, Second Edition: ACO_{2}". The American Statistician. 42 (4): 272. doi:10.2307/2685138. JSTOR 2685138.
- Searle, S. R. (1988). "Mixed models and unbalanced data: Wherefrom, whereat and whereto?". Communications in Statistics - Theory and Methods. 17 (4): 935–968. doi:10.1080/03610928808829667. hdl:1813/33040.
- Searle, S. R. (1988). "Parallel Lines in Residual Plots". The American Statistician. 42 (3): 211. doi:10.2307/2685008. hdl:1813/33060. JSTOR 2685008.
- Searle, SR (1988). "Best linear unbiased estimation in mixed models of the analysis of variance". In J. Srivastava (ed.). Probability and Statistics Essays in Honor of Franklin A. Graybill. Amsterdam: North-Holland.
- Ziegel, Eric; McCulloch, Charles; Schwager, Steven; Casella, George; Searle, Shayle (1988). "Statistical Design: Theory and Practice". Technometrics. 30. doi:10.2307/1270187. JSTOR 1270187.
- Mcculloch, C.E.; Schwager, S.J.; Casella, G.; Searle, SR, eds. (1986). Statistical Design: Theory and Practice: Proc. of a Conference in Honor of Walter T. Federer. Ithaca, NY: Cornell University.
- Searle, S. R.; Pukelsheim, F. (1986). "Effects of Intraclass Correlation on Weighted Averages" (PDF). The American Statistician. 40 (2): 103–105. doi:10.2307/2684865. hdl:1813/32989. JSTOR 2684865.
- Searle, S. R.; Pukelsheim, F. (1985). "Establishing χ^{2} Properties of Sums of Squares Using Induction". The American Statistician. 39 (4): 301–303. doi:10.2307/2683710. JSTOR 2683710.
- Anderson, R. D., Henderson, HV, Pukelsheim, F., Searle, SR (1984). "Best estimation of variance components from balanced data, with arbitrary kurtosis". Mathematische Operationsforschung und Statistik, Series Statistics. 15 (2): 163–176. doi:10.1080/02331888408801755. hdl:1813/32795.
- Manfredi, E. J.; Everett, R. W.; Searle, S. R. (1984). "Phenotypic and Genetic Statistics of Components of Milk and Two Measures of Somatic Cell Concentration". Journal of Dairy Science. 67 (9): 2028–2033. doi:10.3168/jds.S0022-0302(84)81539-8. PMID 6541666.
- Searle, S. R. (1984). "Restrictions and Generalized Inverses in Linear Models". The American Statistician. 38 (1): 53–54. doi:10.2307/2683560. hdl:1813/32898. JSTOR 2683560.
- Searle, S. R.; Swallow, W. H.; McCulloch, C. E. (1984). "Nontestable Hypotheses in Linear Models". SIAM Journal on Algebraic and Discrete Methods. 5 (4): 486–496. doi:10.1137/0605047. hdl:1813/32926.
- Henderson, H.V.; Pukelsheim, F.; Searle, S.R. (1983). "On the history of the Kronecker product". Linear and Multilinear Algebra. 14 (2): 113–120. doi:10.1080/03081088308817548. hdl:1813/32834.
- Searle, S. R.; Henderson, H. V. (1983). "Faults in a computing algorithm for reparameterizing linear models". Communications in Statistics - Simulation and Computation. 12: 67–76. doi:10.1080/03610918308812300.
- Searle, S. R.; Hudson, G. F. S.; Federer, W. T. (1983). "Annotated Computer Output for Analysis of Covariance". The American Statistician. 37 (2): 172–173. doi:10.2307/2685886. JSTOR 2685886.
- Searle, S. R. (1983). "The Recurrence Formulae for Means and Variances". Teaching Statistics. 5: 7–10. doi:10.1111/j.1467-9639.1983.tb00481.x. hdl:1813/32866.
- Hudson, G. F. S.; Searle, S. R. (1982). Hypothesis Testing with Type IV Sums of Squares of the Computer Routine SAS GLM (PDF). SUGI 1982.
- Searle, S. R.; Hudson, G. F. S. (1982). "Some Distinctive Features of Output from Statistical Computing Packages for Analysis of Covariance". Biometrics. 38 (3): 737–745. doi:10.2307/2530053. hdl:1813/32863. JSTOR 2530053.
- Henderson, H. V.; Searle, S. R. (1981). "On Deriving the Inverse of a Sum of Matrices". SIAM Review. 23 (1): 53–60. doi:10.1137/1023004. hdl:1813/32750.
- Henderson, H. V.; Searle, S. R. (1981). "The vec-permutation matrix, the vec operator and Kronecker products: A review". Linear and Multilinear Algebra. 9 (4): 271. doi:10.1080/03081088108817379. hdl:1813/32747.
- Searle, S. R. (1981). "Annotated Computer Output for Variance Components". The American Statistician. 35 (2): 111–112. doi:10.2307/2683158. JSTOR 2683158.
- Searle, S. R.; Speed, F. M.; Henderson, H. V. (1981). "Some Computational and Model Equivalences in Analyses of Variance of Unequal-Subclass-Numbers Data". The American Statistician. 35 (1): 16–33. doi:10.2307/2683578. hdl:1813/32769. JSTOR 2683578.
- Searle, SR (1981). "Quirks in linear model calculations with unbalanced data" (PDF). Proceedings of the Sixth Annual SAS Users Group International Conference: 38–45.
- Searle, S. R. (1980). "Arbitrary hypotheses in linear mod fi.S with unbalanced data". Communications in Statistics - Theory and Methods. 9 (2): 181–200. doi:10.1080/03610928008827870.
- Searle, S. R.; Firey, P. A. (1980). "Computer Generation of Data Sets for Homework Exercises in Simple Regression". The American Statistician. 34 (1): 51–54. doi:10.2307/2682999. hdl:1813/32759. JSTOR 2682999.
- Searle, S. R.; Speed, F. M.; Milliken, G. A. (1980). "Population Marginal Means in the Linear Model: An Alternative to Least Squares Means". The American Statistician. 34 (4): 216–221. doi:10.2307/2684063. JSTOR 2684063.

1970s

- Searle, S.R. (1979). "On inverting circulant matrices". Linear Algebra and Its Applications. 25: 77–89. doi:10.1016/0024-3795(79)90007-7. hdl:1813/32683.
- Henderson, H. V.; Searle, S. R. (1979). "Vec and Vech Operators for Matrices, with Some Uses in Jacobians and Multivariate Statistics". The Canadian Journal of Statistics. 7 (1): 65–81. doi:10.2307/3315017. JSTOR 3315017.
- Searle, S. R. (1979). "Alternative covariance models for the 2-way crossed classification". Communications in Statistics - Theory and Methods. 8 (8): 799–818. doi:10.1080/03610927908827800.
- Searle, S. R. (1979). "Annotated Computer Output for Analysis of Variance of Unequal-Subclass- Numbers Data". The American Statistician. 33 (4): 222–223. doi:10.2307/2683742. JSTOR 2683742.
- Searle, SR (1979). "Discussion of H. Ahrens' An invariance property for first and second order moments of estimated variance-covariance components (19th Session on Stochastics)". Biometrical Journal. 21: 389–398. doi:10.1002/bimj.4710210407. hdl:1813/32735.
- Searle, S. R.; Henderson, H. V. (1979). "Dispersion Matrices for Variance Components Models". Journal of the American Statistical Association. 74 (366): 465–470. doi:10.2307/2286357. JSTOR 2286357.
- Searle, S.R. (1978). "A univariate formulation of the multivariate linear model". In David, H.A. (ed.). Contributions to Survey Sampling and Applied Statistics, Papers in Honor of H.O. Hartley. New York: Academic Press. pp. 181–189. ISBN 978-0122047503.
- Swallow, W. H.; Searle, S. R. (1978). "Minimum Variance Quadratic Unbiased Estimation (MIVQUE) of Variance Components". Technometrics. 20 (3): 265–272. doi:10.2307/1268135. JSTOR 1268135.
- Searle, S. R. (1977). "Proof". International Journal of Mathematical Education in Science and Technology. 8 (2): 185–192. doi:10.1080/0020739770080207.
- Corbeil, R. R.; Searle, S. R. (1976). "A Comparison of Variance Component Estimators". Biometrics. 32 (4): 779–791. doi:10.2307/2529264. hdl:1813/32662. JSTOR 2529264.
- Corbeil, R. R.; Searle, S. R. (1976). "Restricted Maximum Likelihood (REML) Estimation of Variance Components in the Mixed Model". Technometrics. 18 (1): 31–38. doi:10.2307/1267913. JSTOR 1267913.
- Henderson, C. R.; Searle, S. R.; Schaeffer, L. R. (1974). "The Invariance and Calculation of Method 2 for Estimating Variance Components". Biometrics. 30 (4): 583–588. doi:10.2307/2529223. JSTOR 2529223.
- Searle, S. R.; Rounsaville, T. R. (1974). "A Note on Estimating Covariance Components". The American Statistician. 28 (2): 67–68. doi:10.2307/2683606. JSTOR 2683606.
- Searle, S. R. (1973). "On Publishing Extended Abstracts, and Reviews". The American Statistician. 27 (4): 155–157. doi:10.2307/2684045. JSTOR 2684045.
- Rudan, J. W.; Searle, S. R. (1971). "323. Note: Large Sample Variances of Maximum Likelihood Estimators of Variance Components in the 3-Way Nested Classification, Random Model, with Unbalanced Data". Biometrics. 27 (4): 1087–1091. doi:10.2307/2528844. JSTOR 2528844.
- Searle, S. R. (1971). "A Biometrics Invited Paper. Topics in Variance Component Estimation". Biometrics. 27 (1): 1–76. doi:10.2307/2528928. JSTOR 2528928.
- Townsend, E. C.; Searle, S. R. (1971). "Best Quadratic Unbiased Estimation of Variance Components from Unbalanced Data in the 1-Way Classification". Biometrics. 27 (3): 643–657. doi:10.2307/2528602. hdl:1813/32414. JSTOR 2528602.
- Searle, S. R. (1970). "Large Sample Variances of Maximum Likelihood Estimators of Variance Components Using Unbalanced Data". Biometrics. 26 (3): 505–524. doi:10.2307/2529105. JSTOR 2529105.
- Searle, S. R.; Fawcett, R. F. (1970). "Expected Mean Squares in Variance Components Models Having Finite Populations". Biometrics. 26 (2): 243–254. doi:10.2307/2529072. JSTOR 2529072.

1960s

- Hartley, H. O.; Searle, S. R. (1969). "A Discontinuity in Mixed Model Analyses". Biometrics. 25 (3): 573–576. doi:10.2307/2528909. JSTOR 2528909.
- Searle, S. R. (1969). "Correlation Between Means of Parts and Wholes". The American Statistician. 23 (2): 23–24. doi:10.2307/2681294. JSTOR 2681294.
- Searle, SR (1968). "A remark on solving equations in sums of powers". Journal of the Royal Statistical Society, Series B. 30 (3): 567–569. doi:10.1111/j.2517-6161.1968.tb00756.x.
- Searle, S. R. (1968). "Another Look at Henderson's Methods of Estimating Variance Components". Biometrics. 24 (4): 749–787. doi:10.2307/2528870. JSTOR 2528870.
- Searle, S. R. (1965). "The Value of Indirect Selection: I. Mass Selection". Biometrics. 21 (3): 682–707. doi:10.2307/2528550. JSTOR 2528550. PMID 5858099.
- Searle, SR (1965). "Additional results concerning estimable functions and generalized inverse matrices". Journal of the Royal Statistical Society, Series B. 27 (3): 486–490. doi:10.1111/j.2517-6161.1965.tb00608.x.
- Searle, S. R. (1963). "The efficiency of ancestor records in animal selection". Heredity. 18 (3): 351–821. Bibcode:1963Hered..18..351S. doi:10.1038/hdy.1963.35. PMID 14058937.
- Searle, S. R. (1961). "Variance Components in the Unbalanced 2-Way Nested Classification". The Annals of Mathematical Statistics. 32 (4): 1161–1166. doi:10.1214/aoms/1177704854.
- Searle, S. R.; Henderson, C. R. (1961). "Computing Procedures for Estimating Components of Variance in the Two-Way Classification, Mixed Model". Biometrics. 17 (4): 607–616. doi:10.2307/2527859. JSTOR 2527859.
- Searle, S. R.; Henderson, C. R. (1960). "Judging the Effectiveness of Age-Correction Factors". Journal of Dairy Science. 43 (7): 966. doi:10.3168/jds.S0022-0302(60)90260-5.
- VanVleck, LD and Searle, SR and Henderson, CR (1960). "The Number of Daughter-Dam Pairs Needed for Estimating Heritability". Journal of Animal Science. 19 (3): 916. doi:10.2527/jas1960.193916x. S2CID 82532852.

1950s

- Henderson, C. R.; Kempthorne, O.; Searle, S. R.; Von Krosigk, C. M. (1959). "The Estimation of Environmental and Genetic Trends from Records Subject to Culling". Biometrics. 15 (2): 192–218. doi:10.2307/2527669. JSTOR 2527669.
- Searle, S. R. (1959). "Use of the Selection Index Method to Account for the Number of Daughters and Records in Progeny-Testing a Dairy Bull". Journal of Dairy Science. 42 (10): 1666–1674. doi:10.3168/jds.S0022-0302(59)90785-4.
- Searle, S. R.; Henderson, C. R. (1959). "Establishing Age-Correction Factors Related to the Level of Herd Production". Journal of Dairy Science. 42 (5): 824. doi:10.3168/jds.S0022-0302(59)90659-9.
- Searle, S. R. (1958). "Sampling Variances of Estimates of Components of Variance". The Annals of Mathematical Statistics. 29: 167–178. doi:10.1214/aoms/1177706713.
- Castle, O. M.; Searle, S. R. (1957). "Repeatability of Dairy Cow Butterfat Records in New Zealand". Journal of Dairy Science. 40 (10): 1277. doi:10.3168/jds.S0022-0302(57)94626-X.
- Callow, E. H.; Searle, S. R. (1956). "Comparative studies of meat V. Factors affecting the iodine number of the fat from the fatty and muscular tissues of cattle". The Journal of Agricultural Science. 48: 61–73. doi:10.1017/S002185960003032X. S2CID 85188693.
- Searle, S. R. (1956). "Matrix Methods in Components of Variance and Covariance Analysis". The Annals of Mathematical Statistics. 27 (3): 737–748. doi:10.1214/aoms/1177728180.
- Searle, SR (1951). "Probability: difficulties of definition". Journal of Institute of Actuaries Students' Society: 204–212.
