= European Federation of Animal Science =

European non-governmental organisation

European Association for Animal Production
- Formation: 8 November 1949
- Type: INGO
- Purpose: improvement of animal husbandry
- Headquarters: Via G. Tomassetti 3, A/1
- Location: Rome, Italy
- President: Matthias Gauly
- Secretary General: Andrea Rosati
- Main organ: council
- Website: www.eaap.org

The European Federation for Animal Science or EAAP (French: Fédération Européenne de Zootechnie; German: Europäische Vereinigung für Tierproduktion; Italian: Federazione Europea di Zootecnia [sic]) is an international non-governmental organisation which aims to improve the farming of domestic animals. Membership is open to scientists, animal breeders and administrators. The association was founded in Paris in 1949, and has its headquarters in Rome, Italy. It was formerly known as the European Association for Animal Production.

Together with the British Society of Animal Science and the Institut national de la recherche agronomique, it issues the academic journal Animal, published by the Cambridge University Press.

== History and purpose ==
The association was founded in Paris during the fifth International Congress on Animal Production. The inaugural meeting was held on 8 November 1949. Although the association was intended to be European in scope, the founding member countries were Austria, Belgium, Denmark, France, Germany, Iran, Italy, Morocco, the Netherlands, Spain, Switzerland and Tunisia, and thus included parts of both Africa and Asia.

In 2023 the association had thirty-six member countries, made up of thirty-one European nations plus Israel, Lebanon, Tunisia, Ukraine and Uzbekistan.
