= Animal breeding =

Branch of animal science

Animal breeding is a branch of animal science concerned with the evaluation and selection of livestock for breeding based on genetic merit. Genetic merit may be estimated using best linear unbiased prediction and other methods to derive estimated breeding values (EBVs). Breeding objectives may include traits related to growth rate, egg, meat, milk, or wool production, as well as reproductive performance, health, and other characteristics relevant to a particular breeding programme. The scientific theory of animal breeding incorporates population genetics, quantitative genetics, statistics, and increasingly molecular genetics, and draws on the pioneering work of Sewall Wright, Jay Lush, and Charles Henderson.

== Breeding stock ==
Breeding stock is a group of animals used for the purpose of planned breeding. When individuals are looking to breed animals, they look for certain valuable traits in purebred animals, or may intend to use some type of crossbreeding to produce a new type of stock with different, and presumably superior abilities in a given area of endeavor. For example, when breeding swine for meat, the "breeding stock should be sound, fast growing, muscular, lean, and reproductively efficient." The "subjective selection of breeding stock" in horses has led to many horse breeds with particular performance traits. While breeding animals is common in an agricultural setting, it is also a common practice for the purpose of selling animals meant as pets, such as cats, dogs, horses, and birds, as well as less common animals, such as reptiles or some primates.

== Purebred breeding ==
Mating animals of the same breed for maintaining such breed is referred to as purebred breeding. Opposite to the practice of mating animals of different breeds, purebred breeding aims to establish and maintain stable traits, that animals will pass to the next generation. By "breeding the best to the best", employing a certain degree of inbreeding, considerable culling, and selection for "superior" qualities, one could develop a bloodline or "breed" superior in certain respects to the original base stock.

Such animals can be recorded with a breed registry, the organisation that maintains pedigrees and/or stud books. The observable phenomenon of hybrid vigor stands in contrast to the notion of breed purity.

For laboratory purposes, organisms such as mice have been inbred to 100% pure lines, as offered for sale by the Jackson laboratory. But this is highly unusual and difficult to do for most organisms, in whose populations all individuals harbor recessive, deleterious gene variants (alleles).

== See also ==
- Animal husbandry

=== Plant and animal breeding ===
- Artificial insemination of livestock and pets
- Artificial selection
- Agricultural science
- Backyard breeder
- Genomics of domestication
- Plant breeding
- Progeny testing
- Selective breeding
- Selection limits

=== People ===
- Robert Bakewell
- Arthur B. Chapman
- James Hutton
- Thomas Lecky

=== Other topics ===
- BLUPF90 and ASReml: software packages for animal breeding statistics
- Veterinary medicine
  - Veterinary surgeon
  - Veterinarian
