= American Society of Animal Science =

American non-profit professional organization

The American Society of Animal Science (ASAS) is a non-profit professional organization for the advancement of livestock, companion animals, exotic animals and meat science. Founded in 1908, ASAS is headquartered in Champaign, Illinois.

ASAS members are involved in university research, education, and extension as well as in the feed, pharmaceutical, and other animal-related industries. Disciplines include nutrition, reproductive physiology, genetics, and behavior of food-producing animals and processing of meat-based products, including beef, pork, and veal.

The organization's mission is described thus: "The American Society of Animal Science is a membership society that supports the careers of scientists and animal producers in the United States and internationally. The American Society of Animal Science fosters the discovery, sharing and application of scientific knowledge concerning the responsible use of animals to enhance human life and well-being."

== History ==
Organizing ASAS (originally called the American Society of Animal Nutrition) began on July 28, 1908, at Cornell University in Ithaca, New York. A committee of animal nutritionists decided to present a plan for the new society during the International Livestock Exposition in Chicago that fall. When the society first officially gathered on November 26, 1908, 33 charter members represented 17 state experiment stations, the U.S. Department of Agriculture and Canada. The goals of the new society were: "(1) to improve the quality of investigation in animal nutrition, (2) to promote more systematic and better correlated study of feeding problems, and (3) to facilitate personal interaction between investigators in this field." During the first year, the society had 100 members join.

At the society business meeting in 1912, the members made plans to broaden the membership base. On November 30, 1915, members changed the society name from the American Society of Animal Nutrition to the American Society of Animal Production. Members passed an amendment to the constitution to include members interested in teaching, breeding, and management investigations as well as nutritionists.

By the 50th anniversary year of the society, in 1958, there were 1829 members. A second name change was approved in 1961, when the official name became the American Society of Animal Science.

In 2008, ASAS celebrated its centennial. As of 2012, the society has more than 5,000 members. Members include animal scientists in academia, the animal industry, and state and federal agencies. The society also has student members and members working in animal and food production.

== Meetings ==
Since 1998, ASAS been holding their annual meetings in convention centers jointly with the American Dairy Science Association (ASDA). ASAS holds yearly meetings for its Western Midwest, Southern and Northeast sections.

ASAS has also held joint meetings with the Asociación Argentina de Producción Animal (AAPA), the Asociación Mexicana de Producción Animal (AMPA), the Canadian Society of Animal Science (CSAS), the Chinese Association of Animal Science and Veterinary Medicine (CAAV), and the Poultry Science Association (PSA). ASAS regularly supports speaker exchanges with the European Federation of Animal Science (EAAP).

In 2012, ASAS began hosting a National Academic Quadrathlon competition at its annual meeting. The Academic Quadrathlon is an undergraduate student competition featuring winning teams from each of the four ASAS sections.

== Publications ==
ASAS's scientific journals are the Journal of Animal Science (JAS) and Translational Animal Science (TAS). JAS is a monthly publication established in 1923 that includes supplemental information regarding abstracts and electronic data.. TAS has a continuous publication model and published peer-reviewed studies focused on "translating animal science research to innovation and application for various segments of the animal industry." ASAS also co-publishes a quarterly review magazine, Animal Frontiers. Each issue of Animal Frontiers focuses on a theme and includes invited articles. In 2012, themes included "Animal Selection," "Animal Production and Water," and "The Science of Animal Welfare."

ASAS also has an online presence. The society publishes an online newsletter called Taking Stock. Graduate student members contribute to a blog called the Graduate BULLetin ("No bull, just the latest society news and career information").

In 2012, ASAS launched a site called AnimalSmart.org. This site presents articles and videos about animal science to the public.

ASAS also supports the USDA National Agricultural Library's Animal Science Image Gallery.
