= Animal science =

Interdisciplinary science dealing with the biology of animals

Animal science is described as "studying the biology of animals that are under the control of humankind". It can also be described as the production and management of farm animals. Historically, the degree was called animal husbandry and the animals studied were livestock species, like ruminant animals such as; cattle, sheep and goat, non-ruminant such as; pigs, poultry, rabbit, snails and horses are studied. Today, courses available look at a broader area, including companion animals, like dogs and cats, and many exotic species. Degrees in Animal Science are offered at a number of colleges and universities. Animal science degrees are often offered at land-grant universities, which will often have on-campus farms to give students hands-on experience with livestock animals.

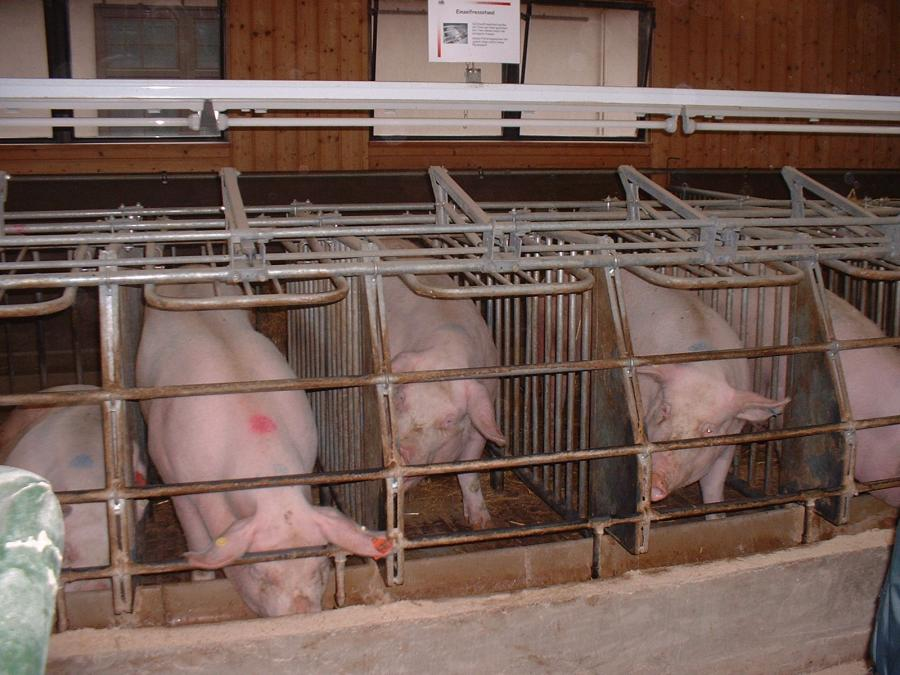
Animal testing with pigs

== Education ==
Professional education in animal science prepares students for careers in areas such as animal breeding, food and fiber production, nutrition, animal agribusiness, animal behavior, animal physiology and welfare. Courses in a typical Animal Science program may include genetics, microbiology, animal behavior, nutrition, physiology, and reproduction. Courses in support areas, such as genetics, soils, agricultural economics and marketing, legal aspects, and the environment also are offered.

=== Bachelor degree ===
At many universities, a Bachelor of Science (BS) degree in Animal Science allows emphasis in certain areas. Typical areas are species-specific or career-specific. Species-specific areas of emphasis prepare students for a career in dairy management, beef management, swine management, sheep or small ruminant management, poultry production, or the horse industry. Other career-specific areas of study include pre-veterinary medicine studies, livestock business and marketing, animal welfare and behavior, animal nutrition science, animal reproduction science, or genetics. Youth programs are also an important part of animal science programs.

==== Pre-veterinary emphasis ====
Many schools that offer a degree option in Animal Science also offer a pre-veterinary emphasis such as Iowa State University, the University of Nebraska–Lincoln, and the University of Minnesota, for example. This option provides knowledge of the biological and physical sciences including nutrition, reproduction, physiology, and genetics. This can prepare students for graduate studies in animal science, veterinary school, and pharmaceutical or animal science industries.

=== Graduate studies ===
In a Master of Science (MS) degree option, students take required courses in areas that support their main interest. These courses are above courses normally required for a Bachelor of Science degree in the Animal Science major. For example, in a Ph.D. degree program students take courses related to their major that are more in-depth than those for the Master of Science degree, with an emphasis on research or teaching.

Graduate studies in animal sciences are considered preparation for upper-level positions in production, management, education, research, or agri-services. Professional study in veterinary medicine, law, and business administration are among the most commonly chosen programs by graduates. Other areas of study include growth biology, physiology, nutrition, and production systems.

== Careers in Animal Science ==
There are a variety of careers available to someone with an animal science degree. Including, but not limited to, Academic researcher, Animal nutritionist, Animal physiotherapist technician, Nature conservation officer, Zookeeper, and Zoologist.

== Areas of study ==
=== Animal Behavior ===
Animal behavior is the study of how animals interact with their environment, interact with each other socially, and how they may achieve understanding of their environment. Animal behavior is examined within the framework of its development, mechanism, adaptive value, and evolution.

=== Animal Genetics ===
Animal genetics is the study of an animal genes and how they effect an animal's appearance, health, and function. The information gained from such studies is often applied to livestock breeding.

=== Veterinary Medicine ===
Veterinary medicine is a specialization within the field of medicine focusing on the diagnosis, prevention, control, and treatment of diseases that effect both wild and domesticated animals. There are three main medical positions within veterinary medicine, veterinarians, veterinary technicians, and veterinary assistants.

== See also ==
- American Registry of Professional Animal Scientists
- Zoology, the interest of all animals.
- Veterinary science
