= Nathusius =

Nathusius is a surname. Notable people with the surname include:

- Annemarie von Nathusius (1874–1926), German novelist
- Elsbeth von Nathusius (1846–1928), German novelist
- Hermann von Nathusius (1809–1879), German animal breeder
- Johann Gottlob Nathusius (1760–1835), German industrialist
- Johanne Philippine Nathusius (1828–1885), German religious philanthropist
- Marie Nathusius (1817–1857), German novelist
- Martin von Nathusius (1843–1906), German theologian
- Philipp von Nathusius (publisher) (1815–1872), German publisher
- Susanne von Nathusius (1850–1929), German portrait painter
- Suzanna von Nathusius, Polish child film actor
- Thomas von Nathusius (1866–1904), German landscape and animal painter
- Wilhelm von Nathusius (1821–1899), German biologist
- Wilhelm von Nathusius (officer) (1856–1937), German Major General

== See also ==
- Nathusius Investments, Polish publisher
- Nathusius's Pipistrelle, bat in the pipistrelle genus
