= Johanne Philippine Nathusius =

German social worker & artist (1828–1885)

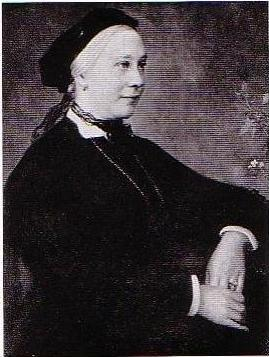
Johanne Nathusius from a painting by the subject's niece, Susanne von Nathusius (1850–1929)

Johanne Philippine Nathusius (18 November 1828 – 28 May 1885) was the founder, in 1861, of the "Elisabethstift", set up as an institution for looking after mentally disabled boys from socially disadvantaged families. As the children grew to adulthood she expanded the remit of the "Elisabethstift" to embrace provision of education, specialist workshops and an auxiliary school for those in her care. Mindful that every individual had his own needs and potential, she took care to ensure that individually suitable employment opportunities were found. She was deeply influenced by her religious beliefs, and convinced that the sick and handicapped who were obliged to live out their lives on the fringes of society, were all loved by God, and she tried to give meaning to the lives of all those for whom she cared through the provision of appropriated education and work chances.

== Life ==
Johanne Nathusius was born into a prosperous - some sources apply the adjective "aristocratic" - family, in Althaldensleben, a small town near Magdeburg in central northern Germany. She was the youngest child of the industrialist-entrepreneur Johann Gottlob Nathusius (1760 – 1835), who was also a substantial landowner in the locality. She grew up in Althaldensleben and nearby Hundisburg. Six of Johanne's seven elder siblings were brothers: all the children were tutored at home. Her later education included several lengthy trips away. The imaginative and witty yet thoughtful letters she wrote to her mother from those youthful travels survive. Her mother, born Luise Engelhard (1787 – 1875), was a daughter of the poet Philippine Gatterer/Englehard (1756 – 1831). From her mother Johanne Nathusius acquired the sober protestant and tolerant religiosity of the Reformed Church.

Aged twelve, Johanne Nathusius fell seriously ill with scarlet fever and typhus: the illnesses left her suffering from periostitis for the rest of her life. Till 1860 she lived mainly in Althaldensleben, after which she moved to Neinstedt, some 20 km to the south, in connection with her care projects. However, following the death of her brother's wife Luise in May 1876, she went back to live in Althaldensleben in order to look after Heinrich's younger children. Johanne spent her final years living with her elder sister in Althaldensleben and was still unmarried in 1885 when she died aged 56.

== Works ==
=== First steps ===
Johanne Nethusius was only 14, still living with her parents in Althaldensleben, when she started to care for the needy. She became involved in the "Mädchenrettungshaus" ("home for orphans and the neglected") set up for girl-children by her brother Philipp von Nathusius in the town, and she also established a sewing and knitting school for young girls, of which she would take charge for the next forty years. Working at her brother's orphanage she was alerted to the particular plight of one girl who was mentally handicapped, and from this she became aware of the wider set of issues confronting such children. Her brother Philipp suggested she should familiarize herself with the so-called "Anstalt für Blöde" (loosely "Institution for the mentally challenged") that had been set up at Neuendettelsau (Lower Bavaria) by the pastor Wilhelm Löhe (1808 – 1872) who was a pioneer of the German "Diakonie Movement". In the event her future actions were greatly influenced both by Löhe's work at Neuendettelsau and by the writings of the pastor Julius Disselhoff (1827 – 1896). During 1852 Disselhoff stayed at Neinstedt, providing inspiration and practical support while working at the Rettungshaus für Knaben "home for orphans and the neglected", set up in the little town two years earlier, for "socially endangered and hard to educate boys", by Johanne's brother Philipp.

In the 1867 annual report of her "Elisabethstift", Johanne Nathusius offered an illustration of why the institution was necessary:

- "S.N. is a very badly afflicted boy, outside the normal scope of most institutions for the mentally handicapped, and already very damaged (...verkommen). When we took him in he smashed up everything, like a wild animal: he yelled and raved, trying to tug at the other children and beat them, and soiling himself disgustingly day and night. After a year [at the Elisabethstift] he was habitually peaceable, orderly and clean."
- "S.N. ist ein sehr tiefstehender Knabe, wie es den meisten Blödsinnigen außerhalb den Anstalten geht, schon sehr verkommen. Bei seiner Aufnahme zertrümmerte und verdarb er alles, wie ein wildes Thier; er schrie und tobte, wollte die anderen Kinder zerren und schlagen und verunreinigte sich Tag und Nacht auf das ekelhafteste. In Jahresfrist hatte er sich doch ziemlich an Ruhe, Ordnung und Reinlichkeit gewöhnt"

In 1858 Johanne Nathusius organised a count of "mentally weak children" ("...von geistesschwachen Kindern") aged between 6 and 12 in the Prussian Province of Saxony. Two of her brothers were members of the Prussian Provincial Parliament ("Provinziallandtag") at the time: they presented her data to the parliament, accompanying it with a plea for the alleviation of the condition of these children. Johanne Nathusius nevertheless continued to publicise the social neglect of the mentally handicapped: she was one of the first in Prussia to do so. There was hardly any residential care provision for those affected. They almost always had to live with their families, who were often helpless when it came to providing necessary support. The hope on the part of Johanne and her brothers that the state would take the affected children into care and provide them with suitable care and education proved to be wishful thinking. Once the Prussian Parliament had declared itself not responsible for such matters, Johanne Nathusius was uncompromising in her reaction. "Faced with the failure of the parliament, it becomes a task for us" ("Versagt der Landtag, dann wird es unsere Aufgabe").

=== Neinstedt ===
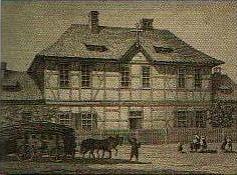
The "original Elisabethstift" from an engraving by C. Ernst Bollmann, 1863...the original buildings of the Elisabethstift have been extensively rebuilt and extended: little of the original half-timbered building is recognisable today.

Philipp von Nathusius and his wife Marie had already opened their Rettungshaus für Knaben "home for orphans and the neglected", in a disused farm house acquired for the purpose at Neinstedt, back in October 1850. There was also an adjacent building, known as the "Lindenhof", which accommodated care staff. Johanne decided to set up her own institution, dedicated to the care of mentally handicapped young boys, in the same little town. After several attempts she acquired a farm house with its own extensive plot of land. This met her requirements and she funded the property purchase from her own pocket. Following appropriate reconstruction and refurbishment the new home for mentally handicapped boys was opened on 3 January 1861. Nathusius was particularly keen that the establishment should not become known simply as "das Blödsinnigenanstalt" (loosely, "the Institution for the Half-witted". She was herself a committed royalist. King Frederick William had died the day before her institution had opened, and she now asked king's Bavarian-born widow, Elisabeth Ludovika (1801–1873), who was known to be deeply committed to charitable causes, for permission to name it after her. The Queen Dowager agreed to the request, with the result that the institution became known not as the "Blödsinnigenanstalt", but as the "Elisabethstift" (loosely, "Elisabeth Foundation"). During its first year of operation the Elisabethstift provided a home for fifteen children. That still quite small building became the starting point for the work on behalf of the mentally handicapped of today's (subsequently renamed) "Neinstedter Anstalten", a privately funded charitable operation which has become one of the Diakonie's largest institutions for the handicapped in Germany. Over the years the original buildings of the Elisabethstift were extensively rebuilt and extended, so that very little of the original half-timbered structure is recognisable today.

Although Johanne's brothers, August, a landowner in Meyendorf, and Philipp, who was already head of the Lindenhof at Neinstedt, were formally identified as the directors of the "Elisabethstift", it was Johanne who through the simple force of her personality controlled and ran it. She also took care of financial administration. After the death of her brother Philipp in 1873 she was appointed a member of the board, even after she relocated the short distance to Althaldensleben in 1876 to look after Philipp's family, she remained firmly in charge at the Elisabethstift.

=== Expansion ===
In 1863 Johanne Nathusius managed to persuade Adolphine von Bonin (1853 - 1916, a friend of the Queen Dowager)) to let her use the Schloss Detzel (near Haldensleben) in connection for her charitable work. The Schloss, which had been built by Adolphine's late father, Hermann von Bonin, in 1844, was subsequently gifted in full. Johanne Nathusius used it to open another establishment in 1864. Now known as the "Pflegeheim Schloss Detzel" ("Care home ....") it was run in tandem with the Elisabethstift, and used for the care of mentally handicapped young girls. The "Asyl Gottessorge" (loosely, "Care of God asylum") was founded in 1865, and also operated as part of the "Elisabethstift" complex. Further expansion came with the purchase and conversion, in 1877, of a disused sugar factory which became the "Blödsinnigenanstalt Kreuzhilfe" near the local spa resort, Thale. Then in 1884 an institution for male epilepsy sufferers, the "Gnadenthal Home" was opened, also in Thale. By the time of her death, in 1885, Johanne Nathusius had created more than 400 care places in Various institutional buildings operated together as the "Elisabethstift". The various establishments remained in her ownership till she died, after which they were taken over by a charitable foundation established for the purpose.

== Philosophy and legacy ==
In the context of the times, Johanne Nathusius was a pioneer. The conventional wisdom held that the mentally handicapped needed to be looked after, but for Nathusius this was a wholly inadequate ambition. Those for whom she cared in her institutions were fully entitled human beings, all loved by God, and care must be given appropriately. This underpinned her insistence on finding individually fulfilling employment opportunities appropriate to each individual's abilities and disabilities. This went along with her insistence on delivering appropriate education opportunities, which would later be implemented in specialised workshops and a specially organised school for the mentally handicapped.

== The artist ==
Johanne Nathusius was also a talented artist. As a young women, starting in 1846, she undertook several trips in Germany, Switzerland and to Italy which enabled her to develop her artistic skills. From 1860, over a number of years she produced 28 oil painted panels, concentrating on plants and flowers, and imbued with etymological symbolism. These were then reproduced in 1868 in a book that she had published by "Verlag Arnold" (publishers) of Leipzig. She also designed learning materials for use by Elisabethstift residents, and large format pictures for the chapel at the "Kreuzhilfe" care home in Thale, and for the dining hall at the Elisabethstift in Neinstedt.
