= Thomas von Nathusius =

German painter (1866–1904)

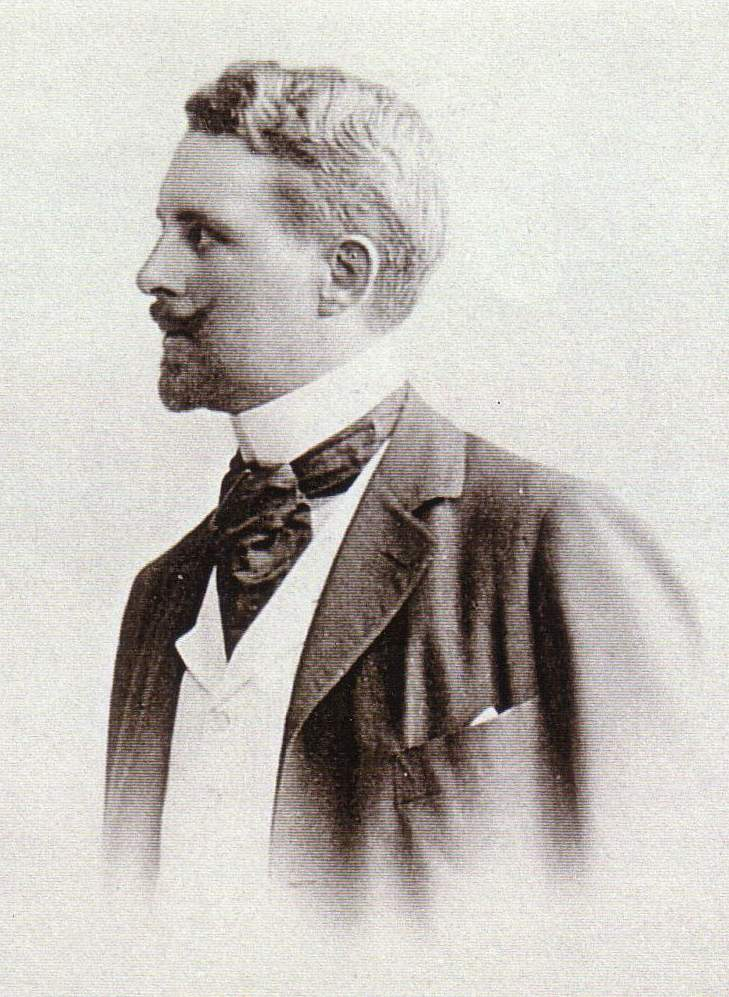
Thomas von Nathusius, c.1890

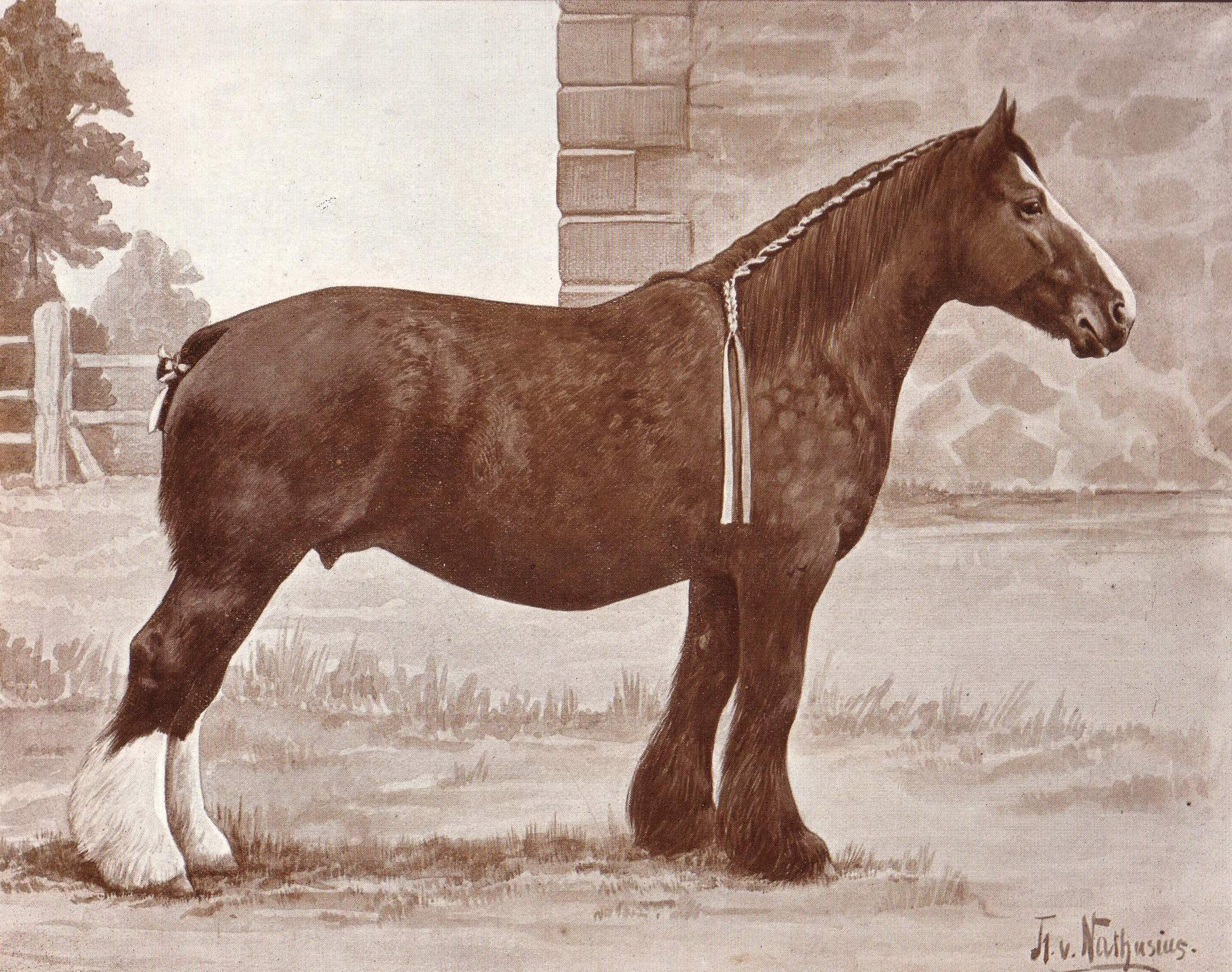
Shire mare "Dunsmore Gloaming", born 1890 in Childwick, England; book illustration after a painting by Thomas von Nathusius

Thomas von Nathusius (Althaldensleben 1866 – Stettin 1904) was a German landscape and animal painter. The youngest son of Heinrich von Nathusius, he was grandson to Johann Gottlob Nathusius, nephew to Hermann von Nathusius and first cousin to the portrait painter Susanne von Nathusius. His paintings of animals were used to illustrate a four-volume atlas of the races and forms of domesticated animals, in collaboration with his brother Simon von Nathusius.

== Works ==
- Atlas der Rassen und Formen unserer Haustiere: Nach Originalzeichnungen von Tiermaler Th. von Nathusius; 1: Die Pferderassen. Stuttgart: Eugen Ulmer 1904
- Atlas der Rassen und Formen unserer Haustiere: Nach Originalzeichnungen von Tiermaler Th. von Nathusius; 2: Die Rinderassen. Stuttgart: Eugen Ulmer 1904
- Atlas der Rassen und Formen unserer Haustiere: Nach Originalzeichnungen von Tiermaler Th. von Nathusius; 3: Die Schweinerassen, die Schafrassen, die Ziegenrassen Stuttgart: Eugen Ulmer 1904
- Atlas der Rassen und Formen unserer Haustiere: Nach Originalzeichnungen von Tiermaler Th. von Nathusius; 4: Verschiedenheiten der Formen, verursacht durch Variabilität, Gebrauchszweck, Aufzucht, Alter, Geschlecht usw. Stuttgart: Eugen Ulmer 1906
