= Elsbeth von Nathusius =

German writer

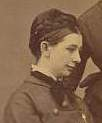
Elsbeth von Nathusius, detail from a photograph ca. 1875

Elsbeth von Nathusius (17 January 1846 - 10 July 1928) was a German story writer.

== Life ==
Elsbeth Luise Friederike von Nathusius was born in Königsborn, a small but prosperous village near Magdeburg in central northern Germany. She was one of six children born to the gentleman-farmer and high-profile oologist Wilhelm von Nathusius (1821-1899) by his marriage to Marie von Meibom (1820–1878). A younger brother, Wilhelm von Nathusius (1856-1937), became an army officer. Her sister, Susanne von Nathusius (1850-1929) became a successful portrait artist in Halle. Elsbeth herself remained unmarried and had no children.

Evidence of Elsbeth charms as a small child comes from the poet and writer of children's songs, August Heinrich Hoffmann von Fallersleben, who visited her father in 1847 and dedicated twelve songs (including "For Elsbeth Nathusius") to the infant in a volume published under the title "The Elsbeth Album". She continued to live at the family home as a young adult and in 1890 relocated with her widowed father to Halle where she remained for two years. Later, in 1912, she moved to Kassel, living initially in a guest house and later with her younger brother, Wilhelm and his English-born wife, and then moving into a "women's residence" in the city's Wilhelmshöhe quarter.

During the 1880s, using the pseudonym F.L.Born, Nathusius published stories in Daheim, a well-regarded fortnightly "Family magazine". Later books appeared under her name, such as "Erinnerungen an Johanne Nathusius" ("Memories of Johanne Nathusius") which concerned her formidable aunt, Johanne Philippine Nathusius. Another was "Johann Gottlob Nathusius. Ein Pionier deutscher Industrie" (... a pioneer of German industry). This time the subject was her grandfather. There were also articles about Philippine Engelhard. her great grandmother.

Her savings were destroyed by the great inflation after which she lived in greatly reduced circumstances. Elsbeth von Nathusius died of Pneumonia in the summer of 1928 at the care home in Merxhausen.

== Output (selection) ==
=== Using a pseudonym in Daheim ===
- Unser Neffe, 8 part series, 1886
- Dorothee, 3 part series (vols 35-37), 1887
- Zum dritten Male, 5 part series (vols 27-31), 1888

=== Using her own name ===
- Alte Märchen. Den Kindern neu erzählt (Old fairy tales retold for children), illustrated by Otto Fikentscher, Gebauer-Schwetschke, Halle/Saale 1903, 1904, 1905, 1906 und 1910
- Erinnerungen an Johanne Nathusius, Gebauer-Schwetschke, Halle/Saale ca. 1905
- Johann Gottlob Nathusius. Ein Pionier deutscher Industrie, Deutsche Verlags-Anstalt, Stuttgart & Berlin ca. 1912
- Philippine Gatterer, in: Hessenland, Nr. 33, 1919
- Philippine Engelhard. Eine deutsche Dichterin aus der guten alten Zeit
