= Annemarie von Nathusius =

German novelist (1874–1926)

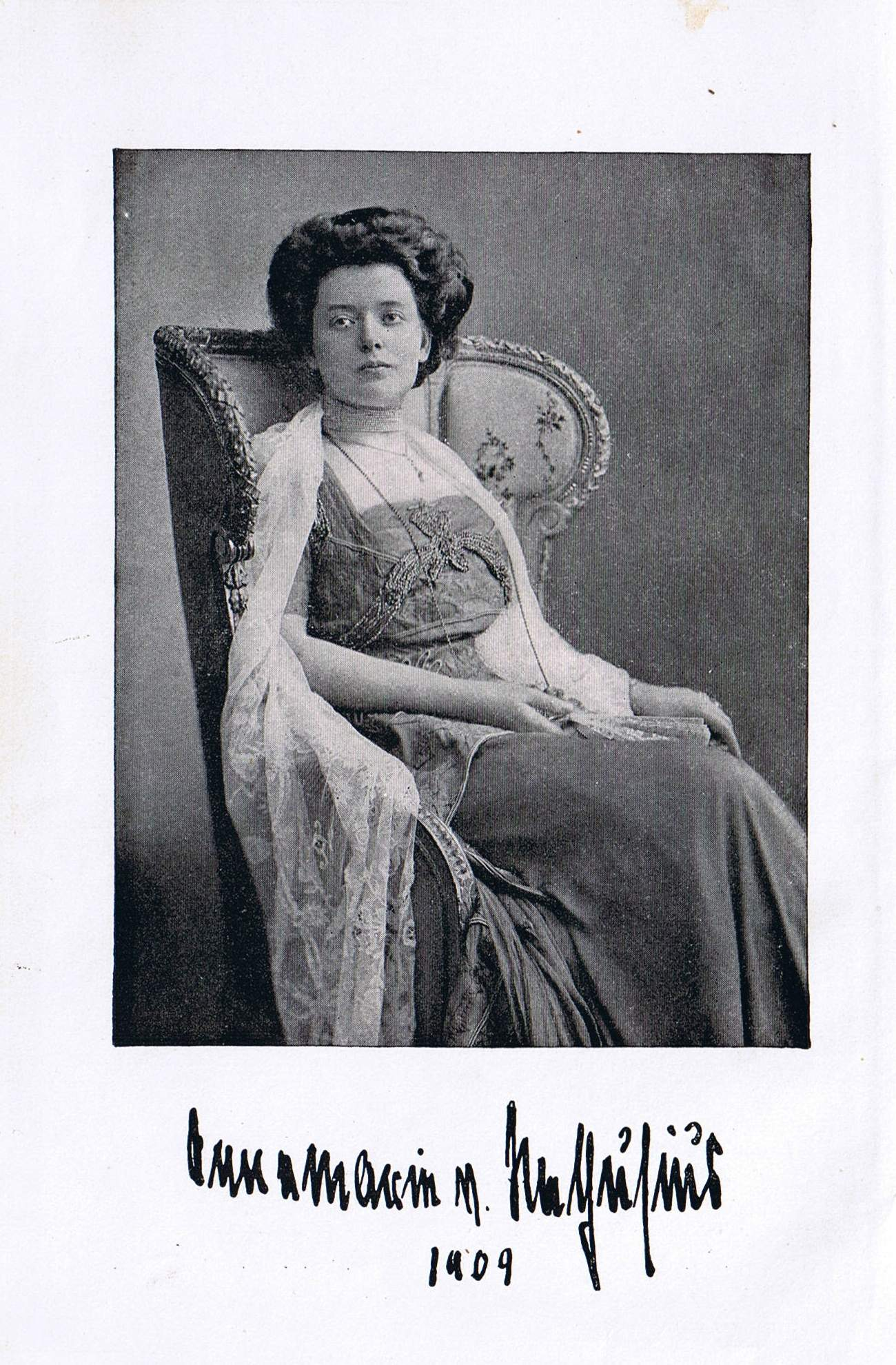
Annemarie von Nathusius, with signature, 1909

Annemarie von Nathusius, originally Anna Maria Luise von Nathusius (28 August 1874, in Ludom/Poznań – 17 October 1926, in Berlin), was a German novelist who wrote boldly about issues of women’s sexuality and lived a distinctly unconventional life. In her books, she criticized the sexual ignorance and exploitative marriages imposed on young women of her class. Her most successful novel was Das törichte Herz der Julie von Voß. The novel Malmaison 1922 was film adapted by Paul Ludwig Stein for the movie Es leuchtet meine Liebe.

== Life ==
The daughter of an often insolvent aristocratic Prussian Junker, editor of the conservative Kreuzzeitung, Philipp von Nathusius, she was left motherless at age 9. Her grandparents were novelist Marie Nathusius and the publisher Philipp von Nathusius; her great-great-grandmother the poet Philippine Engelhard. In 1896 she married the painter Thomas von Nathusius, a first cousin once removed. She lived with him mainly in Berlin, separated from him in 1900, and divorced him in 1904. When she began her writing career in about 1901, her themes derived from the predicament of women in Junker families, particularly their subordination to abusive men. In about 1902 she met Paul Ilg, an aspiring Swiss writer from an impoverished, lower-class background. Using their combined funds, they left Berlin together. Traveling as husband and wife, they stayed on the Riviera, in Northern Italy, and in Munich, their financial situation gradually deteriorating and growing dire. In 1905 Nathusius, probably without Ilg, returned to Berlin. 1916 marked the start of another important relationship, this one a passionate affair with an uneducated young German, Maximilian Kirsch, who had been coerced into joining the French Foreign Legion in Africa and then managed to desert back to Germany. Nathusius wrote short stories and lyrics. First works were published in 1901. Around 1906 Nathusius was introduced to prince Christian Kraft zu Hohenlohe-Öhringen, who became her patron.

In 1910 Der stolze Lumpenkram was published to great success and some controversy. Like several of her other novels, it attacked the lifestyle of Prussian aristocrats and their treatment of women. In 1925, after a trip to Persia she went to Baden-Baden for treatment of her diabetes. On 15 October 1926 she traveled to Berlin where she died two days later.

== Works ==
- Mann und Weib. Geschichten und Gedanken (Man and woman. Stories and thoughts) Richard Eckstein, Nachf. H. Krüger, Berlin (1901),
- Freie Worte! Lieder und Skizzen (Free words! Songs and sketches) Richard Eckstein, Berlin ca. 1902
- Die Glücksucherin (The adventuress) Berliner Illustrierte Zeitung, 1904; Book edition: O. Janke, Berlin 1911. 1921
- Die Herrin auf Bronkow. Eine Gutsgeschichte (The lady of Bronkow. Story of an estate) Otto Janke, Berlin 1905, 1907
- Erika. Erzählung (Erica. Tale) Kürschners Bücherschatz: Roman und Novellensammlung, Nr.548. Hermann Hillger, Berlin und Leipzig 1907
- Heimatklänge. Erzählungen und 16 Gedichte (Sounds of home. Tales and 16 poems) Otto Janke, Berlin 1907
- Das Heidehaus (House on the heath) Webers moderne Bibliothek Nr.126, Otto Weber, Heilbronn a.N.,1908
- Um die Heimat (About the homeland) Deutsche Roman-Zeitung 1908, Nr.48-52; Buchausgabe.Otto Janke, Berlin 0.J.(1909)
- Der stolze Lumpenkram (The proud scraps of rags) Otto Janke, Berlin 1910, 10. Aufl. 1914
- Thekla (Thekla) Deutsches Frauenbuch, Hrsg. von Hermann Beuthenmüller, Franz Moeser Nachf.o.J. Leipzig, Berlin (um 1910), S. 329-343
- Der Herr der Scholle (Lord of the earth) Seyfert, Dresden 1911
- Die Reise nach Baden. Erzählung (The trip to Baden. A tale) Die Woche, Moderne Illustr.Zeitschrift, 13. Jg., Bd. IV, (Heft 40-52), August Scherl, Berlin 1911; book edition: C. Reißner, Dresden-Blasewitz 1912
- Der Schatz von Sevengade.Prinzessin Leonor. 2 Erzählungen (The Sevengade treasure. Princess Leonore. 2 tales) Hermann Hillger, Berlin und Leipzig 1913; Kürschners Bücherschatz Nr.805
- Ich bin das Schwert! (I am the sword!) C. Reissner, Dresden 1914
- Das Haus mit den Rosen (The house with the roses) Hillger, Berlin und Leipzig 1917
- Das törichte Herz der Julie von Voß. Eine Hofgeschichte aus der Zopfzeit, Mit 13 Zeichnungen von Dorothea Hauer (The foolish heart of Julie von Voss. A court story from the time of the rococo wig, with 13 drawings by Dorothea Hauer) Deutsche Verlags-Anstalt, Stuttgart and Berlin 1918
- Schloss Wusterode. Erzählung (Castle Wusterode. Tale) Hausfreund-Bibliothek, Bd.183, Klambt Verlag, Neurode u.a. 1919
- Eros. Roman (Eros, Novel) Deutsches Verlagshaus Bong & Co., Berlin, Leipzig, Wien, Stuttgart 1919
- Jugendträume (Dreams of Youth) Eckstein, Leipzig 1920
- Es leuchtet meine Liebe. Erzählungen (The gleam of my love. Tales) Deutsche Verlags-Anstalt, Stuttgart und Berlin 1921
- Die Unerlösten. Eine Erzählung für Unmoralische (The unredeemed. A tale for the immoral) W. Borngräber, Berlin 1921
- Rheinsberg. Ein märkischer Roman (Rheinsberg. A novel from the Mark [Brandenburg]) Deutsche Verlags-Anstalt, Stuttgart und Berlin 1922
- Im sinkenden Licht. Roman aus den achtziger Jahren (In the declining light. Novel from the eighties.) Ullstein, Berlin 1922
- Der Befreier (The liberator) Schwert-Verlag, Berlin 1923
- Heimat. Novellen (Home. Novellas) Schwert-Verlag, Berlin 1923
- Gräfin Dorothee. Erzählung (Countess Dorothea. Tale) Westermanns Monatshefte,70.Jg.(Sept.1925-August 1926, Bd.140 II, H.839, S. 501-508
- Im Auto durch Persien (By car through Persia), C. Reissner, Dresden 1926
- Im Rosengarten der Königin (In the queen’s rose garden) Illustrierte Kölnische Zeitung,1926(Heft 2,1.09.-Heft 13, 25. November 1926)
- Die Trennung. Roman (The separation. Novel) K.F.Köhler Verlag, Berlin 1927

== Sources ==
- Petra Budke and Jutta Schulze, Schriftstellerinnen in Berlin 1871 - 1945. Ein Lexikon zu Leben und Werk. Der andere Blick. Frauenstudien in Wissenschaft und Kunst, ISBN 3929823225, Orlanda Frauenverlag, Berlin 1995
- Ruth Stummann-Bowert, “Es leuchtet meine Liebe”. Annemarie von Nathusius (1874-1926). Eine adlige Rebellin. Biographie und Werk, ISBN 978-3-8260-4674-2, Königshausen & Neumann, Würzburg 2011
