= Roland (Haldensleben) =

Roland statue

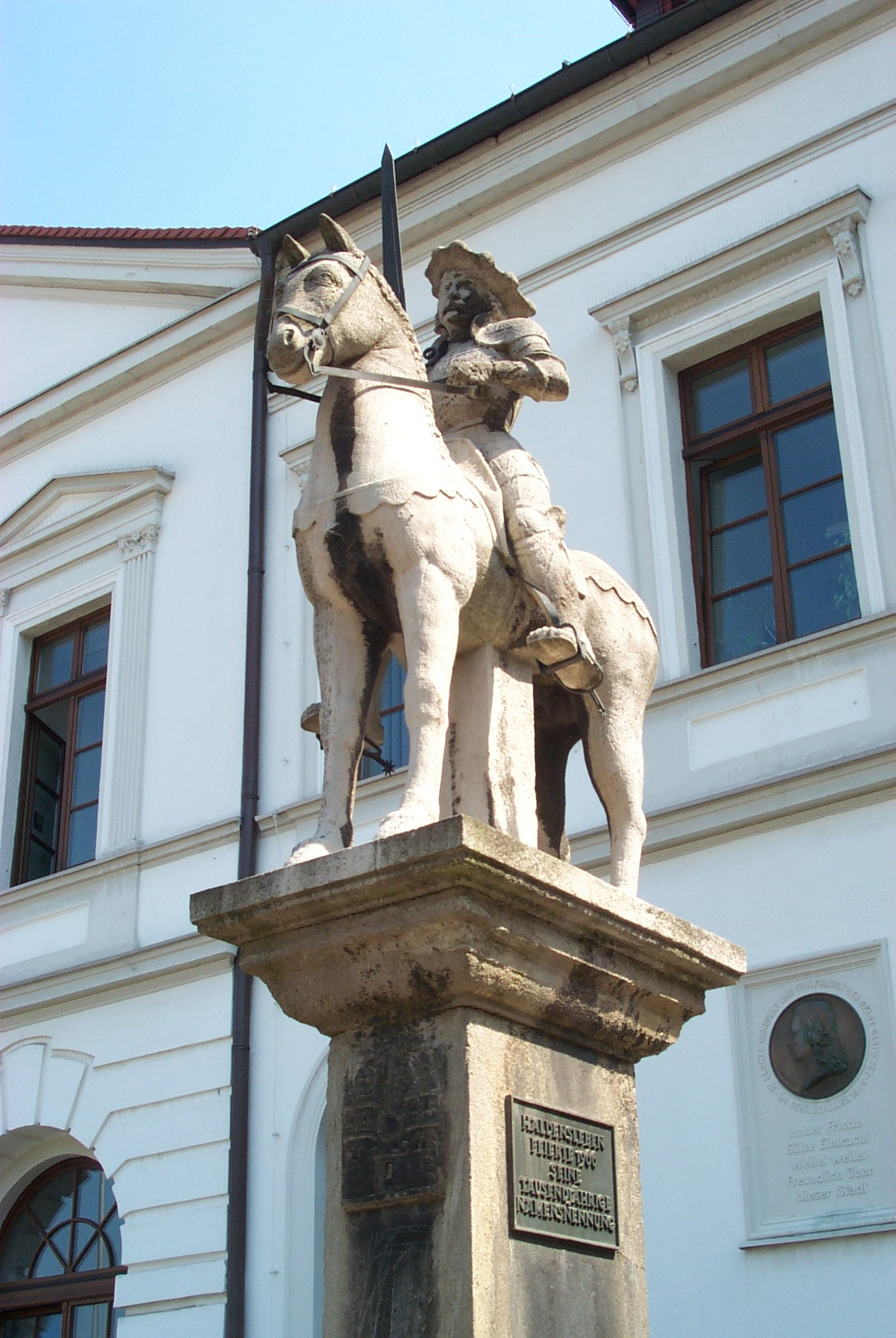
- Haldensleber Roland
- Year: 1528
- Medium: Limestone
- Subject: Roland
- Location: Haldensleben

The Haldensleber Roland is the Roland statue of the city of Haldensleben. The statue is the only one in Europe to show Roland on horseback. It is located in front of the town hall and represents a symbol of urban rights.

In 1419 a standing Roland figure was first mentioned in the city books of Haldensleben. The figure was replaced in 1528 by a stone Roland on horseback. In 1927/28 the statue, damaged by the weather, was replaced by a replica made of limestone from Baden. Since then the original has had its place in the municipal museum.
