= Wilhelm von Nathusius =

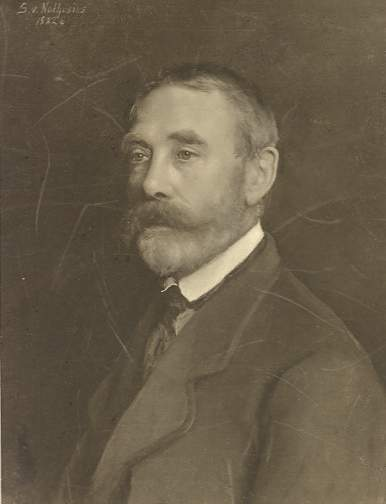
Wilhelm Engelhard von Nathusius (1821–1899)

Wilhelm Engelhard Nathusius (from 1861 Wilhelm von Nathusius-Königsborn) (27 June 1821, Hundisburg – 25 December 1899, Halle ) was a wealthy Prussian land-owning agriculturist, industrialist, animal breeder, and agronomist who also contributed to studies in zoology, particularly on the eggs of birds. An English translation of his work on eggshells was published by Cyril Tyler in 1964.

== Life ==
Wilhelm was the sixth of eight children of the industrialist Johann Gottlob Nathusius and Luise née Engelhard (1787–1875). A maternal great grandfather was the historian Johann Christoph Gatterer. Wilhelm's brothers included Hermann von Nathusius and Heinrich von Nathusius.

=== Childhood and adolescence ===
Nathusius was born in the Hundisburg castle but grew up in the neighboring estate of Althaldensleben where he received private tuition from Julius Carl Elster (1803-1881). His interest in science was kindled by his brother Hermann.

=== Training ===
From the age of 14, he was introduced to his father's earthenware industries where he was given administrative tasks. He was trained by the porcelain expert Alexandre Brongniart. Nathusius studied chemistry in Paris from 1838 under Jean-Baptiste Dumas. After some time in military service in 1840 he began to study in Berlin. He then decided to work in agriculture as porcelain did not appear viable.

=== Königsborn ===
The castle at Königsborn near Magdeburg was bought by Wilhelm's father in 1834 and taken over by Wilhelm after the death of his father in 1843. Wilhelm married Marie Johanne von Meibom in Magdeburg on 6 June 1844. The couple lived in the castle and had six children. Numerous guests visited and stayed with them including the poet August Heinrich Hoffmann von Fallersleben, a friend of Wilhelm who met Marie's friend Elvira Detroit. The couple were known for their piety and charity, and established a school, an orphan home and a shelter for the old.

=== Farmer and breeder ===
Nathusius' estate included about 500 hectares of land. He conducted experiments on different varieties of crops and tested out new farm machinery. He also bred horses and conducted studies on the diseases of livestock.

=== Oologist ===
Nathusius's most influential study was on the shells of bird eggs. He was a collector of bird eggs and published several notes in ornithology journals. His chemical analysis of eggshells, experiments with polarized light and speculations on the structure of eggs were pioneering and bold for his time. His egg collections were donated to the museum in Berlin. He collaborated with the Halle paleontologist Christoph Gottfried Giebel. He compared the shells of molluscs, crustaceans, and those of eggs but he refused to accept the idea of biological evolution and was an avowed "Anti-Darwinist".

=== Public offices ===
Nathusius was influential in agriculture and was a member of various government bodies. He was a member of the Royal Prussian State Economics College from 1852 until 1878. He was a founding member of the German Agricultural Society. For his achievements he was raised to the Prussian nobility on October 18, 1861. He was a member of the Conservative Party and from 1855 to 1859 he was a representative for the district of Jerichow in the Prussian House of Representatives.

Nathusisu died in Halle and was buried in Menz next to his wife who preceded him by 21 years. One of Nathusius' grandsons was Wilhelm Gottlob von Nathusius and a great nephew was Gottlob Karl von Nathusius who also worked in the field of ornithology.
