= Megalithic tombs in Haldensleben Forest =

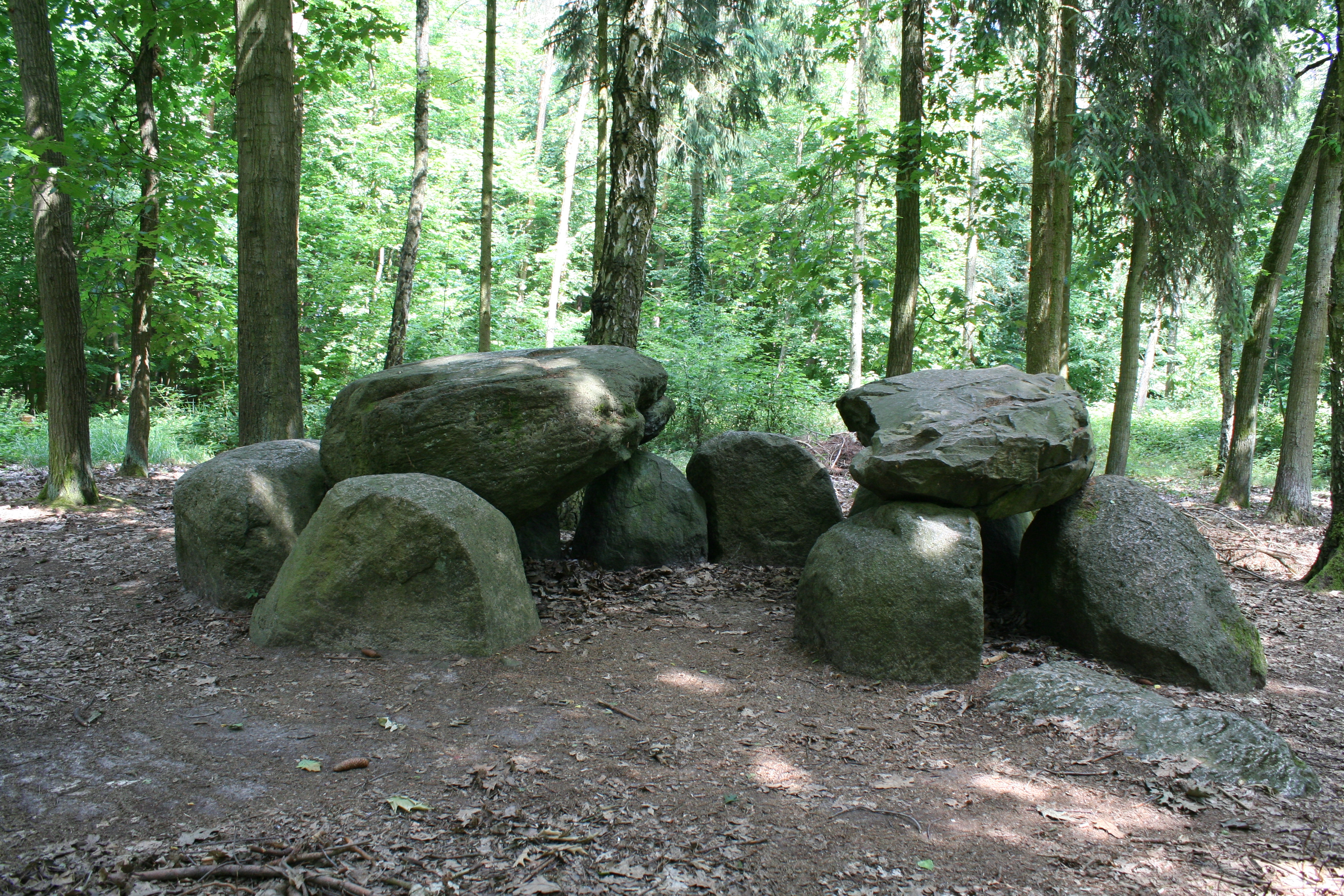
- Teufelsküche ("Devil's Kitchen")

- Location within Germany
- 52°16′30.6″N 11°23′0.9″E
- Periods: Neolithic c. 3500 to 3000 BC
- Location: Haldensleben, Saxony-Anhalt

The Megalithic tombs in Haldensleben Forest are a group of more than 80 megalithic tombs of the Neolithic Age, near Haldensleben, about 22 kilometres (14 mi) north-west of Magdeburg, in Saxony-Anhalt, Germany.

== Description ==
The group of Neolithic graves in the forest south-west of Haldensleben is the largest concentration of megalithic tombs in central Europe. In an area of about 5 by 5 kilometres, there are more than 80 graves, some in good condition. The location of about 50 more graves are known; some have been destroyed, or consist of one stone or loosely scattered stones.

They date from the period 3500 to 3000 BC, and are in recognizable groups. They are mostly passage graves, built from granite boulders. The burial chambers are aligned east–west.

=== Notable graves ===
Three graves are of particular interest:

At the Küchentannen ("kitchen fir trees") at 52°16′17.90″N 11°20′35.44″E there is a reconstructed, enclosed passage grave.

The Kaisergrab ("king's grave") at 52°16′28.70″N 11°20′43.96″E has an almost completely preserved burial chamber and surrounding setting of stones.

The Teufelsküche ("devil's kitchen") at 52°16′30.70″N 11°23′01.80″E has a well-preserved passage grave with two capstones and eight supporting stones.
