= Marie Nathusius =

German novelist and composer (1817–1857)

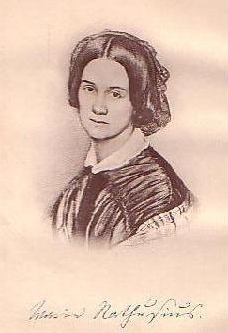
Marie Nathusius

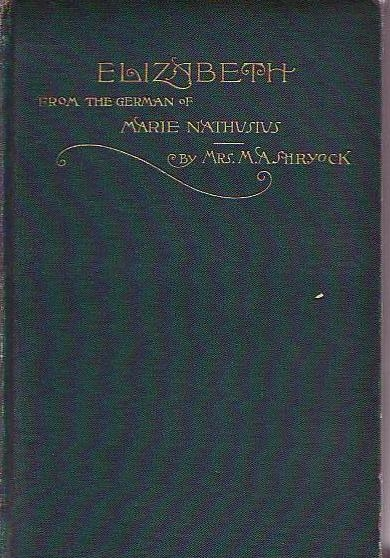
Elizabeth. Translated from the German of Marie Nathusius. By Mrs M A Shyrock, Porter & Coates, Philadelphia, 1891

Marie Nathusius, née Scheele (March 10, 1817, in Magdeburg – December 22, 1857, in Neinstedt) was a German novelist and composer.

== Life ==
Her father was the Calvinist parson Friedrich August Scheele. Marie Nathusius grew up in Calbe (Saale). 1841 she married the publisher Philipp von Nathusius (1815–1872). The couple lived in Althaldensleben and later founded in Neinstedt a charitable organization for the disabled (Neinstedter Anstalten). Nathusius had seven children, including the politician Philipp von Nathusius-Ludom (1842–1900) and the theologian Martin von Nathusius (1843-1906). A granddaughter was the novelist Annemarie von Nathusius (1874–1926).

Nathusius was one of the most-read novelists in the second half of the 19th century in Germany. Her bestsellers Tagebuch eines armen Fräuleins, Langenstein und Boblingen and Elisabeth. Eine Geschichte, die nicht mit der Heirat schließt have been translated and published in several countries.

== Major works ==
- Tagebuch eines armen Fräuleins. Abgedruckt zur Unterhaltung und Belehrung junger Mädchen; 1854
- Joachim von Kamern. Ein Lebenslauf; 1854
- Langenstein und Boblingen; 1855
- Rückerinnerungen aus einem Mädchenleben; 1855
- Die alte Jungfer; 1857
- Elisabeth. Eine Geschichte, die nicht mit der Heirat schließt; 1858
- Die Geschichten von Christfried und Julchen; 1858
- Hundert Lieder, geistlich und weltlich, ernsthaft und fröhlich ...; 1865

=== Translations ===
- Luisa von Plettenhaus. The journal of a poor young lady („Tagebuch eines armen Fräuleins“); T. Constable & Co. (Edinburgh), 1854; C.S. Francis & Co. (New York, Boston), 1857
- Elizabeth. A story which does not end in marriage („Elisabeth“); Simpkin, Marshall & Co. (London); Grant & Son (Edinburgh), 1860
- Step by step. The good first; R. Bentley, London, 1860
- Above her station. A story of a young woman's life, übersetzt von Mrs Herman Philip; Alexander Strahan & Co. (Edinburgh), 1859; Hamilton, Adams & Co. (London), 1859; Follett, Foster & Company (New York), 1863
- Joachim von Kamern/Diary of a poor young lady („Joachim von Kamern“), übersetzt von Miss Thompson; B. Tauchnitz (Leipzig), 1869; Sampson Low, Son & Marston (London), 1869; C. Reinwald (Paris), 1869
- Christfrieds first morning („Christfried“-Serie), aus der Reihe: Little tales for little people, Johnstone, Hunter, Edinburgh, 1870
- Katie von Walden. Langenstein and Boblingen („Langenstein und Boblingen“), übersetzt von Mary A. Robinson; American Sunday School Union, 8 & 10 Bills House, New York, 1892
