= Süplingen =

- Ortsteil of Haldensleben
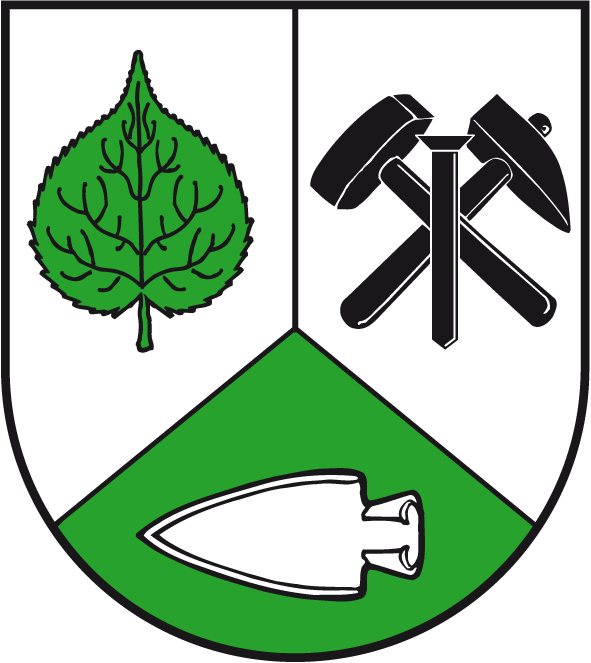
- Coat of arms
- Interactive map of Süplingen
- Location within Germany Location within Saxony-Anhalt
- Coordinates: 52°17′N 11°19′E
- Country: Germany
- State: Saxony-Anhalt
- District: Börde
- Town: Haldensleben

Area
  - Total: 18.33 km^{2} (7.08 sq mi)
- Elevation: 108 m (354 ft)

Population (2012-12-31)
  - Total: 925
  - Density: 50.5/km^{2} (131/sq mi)
- Time zone: UTC+01:00 (CET)
  - Summer (DST): UTC+02:00 (CEST)
- Postal codes: 39343
- Dialling codes: 039053
- Vehicle registration: BK
- Website: www.sueplingen.de

Süplingen is a village and a former municipality in the Börde district in Saxony-Anhalt, Germany. Since 1 January 2014, it is part of the town Haldensleben.
