= Hundsburg (Hessenwald) =

Hill in Hesse, Germany

Coordinates: 51°04′N 9°13′E

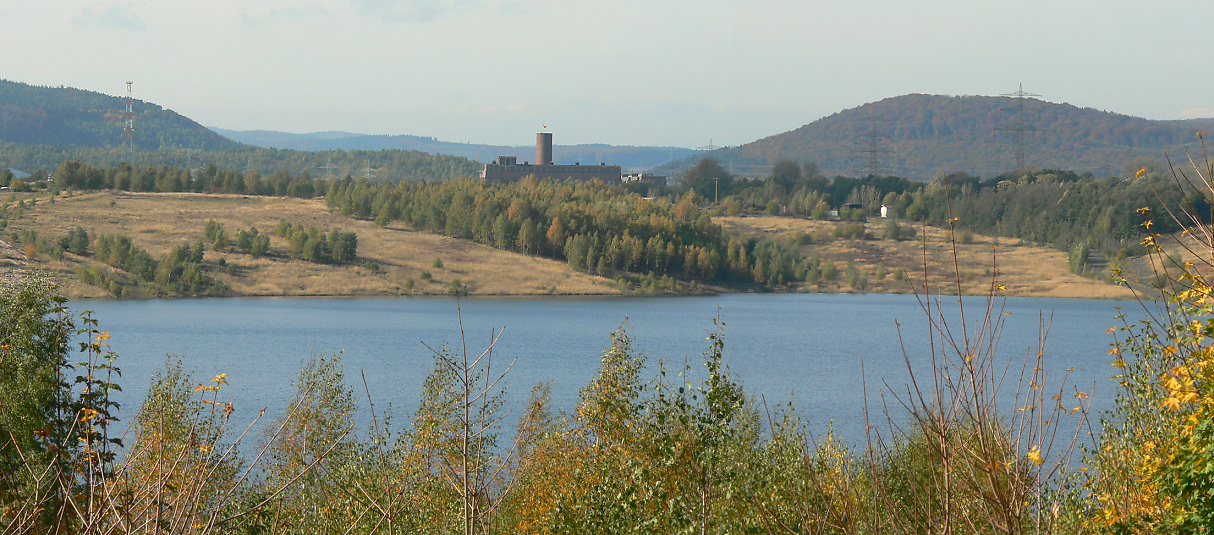
- Hundsburg

Highest point
- Elevation: 334 m (1,096 ft)

Geography
- Location: Schwalm-Eder-Kreis, Hesse, Germany

Hundsburg is a hill in the county of Schwalm-Eder-Kreis, Hesse, Germany.
