= Philipp von Nathusius =

German publisher (1815–1872)

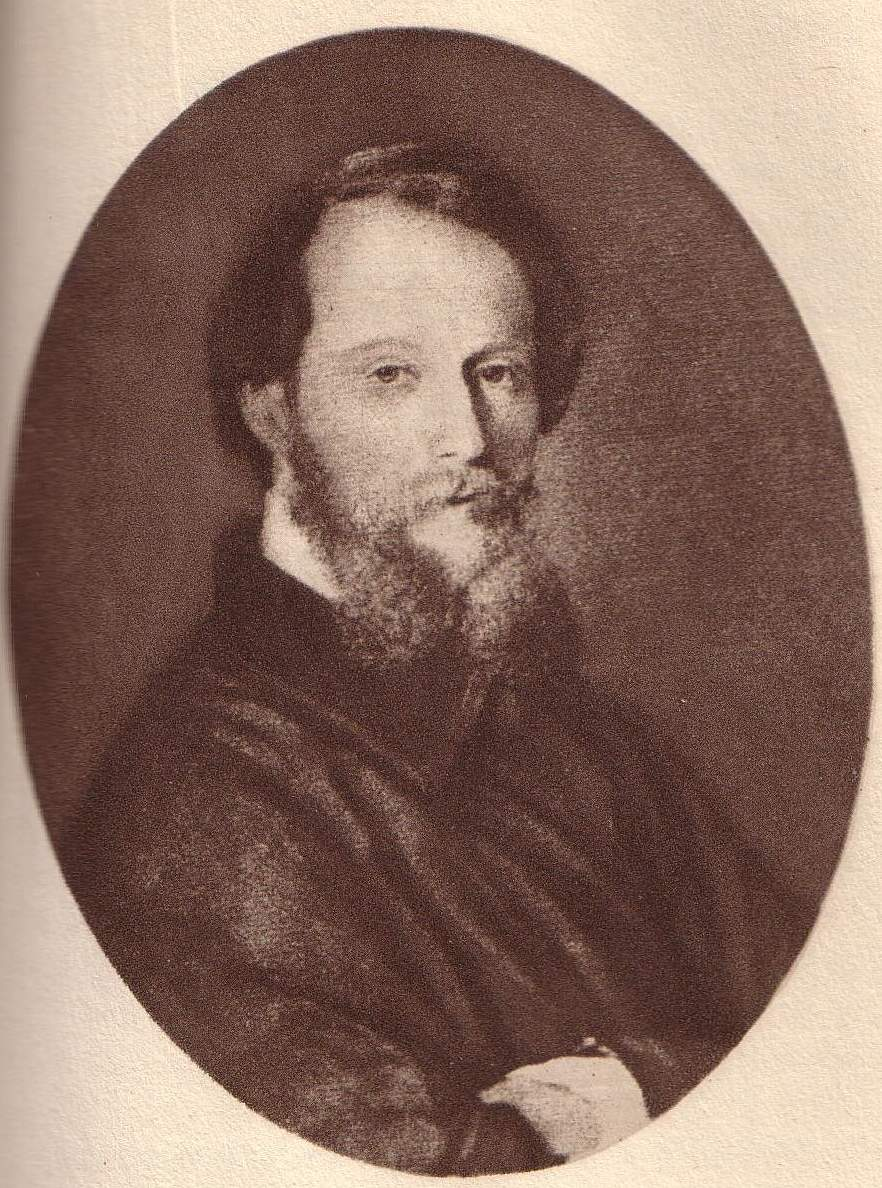
Philipp Engelhard von Nathusius (1815–1872), Porträt from ar 1855, in: Bettina von Arnim: Julius Pamphilius und die Ambrosia

Philipp Engelhard Nathusius, since 1861: von Nathusius (November 5, 1815 in Althaldensleben – August 16, 1872 in Luzern) was a German publisher and founder of a charitable organization in Neinstedt.

== Life ==
He was a son of the industrialist Johann Gottlob Nathusius. One of his brothers was Hermann von Nathusius. Nathusius grew up at the family estate in Althaldensleben. In 1832, he started to work in the Nathusius-porcelain factory. Already as young man he was very interested in literature (his grandmother was the poet Philippine Engelhard). In 1836, he met Bettina von Arnim in Berlin; he stayed in contact with her for several years. She made him the main character in her novel Ilius Pamphilius und die Ambrosia.

In 1841, he married Marie Scheele, later a well known novelist. In 1847, the couple established a charity home for orphans in Althaldensleben. Later, he established a much bigger charitable organization in Neinstedt (today known as the "Neinstedter Anstalten"). In 1849, Nathusius became the editor-in-chief of the Volksblatt für Stadt und Land zur Belehrung und Unterhaltung. From 1861, he was the publisher of the weekly newspaper. Ten years, later his son, Martin von Nathusius, became his successor. His other son was the politician Philipp von Nathusius, and a granddaughter the novelist Annemarie von Nathusius. In 1861, Nathusius was ennobled, and after several years illness, he died in 1872 during a convalescence in Switzerland.

== Works ==
- Fünfzig Gedichte, 1839
- Ulrich von Hutten. Volksthümliche Betrachtungen des gegenwärtigen kirchlichen Streites in Deutschland, 1839
- Noch fünfzig Gedichte, 1841
- Lebensbild der heimgegangenen Marie Nathusius, geb. Scheele, 3 Bände, 1868/69
- Dokumente und Umstände einer nicht zustandegekommenen Claudius-Biographie
