= Susanne von Nathusius =

German painter (1850–1929)

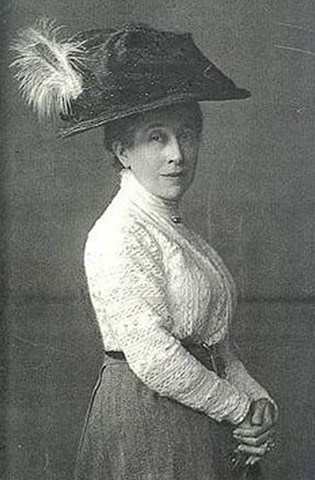
Susanne von Nathusius, c.1910

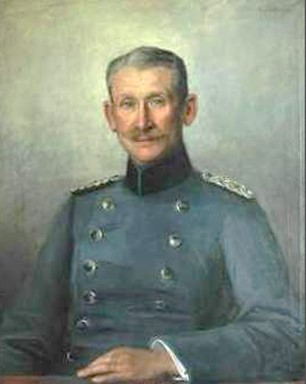
Portrait of her brother, Major General Wilhelm Engelhard von Nathusius

Susanne Philippine von Nathusius (2 May 1850 – 30 December 1929) was a German portrait painter who worked in Halle and Paris.

== Biography ==
She was the third of six children born to the biologist Wilhelm von Nathusius and his wife, Marie and grew up in the family manor at Königsborn, where she received her education from tutors. Later, she studied at the Royal School of Art in Berlin under Gottlieb Biermann. She also took lessons with Karl Stauffer-Bern and received support from Julius Jacob the Younger. She was a friend and regular guest of the sculptor brothers Karl and Reinhold Begas.

She continued her studies in Paris at the Académie Julian, where her teachers included Jean-Paul Laurens, Emile Auguste Carolus-Duran and Jean Jacques Henner. Upon completing her studies, she worked as a portrait painter in Berlin; exhibiting there and in Paris. Eventually, though, she decided to establish herself in Halle.

In 1880, she held her first major exhibition at the Prussian Academy of Arts. In 1891, she took part in an exhibition organized by the Verein Berliner Künstler on the occasion of their fiftieth anniversary. In 1893, one of her paintings was shown in the Woman's Building at the World’s Columbian Exposition in Chicago. That same year, she began participating in the Paris Salon, where she won a silver medal for her portrayal of a Thuringian shoemaker smoking his pipe.

At the beginning of World War I, she had to abandon her studio in Paris. During the war, she remained in Halle, where she became involved in the "National Women's Work" program; establishing a sewing room that offered employment opportunities for military wives and widows.

Among her best-known works are a series of portraits of Professors at the University of Halle and several military figures, including Gottlieb Graf von Haeseler and her younger brother, Wilhelm.

She died after a long stay at a nursing home in Nietleben. She was originally buried near Magdeburg but, when the cemetery there was closed, she was transferred to the family plot in Althaldensleben.
