= Johann Gottlob Nathusius =

German industrialist (1760–1835)

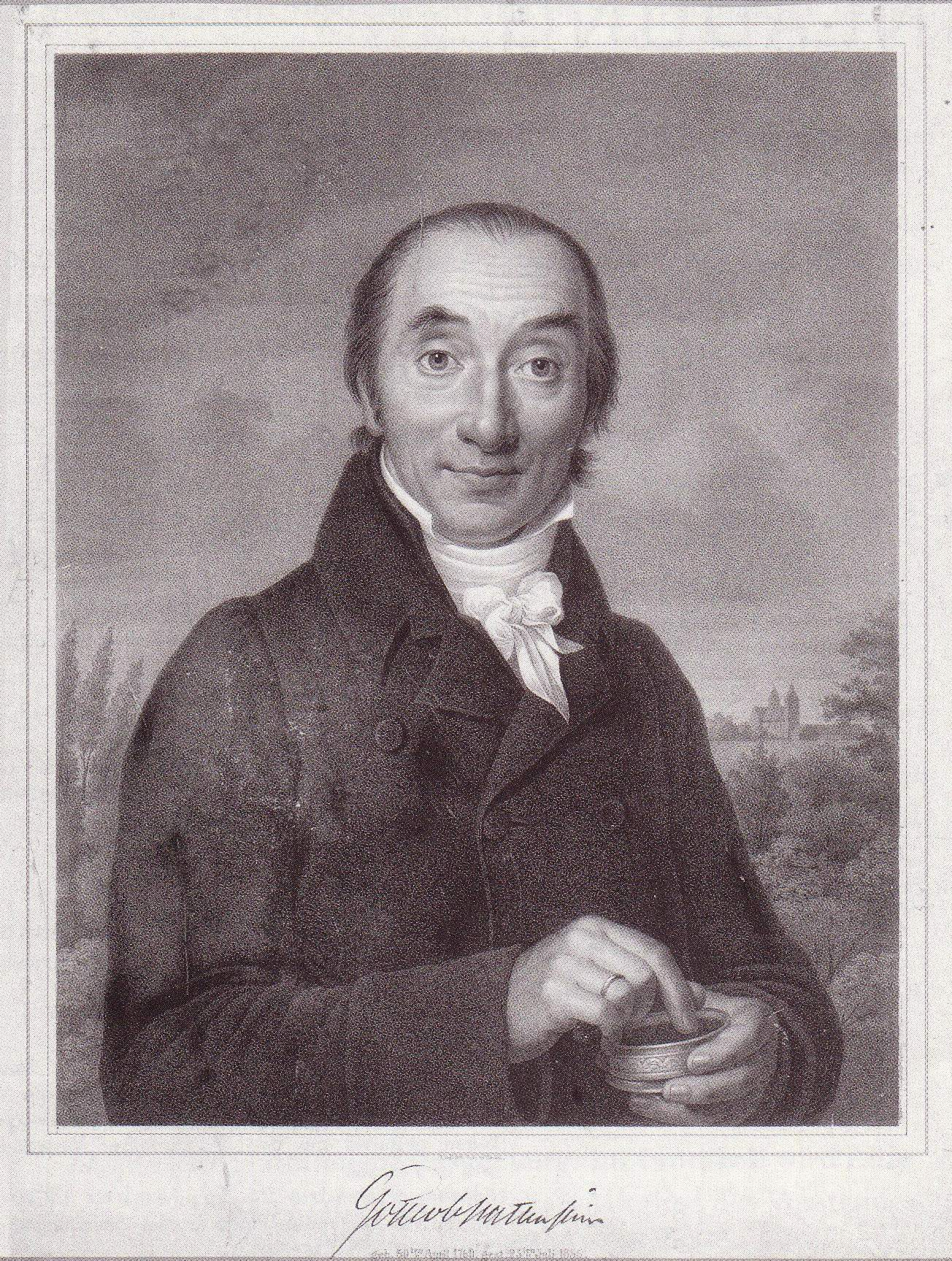
Johann Gottlob Nathusius

Johann Gottlob Nathusius (April 30, 1760 – July 23, 1835) was a German industrialist.

Nathusius was born in Baruth, and learned the trade of a merchant in Berlin, later joining the trading company Sengewald in Magdeburg. After the death of the company's owner he took over the business, which prospered under his management, particularly with the establishment of a tobacco factory (Richter & Nathusius) in 1787 together with his partner Richter; after the death of this partner and the partner's widow, he became its full owner. After the reestablishment of a royal tobacco monopoly, he became a royal factory manager; however under Frederick William III he again regained complete control. The decline in the economy under the Kingdom of Westphalia enabled him to purchase the Althaldensleben monastery and Schloss Hundisburg, and on these estates he developed a comprehensive set of industries, including breweries, flour mills, a sugar factory, a brickyard, a machinery production and a stoneware and porcelain factory.

When Nathusius was 48, he married 18-year-old Luise Engelhard.

He died in Althaldensleben. Two sons of his, Hermann von Nathusius and Wilhelm von Nathusius were noted animal breeders and contributed to agricultural research. Another child was the publisher Philipp von Nathusius. His daughter Luise married the botanist and conchologist Dr. Louis Pfeiffer.
