= Haldensleben =

- Town
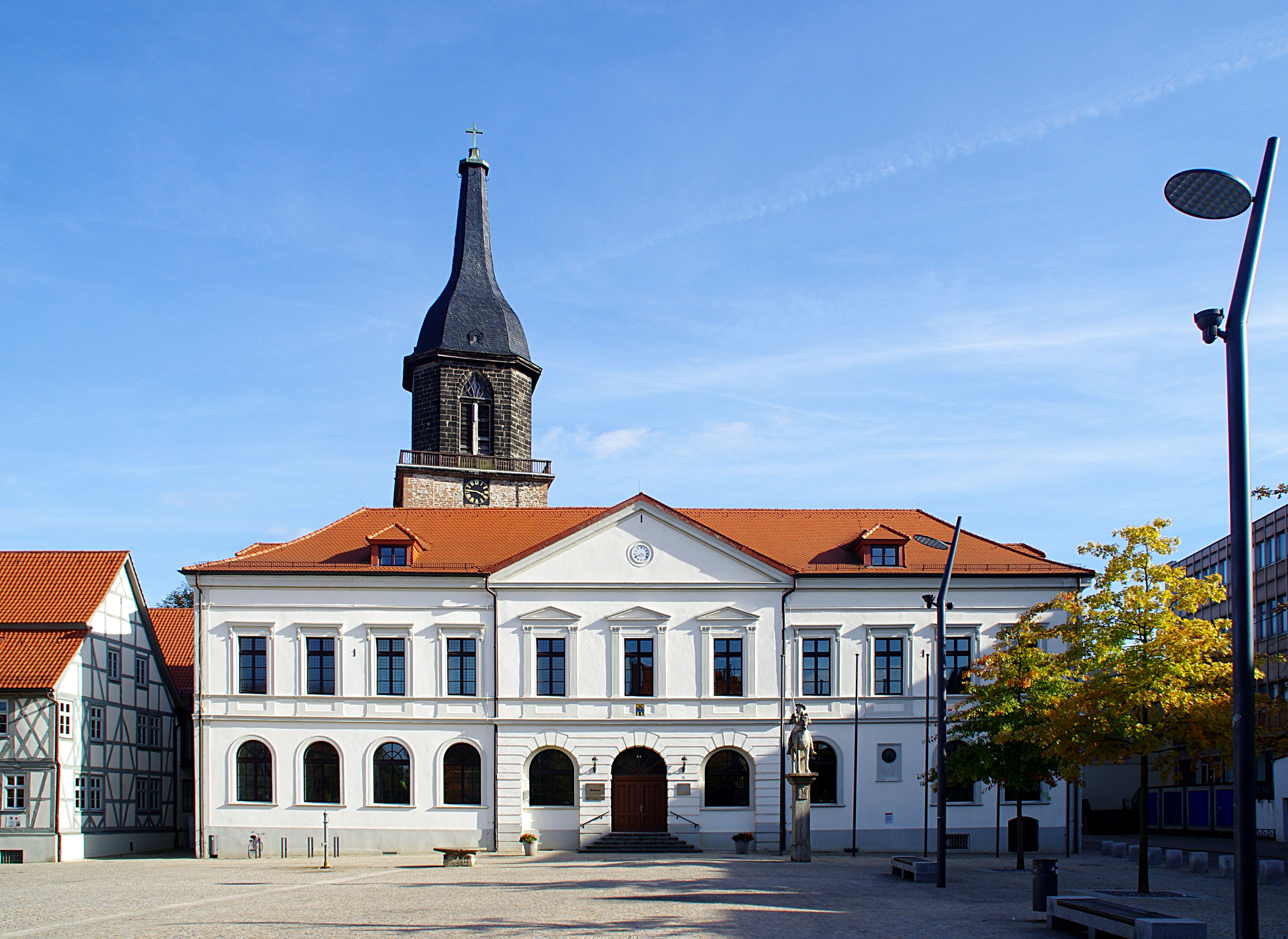
- Market place with town hall and Roland statue

- Coat of arms

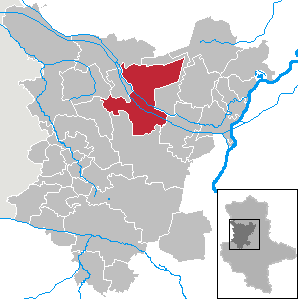
- Location of Haldensleben within Börde district
- Interactive map of Haldensleben
- Location within Germany Location within Saxony-Anhalt
- Coordinates: 52°17′N 11°25′E
- Country: Germany
- State: Saxony-Anhalt
- District: Börde

Government
  - Mayor (2022–29): Bernhard Hieber (SPD)

Area
  - Total: 156.21 km^{2} (60.31 sq mi)
- Elevation: 54 m (177 ft)

Population (2025-12-31)
  - Total: 19,170
  - Density: 122.7/km^{2} (317.8/sq mi)
- Time zone: UTC+01:00 (CET)
  - Summer (DST): UTC+02:00 (CEST)
- Postal codes: 39340
- Dialling codes: 03904
- Vehicle registration: BK
- Website: www.stadt-haldensleben.de

Haldensleben (German pronunciation: [ˈhaldn̩sˌleːbm̩]; Eastphalian: Halslä) is a town in Saxony-Anhalt, Germany. It is the administrative seat of the Börde district.

== Geography ==
It is situated on the Ohre river, near the confluence with its Beber tributary, and the parallel Mittelland Canal, running from the fertile Magdeburg Börde basin to the Elbe river in the east. The town centre is located approximately 30 kilometres (19 miles) northwest from Magdeburg. It is connected by railway to the neighbouring towns of Magdeburg, Oebisfelde and Eilsleben.

The municipal area includes the village of Süplingen, incorporated in 2014.

== Prehistory ==
In Haldensleben Forest, south-west of the town, is a group of more than 80 megalithic tombs of the Neolithic Age, the largest such group in central Europe.

== History ==
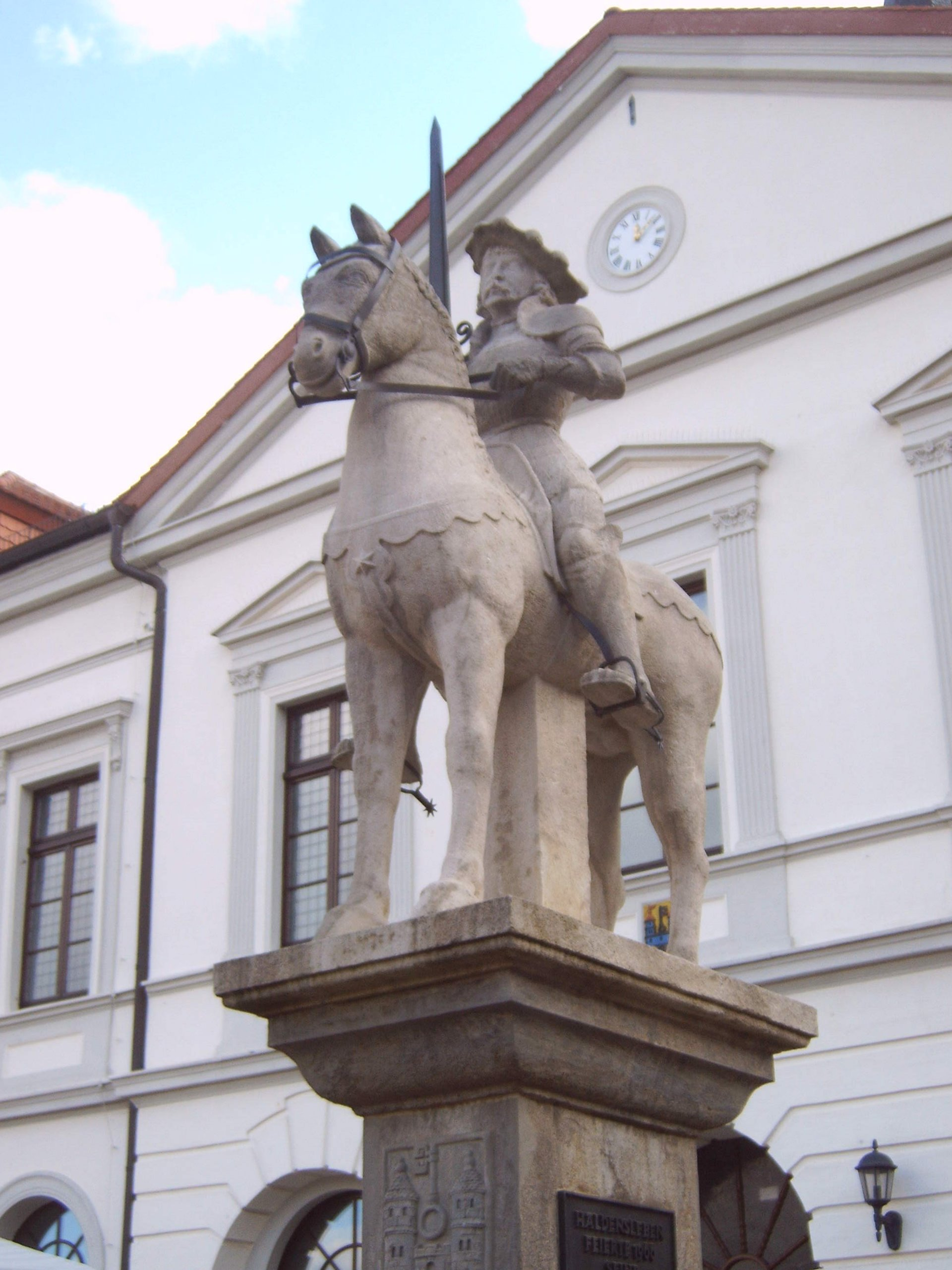
Haldensleben Roland

The Saxon fortress of hahaldeslevo in Eastphalia was first mentioned in a 966 deed of donation issued by Emperor Otto I. The Counts of Haldensleben rose to considerable power, most notably Dietrich and William, who ruled as margraves of the Northern March. Soon after a trading place (Neuhaldensleben) arose nearby, which was vested with market rights about 1150. Besieged and devastetd by the forces of Archbishop Wichmann in 1181, the Haldensleben estates belonged to the Prince-Archbishopric of Magdeburg from 1215.

Rebuilding of the town began in 1223, and Archbishop Albert I established a Cistercian abbey at Althaldensleben. The citizens again received market rights in 1526. The Protestant Reformation was implemented in 1541 and in 1680 the former episcopal lands were secularized as the Duchy of Magdeburg, held by the Hohenzollern rulers of Brandenburg-Prussia.

Nearby Hundisburg Castle was owned by the House of Alvensleben from 1452 until 1811, enlarged in baroque style, with formal gardens, by Hermann Korb from 1693 on the order of Johann Friedrich II. von Alvensleben (1657–1728), a Hanoverian minister of George I of Great Britain. It was partly destroyed by fire in 1945 and reconstructed since 1994.

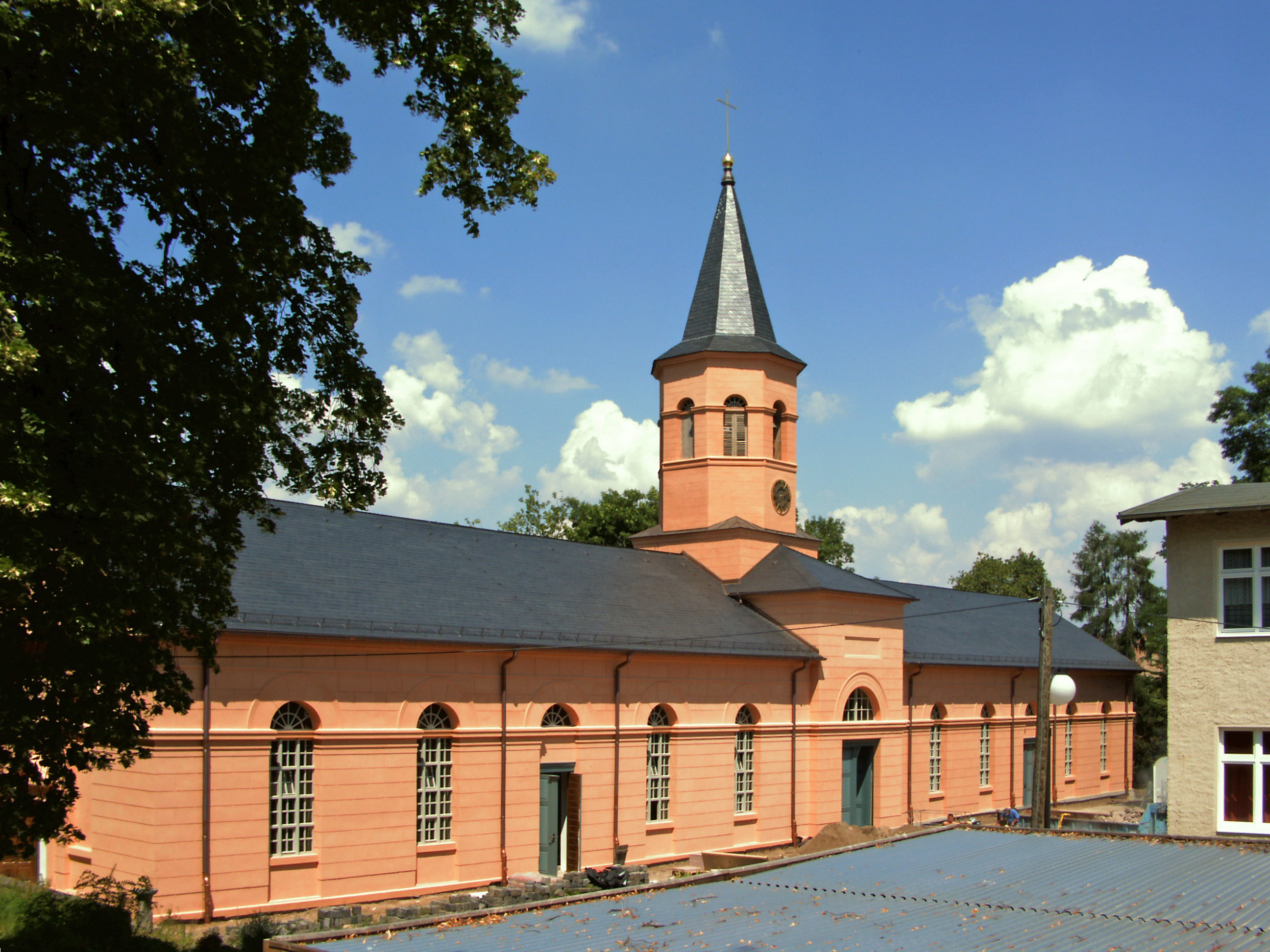
Althaldensleben Simultaneum

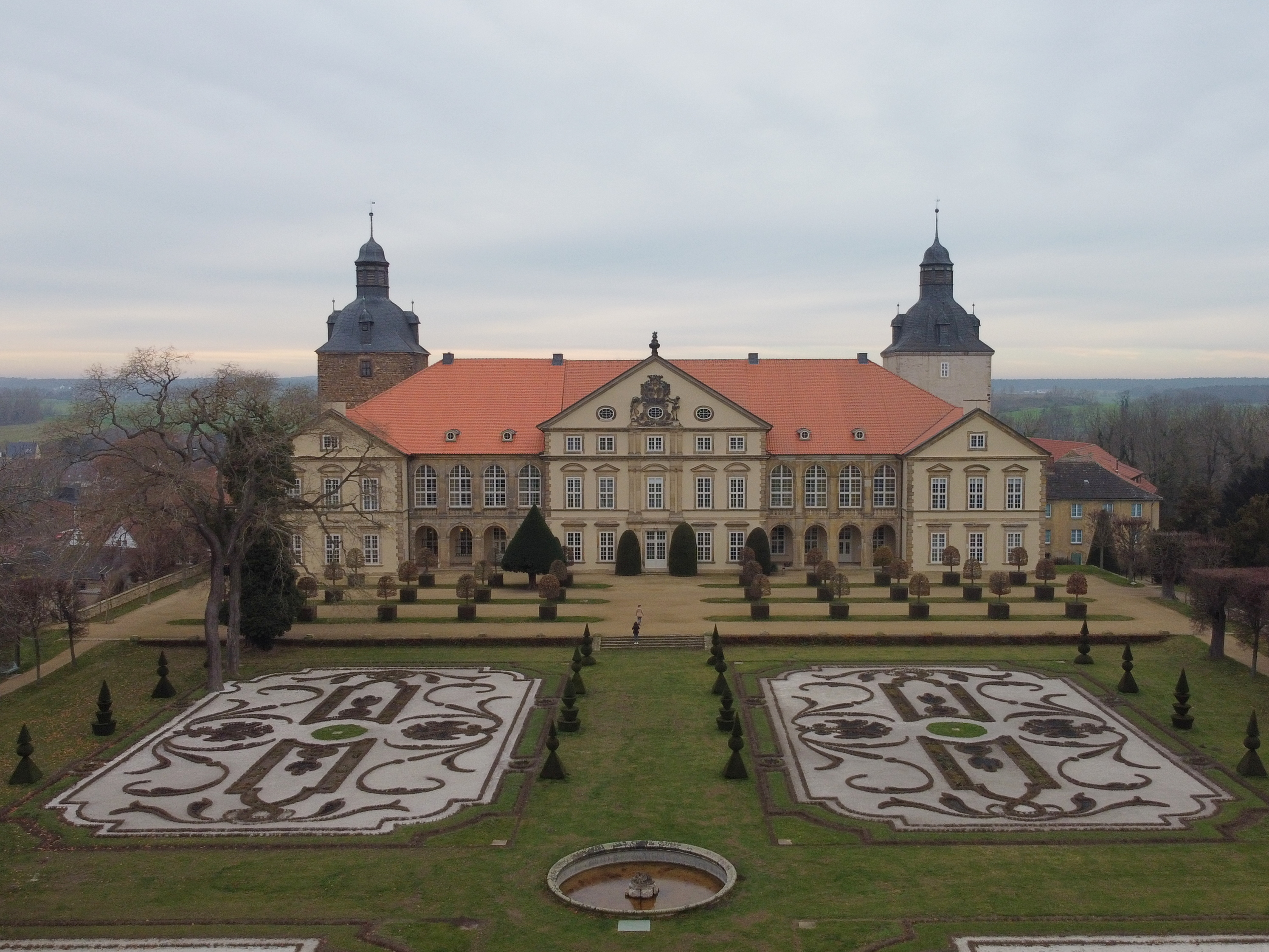
Hundisburg Castle

Today Haldensleben has a Protestant and a Catholic church. An old equestrian statue of Roland symbolized the rights of a medieval settlement to be accepted as a town. It is the only statue of Roland sitting on a horse in the world. Before 1938, when it merged with Althaldensleben, the town was called Neuhaldensleben.

== International relations ==
Haldensleben is twinned with:

- Helmstedt, Germany (since 1990)
- Ciechanów, Poland (since 1992)
  - Viernheim, Germany (since 1992)

== Notable people ==
- Heiko Bonan (born 1966), footballer
- Reinhard Höppner (1948–2014), politician
- Kevin Schlitte (born 1981), footballer
- Heinrich Schnee (1871–1949), lawyer and colonial civil servant
- Reinhild Solf (1941–2022), stage and television actress
- Friedrich von der Trenck (1726–1794), officer, adventurer, and author
- Philipp von Nathusius (1815–1872), publisher
