= Hermann von Nathusius =

German zoologist and animal breeder (1809–1879)

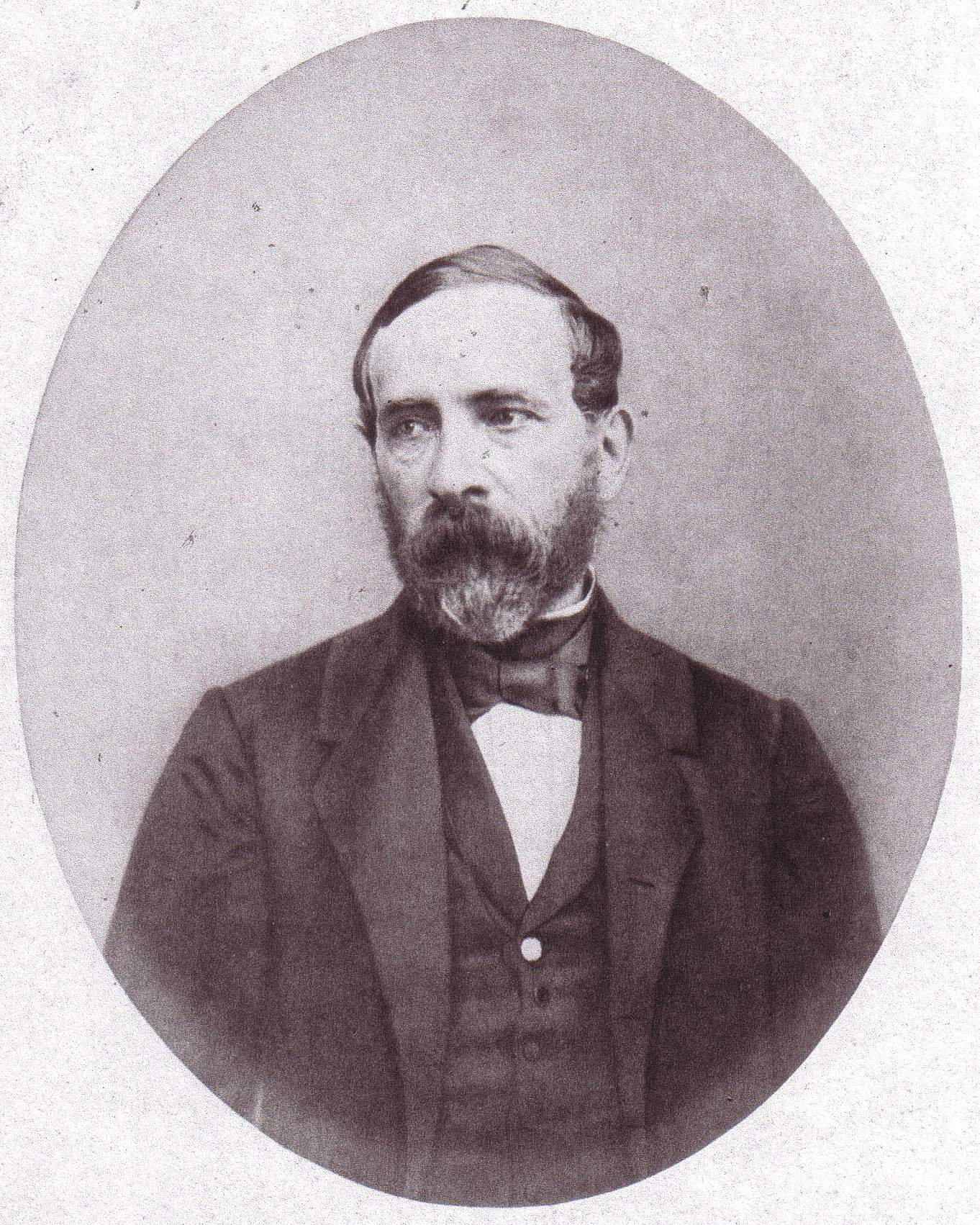
Hermann von Nathusius, c. 1860

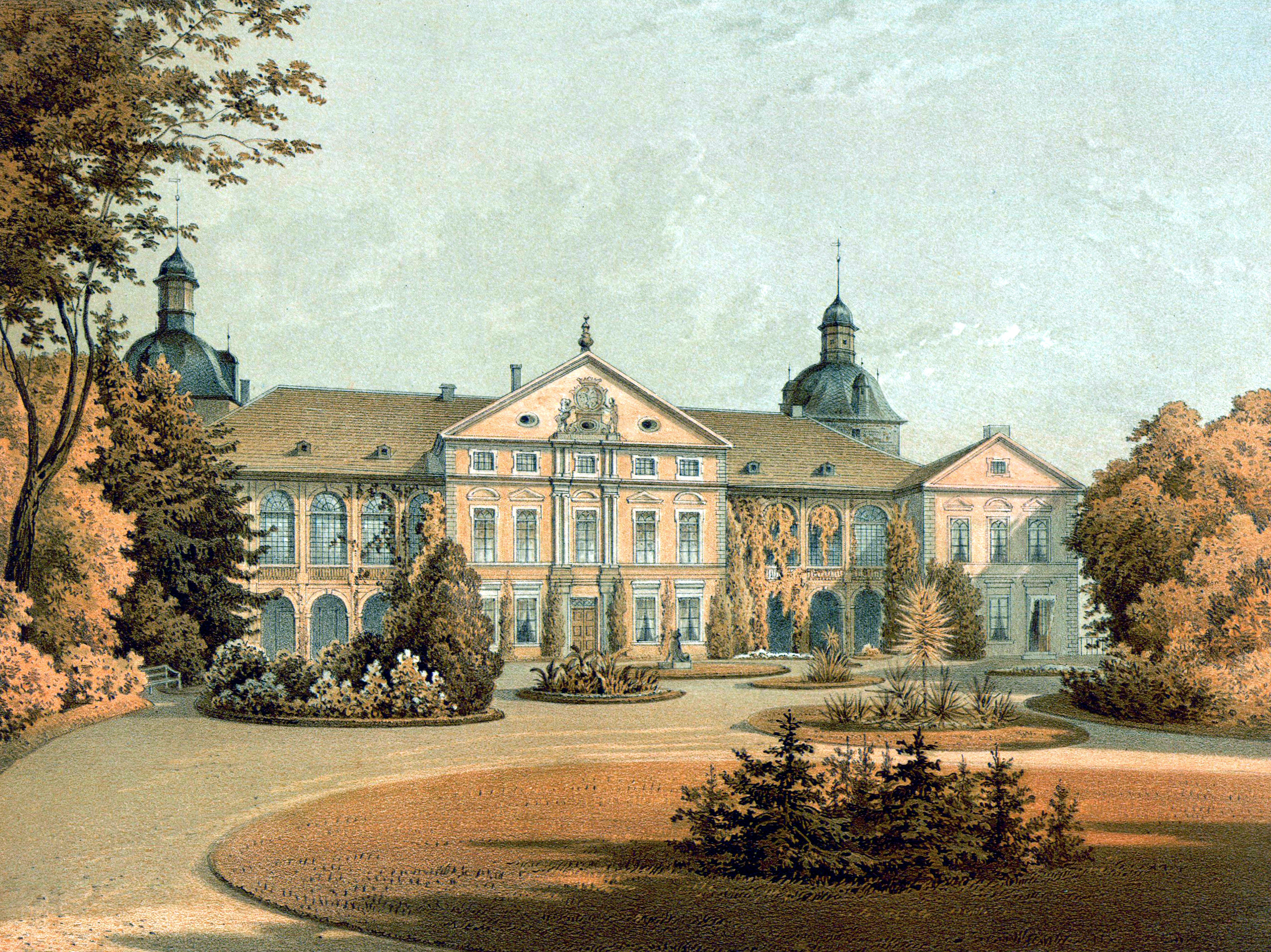
Hundisburg castle c. 1860

Hermann Engelhard von Nathusius (9 December 1809 – 29 June 1879) was a German animal breeder.

Born in Magdeburg to industrialist Johann Gottlob Nathusius, Hermann von Nathusius studied the natural sciences. He took over Schloss Hundisburg from his father and turned it to agriculture, particularly cattle breeding. He introduced cattle breeds from England to Germany, and worked to promote the study of cattle breeding. He collected a large amount of information on his herds, whose breeding he personally oversaw, and amassed a collection of domesticated animal skeletons; his writings became an important reference for the scientific treatment of animal breeding. He was opposed to his contemporary Charles Darwin's theory of evolution, but data from his careful study of breeds was nonetheless used as support for that theory.

He was a member of the Prussian Landesökonomiekollegium (Land Economic Council), director of the province of Saxony's Landwirtschaftlicher Zentralverein (Central Agricultural Council), and president of the Deutsche Ackerbaugesellschaft (German Agricultural Society), among other positions.

From the German Society for Züchtungskunde e. V. (DGfZ) was the Hermann-von-Nathusius-Medaille donated in his honor in 1928.

== Selected works ==
- Ansichten und Erfahrungen über die Zucht von Fleischschafen (1856)
- Über die Konstanz in der Tierzucht (1860)
- Die Rassen des Schweins (1860)
- Über Shorthorn-Rindvieh (1861)
- Vorstudien für Geschichte und Zucht der Haustiere (1864; Partly reprinted in the journal "Elemente der Naturwissenschaft" No. 85, 2006)
- Deutsches Gestütalbum (1868–70)
- Wandtafeln für den naturwissenschaftlichen Unterricht (1871–73)
- Vorträge über Viehzucht und Rassenkenntnis (1872–80)
- Über die sogenannten Leporiden (1876; digital edition)

== Sources ==
- "Nathusius". Meyers Konversations-Lexikon (in German). Vol. 12 (4th ed.). 1890. p. 1.
