= List of Padma Bhushan award recipients (1954–1959) =

List of recipients of a civilian award in India

Padma Bhushan
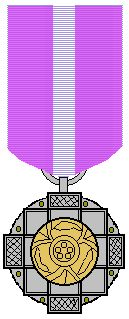
- Type: National Civilian
- Country: India
- Presented by: Government of India
- Ribbon
- Obverse: A centrally located lotus flower is embossed and the text "Padma" written in Devanagari script is placed above and the text "Bhushan" is placed below the lotus.
- Reverse: A platinum State Emblem of India placed in the centre with the national motto of India, "Satyameva Jayate" (Truth alone triumphs) in Devanagari Script
- Established: 1954
- First award: 1954

Highlights
- Total: 94
- Website: http://www.padmaawards.gov.in/

Precedence
- Next (higher): Padma Vibhushan

- Next (lower): Padma Shri

The Padma Bhushan is the third-highest civilian award of the Republic of India. Instituted on 2 January 1954, the award is given for "distinguished service of a high order", without distinction of race, occupation, position, or sex. The recipients receive a Sanad, a certificate signed by the President of India and a circular-shaped medallion with no monetary association. The recipients are announced every year on Republic Day (26 January) and registered in The Gazette of India—a publication used for official government notices and released weekly by the Department of Publication, under the Ministry of Urban Development. The conferral of the award is not considered official without its publication in the Gazette. The name of recipient, whose award have been revoked or restored, both of which require the authority of the President, is archived and they are required to surrender their medal when their name is struck from the register; none of the conferments of Padma Bhushan during 1954–1959 have been revoked or restored. The recommendations are received from all the state and the union territory governments, as well as from Ministries of the Government of India, the Bharat Ratna and the Padma Vibhushan awardees, the Institutes of Excellence, the Ministers, the Chief Ministers and the Governors of State, and the Members of Parliament including private individuals.

When instituted in 1954, the Padma Bhushan was classified as "Dusra Varg" (Class II) under the three-tier Padma Vibhushan awards, which were preceded by the Bharat Ratna in hierarchy. The original specification of the award was a circle made of standard silver 1 3/8 inches (35 mm) in diameter, with rims on both the sides. A centrally located lotus flower was embossed on the obverse side of the medal and the text "Padma Vibhushan" written in Devanagari script was inscribed above the lotus along the upper edge of the medal. A floral wreath was embossed along the lower edge and a lotus wreath at the top along the upper edge. The State Emblem of India was placed in the centre of the reverse side with the text "Desh Seva" in Devanagari Script on the lower edge. The medal was suspended by a pink riband 1 1/4 inches (32 mm) in width divided into three equal segments by two white vertical lines.

On 15 January 1955, the Padma Vibhushan was reclassified into three different awards; the Padma Vibhushan, the highest of the three, followed by the Padma Bhushan and the Padma Shri. The criteria includes "distinguished service of a high order in any field including service rendered by Government servants" but excluding those working with the Public sector undertakings with the exception of doctors and scientists. The 1954 statutes did not allow posthumous awards but this was subsequently modified in the January 1955 statute. The design was also modified to the form that is currently in use. The current design is a circular-shaped toned bronze medallion 1 3/4 inches (44 mm) in diameter and 1/8 inch (3.2 mm) thick. The centrally placed pattern made of outer lines of a square of 1 3/16 inches (30 mm) side is embossed with a knob embossed within each of the outer angles of the pattern. A raised circular space of diameter 1 1/16 inches (27 mm) is placed at the centre of the decoration. A centrally located lotus flower is embossed on the obverse side of the medal and the text "Padma" written in Devanagari script is placed above and the text "Bhushan" is placed below the lotus. The Emblem of India is placed in the centre of the reverse side with the national motto of India, "Satyameva Jayate" (Truth alone triumphs) in Devanagari Script, inscribed on the lower edge. The rim, the edges and all embossing on either side is of standard gold with the text "Padma Bhushan" of gold gilt. The medal is suspended by a pink riband 1 1/4 inches (32 mm) in width with a broad white stripe in the middle. It is ranked fifth in the order of precedence of wearing of medals and decorations of the Indian civilian and military awards. (Note: The order of precedence is: Bharat Ratna, Param Vir Chakra, Ashoka Chakra, Padma Vibhushan and Padma Bhushan.)

A total of twenty-three awards were conferred in 1954 followed by twelve in 1955; thirteen in 1956; sixteen in 1957; sixteen again in 1958, and fourteen in 1959, giving a total of 94 recipients in the first six years—including one foreign recipient awarded in 1955. Till 1959, individuals from nine different fields were awarded which includes twenty-six from literature and education, seventeen from civil service, twelve artists, ten from science and engineering, ten from social work, eight from public affairs, six from medicine, four sportspersons, and one from trade and industry.

== Overview ==
Award recipients by year
Year	Number of recipients
1954	23
1955	12
1956	13
1957	16
1958	16
1959	14

Award recipients by field
Field	Number of recipients
Arts	12
Civil Service	17
Literature & Education	26
Medicine	6
Public Affairs	8
Science & Engineering	10
Social Work	10
Sports	4
Trade & Industry	1

== Recipients ==
List of Padma Bhushan award recipients (1954–1959)
Year	Image	Laureates	Field	State / country
1954		Homi Jehangir Bhabha	Science and Engineering	Maharashtra
1954		Shanti Swaroop Bhatnagar	Science and Engineering	Uttar Pradesh
1954		Mahadeva Iyer Ganapati	Civil Service	Odisha
1954		Jnan Chandra Ghosh	Science and Engineering	West Bengal
1954		Radha Krishan Gupta	Civil Service	Delhi
1954		Maithili Sharan Gupt	Literature and Education	Uttar Pradesh
1954		R. R. Handa	Civil Service	Punjab
1954		Amarnath Jha	Literature and Education	Uttar Pradesh
1954		Ajudhiya Nath Khosla	Science and Engineering	Delhi
1954		Kariamanickam Srinivasa Krishnan	Science and Engineering	Tamil Nadu
1954		Hussain Ahmad Madani	Literature and Education	Uttar Pradesh
1954		Josh Malihabadi	Literature and Education	Delhi
1954		Vaikunthbhai Mehta	Public Affairs	Gujarat
1954		Vallathol Narayana Menon	Literature and Education	Kerala
1954		A. Lakshmanaswami Mudaliar	Literature and Education	Tamil Nadu
1954		Maharaj Kr. Palden T Namgyal	Public Affairs	Punjab
1954		V. Narahari Rao	Civil Service	Karnataka
1954		Pandyala Satyanarayana Rau	Civil Service	Andhra Pradesh
1954		Jamini Roy	Arts	West Bengal
1954		Sukumar Sen	Civil Service	West Bengal
1954		Satya Narayana Shastri	Medicine	Uttar Pradesh
1954		M. S. Subbulakshmi	Arts	Tamil Nadu
1954		Kodandera Subayya Thimayya	Civil Service	Karnataka
1955		Fateh Chand Badhwar	Civil Service	Punjab
1955		Lalit Mohan Banerjee	Medicine	West Bengal
1955		Suniti Kumar Chatterji	Literature and Education	West Bengal
1955		Kamaladevi Chattopadhyay	Social Work	West Bengal
1955		Surender Kumar Dey	Civil Service	Delhi
1955		Vasant Ramji Khanolkar	Medicine	Maharashtra
1955		Sunder Das Khungar	Civil Service	Punjab
1955		Rameshwari Nehru	Social Work	Uttar Pradesh
1955		Prana Krushna Parija	Literature and Education	Odisha
1955		Madapati Rao	Social Work	Andhra Pradesh
1955		Maneklal Sankalchand Thacker	Science and Engineering	Delhi
1955		Attur Rangaswami Venkatachari	Civil Service	Tamil Nadu
1956		Rukmini Devi Arundale	Arts	Tamil Nadu
1956		Rajshekhar Basu	Literature and Education	West Bengal
1956		Dhyan Chand	Sports	Punjab
1956		Malur Srinivasa Thirumale Iyengar	Civil Service	Tamil Nadu
1956		Nawab Zain Yar Jung	Public Affairs	Andhra Pradesh
1956		Pushpavati Janardanrai Mehta	Public Affairs	Maharashtra
1956		Cottari Kankaiyah Nayudu	Sports	Tamil Nadu
1956		Muthulakshmi Reddi	Medicine	Tamil Nadu
1956		Kanwar Sain	Civil Service	Rajasthan
1956		Vir Singh	Literature and Education	Punjab
1956		Kasturi Srinivasan	Literature and Education	Punjab
1956		Mahadevi Varma	Literature and Education	Uttar Pradesh
1956		Tiruvadi Sambasiva Venkataraman	Science and Engineering	Tamil Nadu
1957		Bhikham Lal Atreya	Literature and Education	Uttar Pradesh
1957		T. Balasaraswati	Arts	Tamil Nadu
1957		Alagappa Chettiar	Social Work	Tamil Nadu
1957		Hazari Prasad Dwivedi	Literature and Education	Uttar Pradesh
1957		Syed Abid Husain	Literature and Education	Uttar Pradesh
1957		Mushtaq Hussain Khan	Arts	Madhya Pradesh
1957		Lakshmi Menon	Public Affairs	Kerala
1957		Radha Kumud Mukherjee	Public Affairs	West Bengal
1957		K. Covilagam Kutti Ettan Raja	Civil Service	Kerala
1957		Andal Venkatasubba Rao	Social Work	Andhra Pradesh
1957		Shrikrishna N. Ratanjankar	Arts	Uttar Pradesh
1957		Shyam Nandan Sahay	Literature and Education	Bihar
1957		Govind Sakharam Sardesai	Literature and Education	Maharashtra
1957		K. A. Nilakanta Sastri	Literature and Education	Tamil Nadu
1957		Boshi Sen	Science and Engineering	West Bengal
1957		Siddheshwar Varma	Literature and Education	Chandigarh
1958		Salim Ali	Science and Engineering	Maharashtra
1958		Vijaya Anand	Sports	Uttar Pradesh
1958		D. P. Roy Choudhury	Arts	West Bengal
1958		Jehangir Ghandy	Trade and Industry	Maharashtra
1958		Narayan Subarao Hardikar	Social Work	Karnataka
1958		Ariyakudi Ramanuja Iyengar	Arts	Tamil Nadu
1958		Allauddin Khan	Arts	Uttar Pradesh
1958		Kumar Padma Siva Shankara Menon	Civil Service	Kerala
1958		Arathil C. Narayanan Nambiar	Civil Service	Kerala
1958		Kuppali Venkatappagowda Puttappa	Literature and Education	Karnataka
1958		Poola Tirupati Raju	Literature and Education	Rajasthan
1958		Kamalendumati Shah	Social Work	Delhi
1958		Rao Raja Hanut Singh	Public Affairs	Rajasthan
1958		Rustom Jal Vakil	Medicine	Maharashtra
1958		Surya Narayan Vyas	Literature and Education	Madhya Pradesh
1958		Darashaw Nosherwan Wadia	Science and Engineering	Maharashtra
1959		Sisir Kumar Bhaduri (Note: Sisir Kumar Bhaduri refused the award.)	Arts	West Bengal
1959		Ramdhari Singh Dinkar	Literature and Education	Bihar
1959		Ali Yavar Jung	Civil Service	Maharashtra
1959		Hansa Jivraj Mehta	Social Work	Maharashtra
1959		Pammal Sambandha Mudaliar	Arts	Tamil Nadu
1959		Tiruppattur R. Venkatachala Murti	Literature and Education	Tamil Nadu
1959		Tenzing Norgay	Sports	West Bengal
1959		Bhaurao Patil	Social Work	Maharashtra
1959		Jal Cawashaw Paymaster	Medicine	Maharashtra
1959		Dhanvanthi Rama Rau	Social Work	Maharashtra
1959		Nirmal Kumar Sidhanta	Literature and Education	West Bengal
1959		Kankanhalli Vasudevachary	Arts	Karnataka
1959		Bhargavaram Viththal Varerkar	Literature and Education	Maharashtra
1959		Ghulam Yazdani	Science and Engineering	Andhra Pradesh
