= List of Padma Bhushan award recipients (1990–1999) =

List of recipients of a civilian award in India

Padma Bhushan
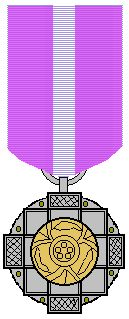
- Type: National Civilian
- Country: India
- Presented by: Government of India
- Ribbon
- Obverse: A centrally located lotus flower is embossed and the text "Padma" written in Devanagari script is placed above and the text "Bhushan" is placed below the lotus.
- Reverse: A platinum State Emblem of India placed in the centre with the national motto of India, "Satyameva Jayate" (Truth alone triumphs) in Devanagari Script
- Established: 1954
- First award: 1954

Highlights
- Total: 113
- Website: http://www.padmaawards.gov.in/

Precedence
- Next (higher): Padma Vibhushan

- Next (lower): Padma Shri

The Padma Bhushan is the third-highest civilian award of the Republic of India. Instituted on 2 January 1954, the award is given for "distinguished service of a high order", without distinction of race, occupation, position, or sex. The recipients receive a Sanad, a certificate signed by the President of India and a circular-shaped medallion with no monetary association. The recipients are announced every year on Republic Day (26 January) and registered in The Gazette of India, a publication used for official government notices and released weekly by the Department of Publication, under the Ministry of Urban Development. The conferral of the award is not considered official without its publication in the Gazette. The names of recipients whose awards have been revoked or restored, both of which require the authority of the President, are archived, and recipients who are struck from the register are required to surrender their medals; none of the conferments of Padma Bhushan during 1990–1999 have been revoked or restored. The recommendations are received from all the state and the union territory governments, as well as from Ministries of the Government of India, the Bharat Ratna and the Padma Vibhushan awardees, the Institutes of Excellence, the Ministers, the Chief Ministers and the Governors of State, and the Members of Parliament including private individuals.

When instituted in 1954, the Padma Bhushan was classified as "Dusra Varg" (Class II) under the three-tier Padma Vibhushan awards, which were preceded by the Bharat Ratna in hierarchy. On 15 January 1955, the Padma Vibhushan was reclassified into three different awards as the Padma Vibhushan, the Padma Bhushan and the Padma Shri. The criteria included "distinguished service of a high order in any field including service rendered by Government servants", but excluded those working with the public sector undertakings with the exception of doctors and scientists. The 1954 statutes did not allow posthumous awards; this was subsequently modified in the January 1955 statute. The design was also changed to the form that is currently in use; it portrays a circular-shaped toned bronze medallion 1 3/4 inches (44 mm) in diameter and 1/8 inch (3.2 mm) thick. The centrally placed pattern made of outer lines of a square of 1 3/16 inches (30 mm) side is embossed with a knob carved within each of the outer angles of the pattern. A raised circular space of diameter 1 1/16 inches (27 mm) is placed at the centre of the decoration. A centrally located lotus flower is embossed on the obverse side of the medal and the text "Padma" is placed above and the text "Bhushan" is placed below the lotus written in Devanagari script. The State Emblem of India is displayed in the centre of the reverse side, together with the national motto of India, "Satyameva Jayate" (Truth alone triumphs) in Devanagari script, which is inscribed on the lower edge. The rim, the edges and all embossing on either side is of standard gold with the text "Padma Bhushan" of gold gilt. The medal is suspended by a pink riband 1 1/4 inches (32 mm) in width with a broad white stripe in the middle. It is ranked fifth in the order of precedence of wearing of medals and decorations of the Indian civilian and military awards. (Note: The order of precedence is: Bharat Ratna, Param Vir Chakra, Ashoka Chakra, Padma Vibhushan and Padma Bhushan.)

In the 1990s, a total of 113 people were conferred with the award. Twenty-four awards were presented in both 1990 and 1991, followed by thirty-three in 1992. In February 1992, a writ petition was filed in the Kerala High Court questioning whether the civilian awards presented the Government of India were "titles" as per the Article 18 (1) of the Constitution of India. The subject constitutional article states that "no title, not being a military or academic distinction, shall be conferred by the State". Similar petition was also filed in August 1992 in the Indore Bench of the Madhya Pradesh High Court and a notice was issued on 25 August that led to provisional suspension of all civilian awards. A Special Divisional Bench of the Supreme Court of India was set up with a panel of five judges that delivered the verdict on 15 December 1995 that the "Bharat Ratna and Padma awards are not titles within Article 18 of the Constitution of India". Later in 1998 when the presentation of the awards resumed, eighteen recipients received the award followed by fourteen in 1999. The Padma Bhushan in the 1990s was also conferred upon five foreign recipients – two from the United Kingdom and one each from Japan, New Zealand, and the United States. Individuals from ten fields were honoured that included twenty-six artists, twenty-three from literature and education, eighteen from science and engineering, fifteen from medicine, eleven from public affairs, ten from social work, three sportspersons, three from trade and industry, and two from civil services and other fields each.

Journalist Nikhil Chakravarty declined the award in 1990 so as to "not be identified with the establishment". Historian Romila Thapar declined to accept the award in 1992, and later again in 2005, stating that she would accept awards only "from academic institutions or those associated with my professional work". Similar to Chakravarty, journalist and civil servant K. Subrahmanyam also refused the honour citing that "bureaucrats and journalists should not accept any award from the government because they are more liable to be favoured."

== Recipients ==
Award recipients by year
Year	Number of recipients
1990	24
1991	24
1992	33
1993	0
1994	0
1995	0
1996	0
1997	0
1998	18
1999	14

Award recipients by field
Field	Number of recipients
Arts	26
Civil Service	2
Literature & Education	24
Medicine	15
Others	2
Public Affairs	11
Science & Engineering	17
Social Work	10
Sports	3
Trade & Industry	3

Key
# Indicates a posthumous honour

=== Padma Bhushan Award recipients in the year 1990 ===
List of Padma Bhushan award recipients, showing the year, field, and state/country
Year	Portrait	Laureates	Field	State
1990		Rajanikant Arole	Social Work	Maharashtra
1990		Bimal Kumar Bachhawat	Science & Engineering	Delhi
1990		Purushottam Laxman Deshpande	Arts	Maharashtra
1990		Sattaiyappa Dhandapani Desikar	Literature & Education	Tamil Nadu
1990		L. K. Doraiswamy	Science & Engineering	United States
1990		Nikhil Ghosh	Arts	Maharashtra
1990		B. K. Goyal	Medicine	Maharashtra
1990		Jasraj	Arts	Maharashtra
1990		Mohammad Khalilullah	Medicine	Delhi
1990		R. N. Malhotra	Civil Service	Maharashtra
1990		Bimal Krishna Matilal	Literature & Education	United Kingdom
1990		Inder Mohan	Social Work	Delhi
1990		Sumant Moolgaokar (Note: Sumant Moolgaokar died on 1 July 1989, at the age of 82.)#	Trade & Industry	Maharashtra
1990		Hirendranath Mukherjee	Literature & Education	West Bengal
1990		C. D. Narasimhaiah	Literature & Education	Karnataka
1990		M. S. Narasimhan	Science & Engineering	Maharashtra
1990		Kunwar Singh Negi	Literature & Education	Uttar Pradesh
1990		Trilochan Pradhan	Literature & Education	Odisha
1990		N. Ram	Literature & Education	Tamil Nadu
1990		Sukumar Sen	Literature & Education	West Bengal
1990		Arun Shourie	Literature & Education	Delhi
1990		Julius Silverman	Public Affairs	United Kingdom
1990		M. R. Srinivasan	Science & Engineering	Maharashtra
1990		M. S. Valiathan	Medicine	Kerala

=== Padma Bhushan Award recipients in the year 1991 ===
List of Padma Bhushan award recipients, showing the year, field, and state/country
Year	Portrait	Laureates	Field	State
1991		Ebrahim Alkazi	Arts	Delhi
1991		Lala Amarnath	Sports	Delhi
1991		Narayan Shridhar Bendre	Arts	Maharashtra
1991		Shyam Benegal	Arts	Maharashtra
1991		D. B. Deodhar	Sports	Maharashtra
1991		Amjad Ali Khan	Arts	Delhi
1991		Dilip Kumar	Arts	Maharashtra
1991		Narayan Singh Manaklao	Social Work	Rajasthan
1991		Muthu Krishna Mani	Medicine	Tamil Nadu
1991		Ram Narayan	Arts	Maharashtra
1991		Fali Sam Nariman	Public Affairs	Delhi
1991		Kapil Dev	Sports	Delhi
1991		Manubhai Pancholi	Public Affairs	Gujarat
1991		Shakuntala Paranjpye	Social Work	Maharashtra
1991		Bindeshwar Pathak	Social Work	Bihar
1991		Samta Prasad	Arts	Uttar Pradesh
1991		Basavaraj Rajguru	Arts	Karnataka
1991		Prathap C. Reddy	Medicine	Andhra Pradesh
1991		Amala Shankar	Arts	West Bengal
1991		Vishnu Vaman Shirwadkar (Kusumagraj)	Literature & Education	Maharashtra
1991		Kuthur Ramakrishnan Srinivasan	Literature & Education	Tamil Nadu
1991		Ale Ahmad Suroor	Literature & Education	Uttar Pradesh
1991		Leslie Denis Swindale	Science & Engineering	— (Note: Indicates a citizen of New Zealand)
1991		Jiwan Singh Umranangal	Public Affairs	Punjab

=== Padma Bhushan Award recipients in the year 1992 ===
List of Padma Bhushan award recipients, showing the year, field, and state/country
Year	Portrait	Laureates	Field	State
1992		Bijoy Chandra Bhagavati	Public Affairs	Assam
1992		Debu Chaudhuri	Arts	Delhi
1992		Hariprasad Chaurasia	Arts	Maharashtra
1992		Thayil John Cherian	Medicine	Tamil Nadu
1992		Ranjan Roy Daniel	Science & Engineering	Tamil Nadu
1992		Virendra Dayal	Civil Service	Delhi
1992		B. Saroja Devi	Arts	Karnataka
1992		Khem Singh Gill	Science & Engineering	Punjab
1992		Vavilala Gopalakrishnayya	Public Affairs	Andhra Pradesh
1992		Anna Hazare	Social Work	Maharashtra
1992		Hakim Abdul Hameed	Medicine	Delhi
1992		Jaggayya	Arts	Andhra Pradesh
1992		Girish Karnad	Arts	Karnataka
1992		Krishnaswamy Kasturirangan	Science & Engineering	Karnataka
1992		Triloki Nath Khoshoo	Science & Engineering	Delhi
1992		Goro Koyama	Others	— (Note: Indicates a citizen of Japan)
1992		Adusumalli Radha Krishna	Arts	Andhra Pradesh
1992		T. N. Krishnan	Arts	Tamil Nadu
1992		Ramachandra Datatraya Lele	Medicine	Maharashtra
1992		Talat Mahmood	Arts	Maharashtra
1992		Syed Abdul Malik	Literature & Education	Assam
1992		Dalsukh Dahyabhai Malvania	Literature & Education	Gujarat
1992		Sonal Mansingh	Arts	Delhi
1992		M. Sarada Menon	Social Work	Tamil Nadu
1992		Naushad	Arts	Maharashtra
1992		Setu Madhavrao Pagdi	Literature & Education	Maharashtra
1992		Hasmukhbhai Parekh	Trade & Industry	Maharashtra
1992		C. Narayana Reddy	Literature & Education	Andhra Pradesh
1992		Mrinalini Sarabhai	Arts	Gujarat
1992		Gursaran Talwar	Medicine	Delhi
1992		Brihaspati Dev Triguna	Medicine	Delhi
1992		K. Venkatalakshamma	Arts	Karnataka
1992		C. R. Vyas	Arts	Maharashtra

=== Padma Bhushan Award recipients in the year 1998 ===
List of Padma Bhushan award recipients, showing the year, field, and state/country
Year	Portrait	Laureates	Field	State
1998		U. R. Ananthamurthy	Literature & Education	Karnataka
1998		Sivaramakrishna Chandrasekhar	Science & Engineering	Karnataka
1998		Debiprasad Chattopadhyaya	Literature & Education	West Bengal
1998		Satyapal Dang	Public Affairs	Punjab
1998		Gurbaksh Singh Dhillon	Public Affairs	Madhya Pradesh
1998		H. K. Dua	Literature & Education	Delhi
1998		Maligali Ram Krishna Girinath	Medicine	Tamil Nadu
1998		Hemlata Gupta	Medicine	Delhi
1998		K. M. Mathew	Literature & Education	Kerala
1998		G. Madhavan Nair	Science & Engineering	Kerala
1998		Rajendra Singh Paroda	Science & Engineering	Delhi
1998		G. B. Parulkar	Medicine	Maharashtra
1998		Vaidyeswaran Rajaraman	Science & Engineering	Karnataka
1998		Bhisham Sahni	Literature & Education	Delhi
1998		Vempati Chinna Satyam	Arts	Tamil Nadu
1998		Laxmi Mall Singhvi	Public Affairs	Delhi
1998		V. M. Tarkunde	Public Affairs	Uttar Pradesh
1998		Panangipalli Venugopal	Medicine	Delhi

=== Padma Bhushan Award recipients in the year 1999 ===
List of Padma Bhushan award recipients, showing the year, field, and state/country
Year	Portrait	Laureates	Field	State
1999		S. S. Badrinath	Medicine	Tamil Nadu
1999		Jag Pravesh Chandra	Public Affairs	Delhi
1999		Jacob Cherian	Social Work	Tamil Nadu
1999		Pushpalata Das	Social Work	Assam
1999		Sohrab Pirojsha Godrej	Trade & Industry	Maharashtra
1999		George Joseph	Science & Engineering	Gujarat
1999		Anil Kakodkar	Science & Engineering	Maharashtra
1999		D. C. Kizhakemuri (Note: D. C. Kizhakemuri died on 26 January 1999, at the age of 85.)#	Literature & Education	Kerala
1999		Ashok Kumar	Arts	Maharashtra
1999		Vidya Niwas Mishra	Literature & Education	Uttar Pradesh
1999		Krishnamurthy Santhanam	Science & Engineering	Delhi
1999		H. D. Shourie	Social Work	Delhi
1999		Shivmangal Singh Suman	Literature & Education	Madhya Pradesh
1999		Ram Kinkar Upadhyay	Others	Uttar Pradesh

== Explanatory notes ==
Non-citizen recipients

Posthumous recipients
