= Rashtriya Puraskar =

- Sponsored by: Government of India
- Country: India
- Website: awards.gov.in

Rashtriya Puraskar (Hindi: राष्ट्रीय पुरस्कार) is an online portal launched by Government of India on 27 July 2022. By this web portal any citizen of India can nominate someone for National Award on a single platform.

== Awards ==
- Padma Awards
- Kaushalacharya Award
- National Award for Senior Citizens
- National Award for Individual Excellence
- National Award for Individual Excellence
- National Awards for Institutions Engaged in Empowering Persons with Disabilities
- National Awards for Institutions Engaged in Empowering Persons with Disabilities
- National CSR Awards
- Nari Shakti Puraskar
- Subhash Chandra Bose Aapda Prabandhan Puraskar
- National Awards for e-Governance
- Sardar Patel National Unity Award
- National Awards for Outstanding Services in the Field of Prevention of Alcoholism and Substance Abuse
- Jeevan Raksha Padak
