= List of people who have declined or renounced Indian honours and decorations =

The following is an incomplete list of people who have either declined or renounced an Indian honour or decoration. These include recipients of the Bharat Ratna and the Padma awards (Padma Vibhushan, Padma Bhushan, Padma Shri), along with other Indian governmental awards. In some instances, the families of an intended posthumous recipient of a national honour have declined the award for various reasons. Since the honours system was instituted in 1954, approximately 50 individuals have either refused or returned their honours, most of which were awarded in the categories of Art and in Literature and Education.

The President of India may cancel and annul any honour if the recipient commits any acts of criminal misconduct or otherwise abuses the award. As there are no specific guidelines for otherwise withdrawing a national honour from a recipient, the acts of returning/renouncing an award to register a protest, or refusing an award after an official awards list has been published, are only symbolic actions. For instance, while independence activist and educationist Asha Devi Aryanayakam refused the Padma Shri after it was conferred upon her in 1954, she remains on the official register of Padma awardees. In 1984, poet and novelist Khushwant Singh, a 1974 Padma Bhushan honoree, returned the honour to protest the Indian army's Operation Blue Star; in spite of this, he remains listed as a Padma Bhushan recipient.

== Bharat Ratna ==
=== Refused the honor ===
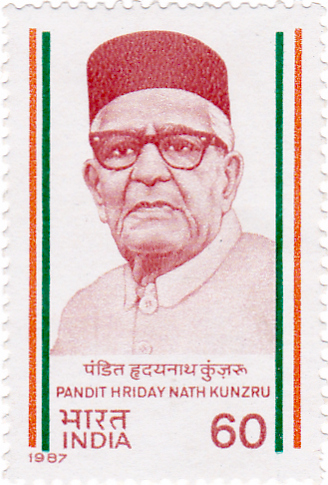
H N Kunzru

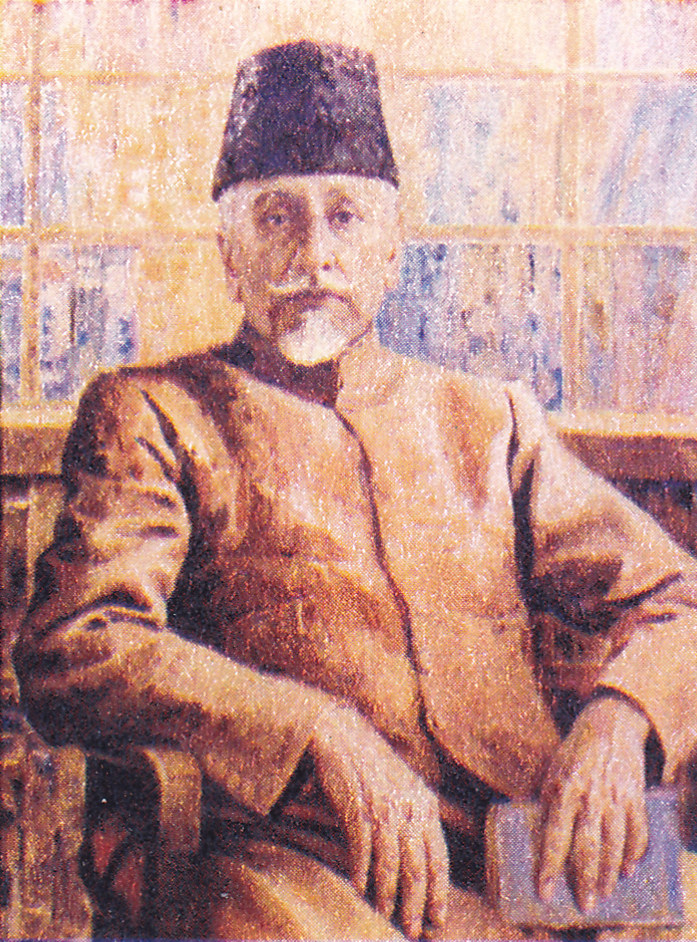
Maulana Abul Kalam Azad

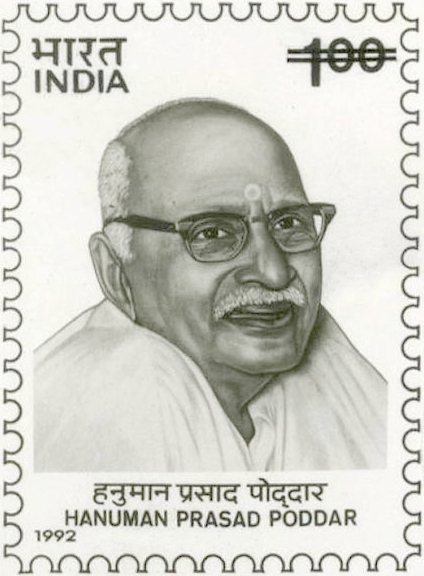
"Bhaiji" Hanuman Prasad Poddar
- An Indian freedom fighter and public figure, H. N. Kunzru was nominated for the highest Indian civilian award, the Bharat Ratna, in 1968 but he declined, citing his opposition to such honours in a Republic, which he had first voiced during the Constituent Assembly debates.
- Prominent independence movement leader and India's first Minister of Education Maulana Abul Kalam Azad declined the honour, arguing that those who were on selection committees for national honours should not themselves receive them. He received a posthumous Bharat Ratna in 1992.
- A freedom fighter and a spiritual leader, Hanuman Prasad Poddar was nominated personally by then Home Minister Govind Ballabh Pant on special request by President of India, Rajendra Prasad but he politely declined, saying he wished to avoid honours and felt that accepting such awards could lead to awkward political situations.

=== Refusal of posthumous conferment (Subhas Chandra Bose) ===
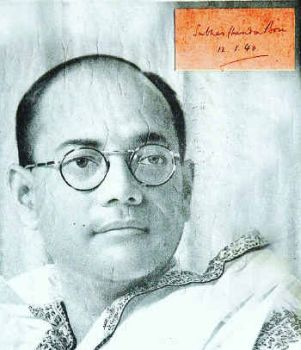
Subhash Chandra Bose

In 1992, the surviving family of nationalist leader and revolutionary Subhas Chandra Bose, who had died under mysterious circumstances in 1945, were contacted about accepting a posthumous Bharat Ratna on Bose's behalf; however, his family declined the honour, citing the length of time it had taken the government to recognize him.

== Padma Vibhushan ==
=== Refused the honour ===
- P. N. Haksar was offered the award in 1973 for, among other services, his crucial diplomatic role in brokering the Indo-Soviet Treaty of Friendship and Cooperation and the Shimla Agreement, but declined as "Accepting an award for work done somehow causes an inexplicable discomfort to me."

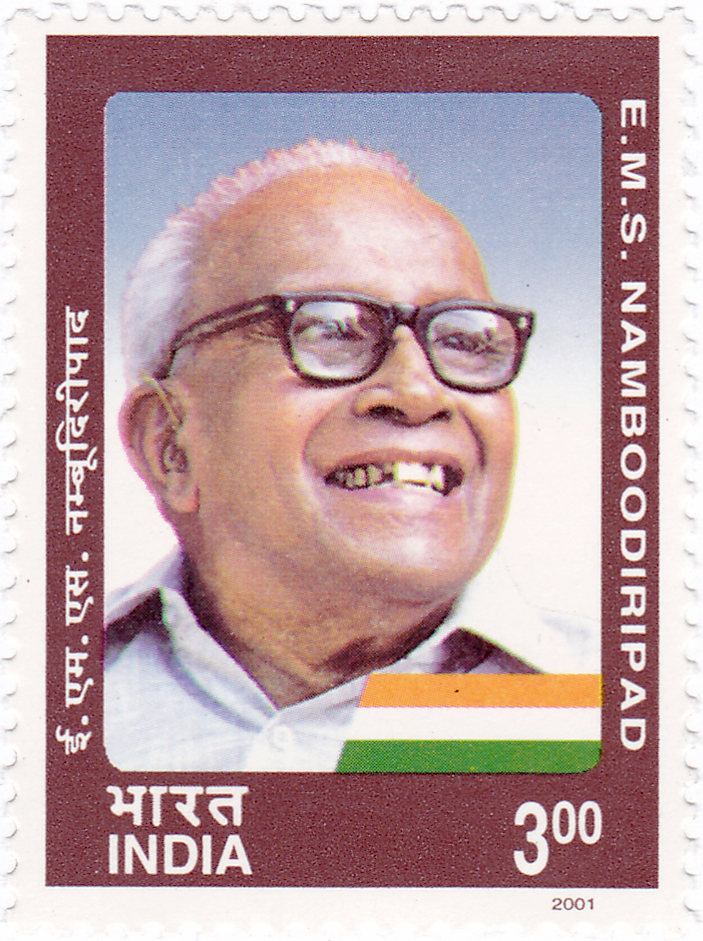

- E. M. S. Namboodiripad, the former General Secretary of the Communist Party of India (of the Communist Party of India (Marxist) from 1978) and the first Chief Minister of Kerala (1957–59, 1967–69), declined the award in 1992, as it went against his nature to accept a state honour.

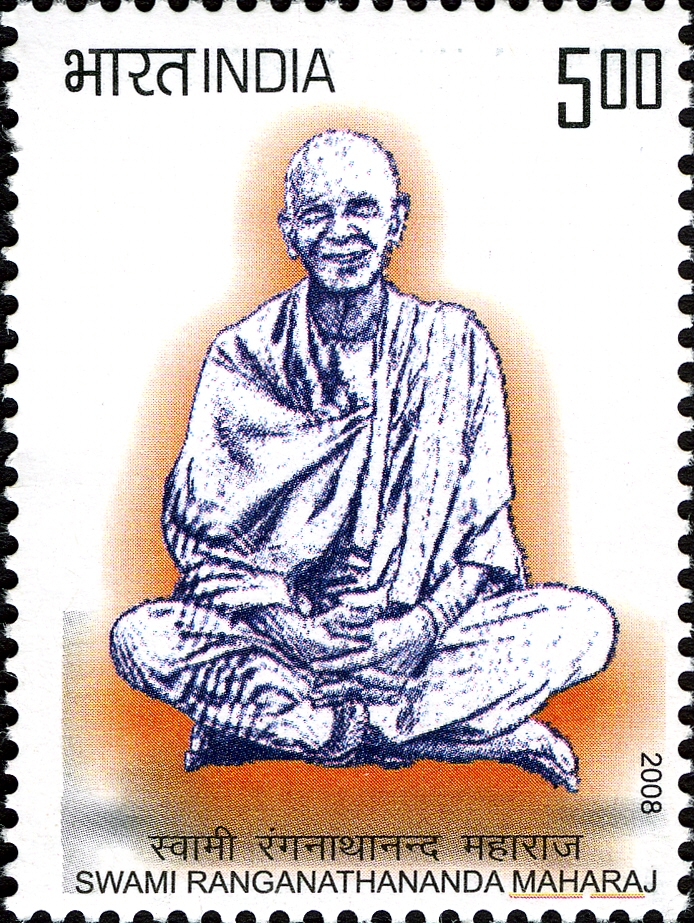

- Swami Ranganathananda declined the award in 2000 as it was conferred to him as an individual and not to the Ramakrishna Mission.

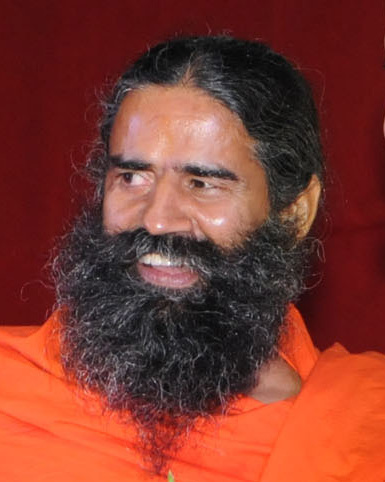

- Yoga Guru and leader and founder of the Patanjali Baba Ramdev declined the Padma Vibhushan in 2015 as "we work with a spirit of a saints, and awards are irrelevant to us."

=== Returned the honour ===
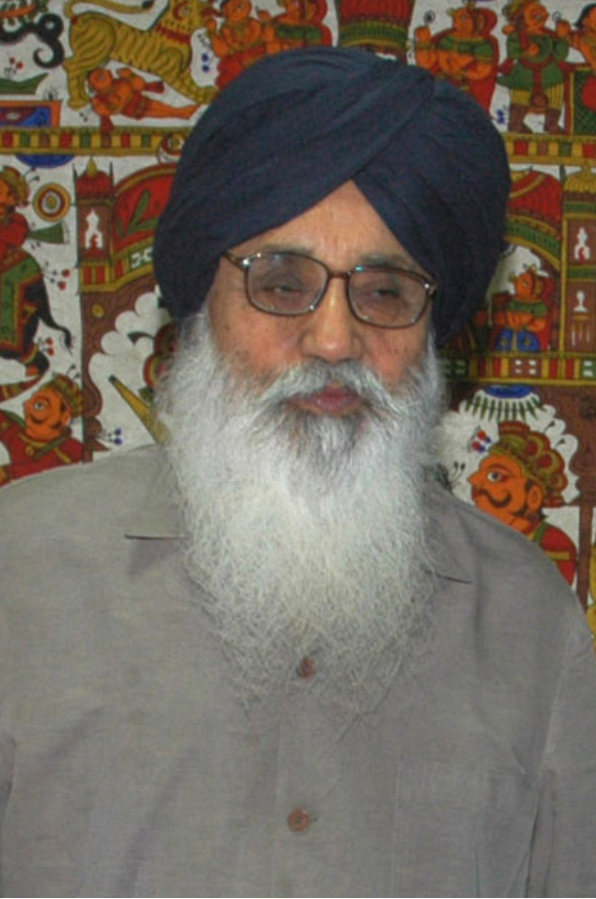

- Parkash Singh Badal, a former chief minister of Punjab and a 2015 Padma Vibhushan recipient, returned the honour in December 2020 in support of the 2020–2021 Indian farmers' protests, writing to the President "I am who I am because of the people, especially the common farmer. Today, when [the farmer] has lost more than his honour, I see no point in holding on to the Padma Vibhushan honour."

=== Refusal of posthumous conferment ===
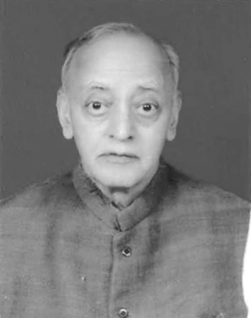

- In 2011, the family of Lakshmi Chand Jain refused to accept the posthumous honour as Jain was against accepting state honours.

== Padma Bhushan ==
=== Refused the honour ===
- Bengali theatre activist Sisir Kumar Bhaduri (1959) was the first awardee who refused his conferment as "he felt state awards merely help create a sycophantic brigade" and "did not want to encourage the impression that the government was serious about the importance of theatre in national life."
- Sociologist G. S. Ghurye declined the honour as he felt he deserved the higher Padma Vibhushan, given the calibre of others who had received the more prestigious decoration.
- Journalist Nikhil Chakravarty rejected the award in 1990 stating that the "journalists should not be identified with the establishment."
- Historian Romila Thapar refused to accept the award twice, for the first time in 1992, and later again in 2005, stating that she would accept awards only "from academic institutions or those associated with my professional work." For her 2005 bestowal, Thapar sent a clarification letter to the then President A. P. J. Abdul Kalam mentioning that she had declined to accept the award when the Ministry of Human Resource Development had contacted her three month prior to the award announcement and had explained her reasons for not accepting the award.
- Journalist and civil servant K. Subrahmanyam also refused his 1999 bestowal citing that "bureaucrats and journalists should not accept any award from the government because they are more liable to be favoured."
- Industrialist Keshub Mahindra (2002, reasons not given)
- In 2003, Rashtriya Swayamsevak Sangh's (RSS) volunteer Dattopant Thengadi rejected the award until K. B. Hedgewar (RSS founder) and M. S. Golwalkar (RSS ideologue) were offered the Bharat Ratna.
- Former Minister of Commerce and Industry of Rajasthan and Sarvodaya activist Siddharaj Dhadda (declined in 2003).
- Civil servant S. R. Sankaran turned down the award in 2005, as he could not accept any award for merely doing his duty.
- Author Krishna Sobti declined to accept in 2010, as she was already a 1996 recipient of a Sahitya Akademi Fellowship, "the biggest recognition for a writer," and that as a writer she "had to keep a distance from the establishment."
- In 2013, playback singer S. Janaki refused to accept her award and stated that "the award has come late in her five-and-half-decade long career." The singer also mentioned that she is not against the Government and expressed happiness for the recognition but requested the Government to "show some more consideration to the artists from the southern parts of the country.
- Former Chief Minister of West Bengal and Communist Party of India (Marxist) leader Buddhadeb Bhattacharjee declined the honour in 2022, saying "Nobody said anything to me about this. If I have been given the award, then I refuse it."

=== Refusal of posthumous conferment ===
- In 2014, family members of J. S. Verma who served as 27th Chief Justice of India refused the posthumous conferral stating that "Verma himself would not have accepted" the honour as he "never hankered or lobbied for any acclaim, reward or favour."

=== Returned the honour ===
- Hindi author and parliamentarian Seth Govind Das, who had received the honour in 1961, returned it in 1968 to protest the amendment of the Official Languages Act, 1963, which allowed for the continued official use of the English language.
- Hindi novelist and playwright Vrindavan Lal Verma, who had been honoured in 1965, returned the honour in 1968 to protest the amendment of the Official Languages Act 1963, which allowed for the continued official use of the English language.
- Kannada novelist K. Shivaram Karanth, who was honoured in 1968, returned his award to protest against the Emergency declared in the country in 1975.
- Social worker Inder Mohan, who had been honoured in 1990, returned his award the following year "in protest against anti-people policies of the establishment as a whole rather than a particular Government."
- Indian freedom fighter and Communist Party of India leader Satyapal Dang, a 1998 recipient, returned the honour in 2005 to protest the "gross violation" of government honours.
- Pushpa Mittra Bhargava, 1986 recipient and scientist and founder-director of Centre for Cellular and Molecular Biology (CCMB), returned his award in 2015 in protest of the Dadri mob lynching and out of concern at the "prevailing socio-political situation" in the country.
- Sukhdev Singh Dhindsa, a 2019 recipient and leader of the Shiromani Akali Dal (Democratic) party, returned the award in December 2020 in support of the 2020–2021 Indian farmers' protests, stating the honour was "worthless" when the BJP-led federal government was ignoring farmers.
- In 1968, one unidentified recipient of the Padma Bhushan returned the honour to protest the Official Languages (Amendment) Bill.

== Padma Shri ==
=== Refused the honour ===
- Freedom fighter and educationist Asha Devi Aryanayakam (1954; on personal grounds).
- Politician Kashi Prasad Pandey (1967; on personal grounds).
- Odia poet and dramatist Kavichandra Kalicharan Patnaik (1974; on personal grounds).
- Vocalist Tarapada Chakraborty (1974; on personal grounds).
- Music director and composer Hemanta Mukherjee (1988, for unknown reasons).
- Philanthropist Dipchand Savraj Gardi (1915-2014) (2002, reasons not given).
- Academic and author Mamoni Raisom Goswami declined the honour in 2002 after admirers observed she had previously received the Jnanpith Award and therefore should not accept a less-prestigious Padma Shri.
- Author Chandra Prasad Saikia (2002, reasons not given). He received a posthumous Padma Bhushan in 2007.
- Assamese journalist Kanak Sen Deka declined the honour in 2005, stating his acceptance of the lowest-ranking Padma award would have diminished the prestigious literary and journalism awards he had already received.
- Kuntagodu Vibhuti Subbanna (awarded in the Arts category; declined in 2005).
- Malayalam writer Sukumar Azhikode refused the honour in 2007, deeming it "unconstitutional."
- Noted Bollywood screenwriter Salim Khan refused the Padma Shri in 2015 as "it does not match my status and work."
- Tamil writer B. Jeyamohan declined in 2016, stating that as a writer who was already being targeted for his politics, acceptance of the award could compromise his independence and the integrity of his ideas."
- Journalist Virendra Kapoor declined the honour in 2016, stating, "I have nothing against the government, [but] I have not accepted anything from any government in the last 40 years, and I don’t believe in taking anything from the government."
- Sitarist Imrat Khan, the younger brother of Vilayat Khan, declined the honour in 2017 as he had "mixed feelings about...the purpose of this award which comes perhaps many decades late — while my juniors receive the Padma Bhushan."
- Spiritual teacher Siddeshwar Swami of the Jnana Yogashrama in Vijayapura declined the honour in 2018 as a sanyasi did not need "any award or honour," and that he had "not accepted any awards" before.
- Author Gita Mehta declined the honour in 2019, stating that while she was "deeply honoured that the Government of India should think me worthy of a Padma Shri," she felt it necessary to decline "with great regret" due to the upcoming general elections, "as the timing of the award might be misconstrued, causing embarrassment both to the Government and myself, which I would much regret."
- Singer and musician Sandhya Mukherjee declined the honour in 2022 as she felt "insulted" by the offer of a relatively lower-ranked Padma Shri, given her well-recognised stature and her advanced age.
- Tabla musician Anindo Chatterjee declined the honour in 2022 as he had "passed the phase" when he would have felt able to accept a Padma Shri. He noted he would have accepted the honour with gratitude had it been conferred on him a decade previously, and that "many of my contemporaries and juniors were given [the] Padma Shri years ago."

=== Refusal of posthumous conferment ===
- In 2015 the family of Syedna Mohammed Burhanuddin, the Da'i al-Mutlaq of the Dawoodi Bohra sect of Ismaili Shia Muslims, declined a posthumous Padma Shri on his behalf, citing personal reasons.

=== Returned the honour ===
- Hindi poet and journalist Gopal Prasad Vyas, who had been honoured in 1965, returned the honour in 1968 to protest the amendment of the Official Languages Act 1963, which allowed for the continued official use of the English language.
- In 1977, author Phanishwar Nath 'Renu' returned the Padma Shri he had received in 1970, as a protest against the Emergency.
- In February 1984, Kashmiri writer Akhtar Mohiuddin returned the Padma Shri he had received in 1968 to protest the execution of Kashmiri separatist Maqbool Bhat.
- Journalist and author Sadhu Singh Hamdard accepted the award in January 1984, but returned it six months later to protest the Indian Army's Operation Blue Star.
- Poet Kaifi Azmi returned his Padma Shri in the 1980s after the then Chief Minister of Uttar Pradesh Vir Bahadur Singh remarked that those speaking Urdu as a second language should be made to sit on a donkey and paraded. According to his daughter Shabana Azmi, her father replied that he had written in Urdu all his life, and if his State’s Chief Minister held such views on the language, he, as a writer, must stand up for himself.
- Playwright Ratan Thiyam returned his honour, which he had received in 1989, in 2001 to protest the central government's extending the territorial limits of its cease-fire in the conflict with the National Socialist Council of Nagaland (Isak-Muivah). As Thiyam stated, "no tangible effort or urgency [to ameliorate the situation in Manipur] is visible on the part of the Centre. It is decaying by the day and there is no helping hand coming forward. It is not disrespect for the civilian honour of Padma Shri conferred on me, it is the compulsion of my bleeding heart. Although it is a very painful decision, I am, as a protest, relinquishing this honour."
- In October 2015, Punjabi author Dalip Kaur Tiwana returned the Padma Shri she had been awarded in 2004, citing her "anguish" over a growing intolerance towards free speech and expression in 21st-century India.
- In November 2015, noted poet Jayanta Mahapatra returned the honour which he had been awarded in 2009, due to "growing intolerance" in India.
- In February 2019, acclaimed Manipuri filmmaker Aribam Syam Sharma returned the Padma Shri awarded to him in 2006 to protest the Citizenship (Amendment) Bill, as he felt the legislation threatened Manipur's culture and identity.
- In December 2019, noted Urdu author and satirist Mujtaba Hussain returned the Padma Shri awarded to him in 2007 to express his unhappiness over what he perceived to be an increasing state of lawlessness in India and a general decline in democratic values and political statesmanship. "As a citizen, I am not happy in the country...mob lynching is happening, rapes are happening, criminal activities are growing day by day in the country...Politicians are not running the government or goonda raj is happening or whatever is happening. [The] common man is worried... [the] common man is dying and there is no attention towards him."
- In 2023, Bajrang Punia returned the Padma Shri.
- In 1968, two unidentified recipients of the Padma Shri returned their honours to protest the Official Languages (Amendment) Bill.

== Arjuna Award ==
=== Refused the award ===
Milkha Singh refused the award in September 2001, stating after having received the Padma Shri in 1958, it was meaningless to receive a less-prestigious award, and the award itself was being given to low-calibre athletes and had become heavily politicized, which had taken away any prestige it might have once had.

=== Returned the award ===
- In September 2010, boxer Laishram Sarita Devi, a 2009 recipient, returned the award to protest corruption in the government's management of Indian sports.
- Vinesh Phogat

== Accepted an honour but subsequently declined one ==
- Acclaimed Kathak dancer Sitara Devi accepted a Padma Shri in 1973, but declined a Padma Bhushan, declaring it "an insult, not an honor," and further stated "Is this government not aware of my contribution to Kathak? I will not accept any award less than Bharat Ratna."

== Refused or returned an honour, but subsequently accepted one ==
- Environmental activist and Chipko movement leader Sunderlal Bahuguna refused the Padma Shri in 1981 to protest the felling of trees in the Himalayan regions of India. He later accepted the Padma Vibhushan in 2009.
- Film and stage actor Soumitra Chatterjee declined the Padma Shri in the 1970s, but accepted a Padma Bhushan in 2004 "since I do not want to hurt the feelings of my admirers."
- English billiards champion Michael Ferreira refused the Padma Shri in 1981 as cricketer Sunil Gavaskar had been awarded the more prestigious Padma Bhushan; as Ferreira noted, his "achievements in billiards were no less than Sunil Gavaskar's in cricket" and deserved equal recognition. He accepted a Padma Bhushan in 1983.
- Sarod master Buddhadev Das Gupta refused the Padma Shri in 2011 as he felt undeserving younger musicians had already received it before him. He accepted a Padma Bhushan in 2012.
- In 1991, social worker and activist Anna Hazare returned the Padma Shri, which he had received in 1990, as a protest against corruption. He however accepted a Padma Bhushan the following year.
- Spiritual leader and founder of the Art of Living Foundation Ravi Shankar declined the Padma Vibhushan in 2015 as "there are other deserving people." In 2016, however, responding to recipients of national honours who were returning them to the government, he accepted the honour.
- Novelist Khushwant Singh, who accepted the Padma Bhushan in 1974 in the category of literature and education, returned it in 1984 to protest the Indian military's Operation Blue Star. Singh was later awarded the Padma Vibhushan in 2007.
- Mother Teresa initially declined the Padma Shri in 1960 and 1961 as she felt it improper to receive recognition for service in the name of God. The Archbishop of Kolkata finally persuaded her to accept the honour in 1962. She was later awarded the Bharat Ratna in 1980, the year after she received the Nobel Peace Prize.

== Refused or returned multiple honours ==
- In 1991, social activist Baba Amte returned his Padma Vibhushan, along with the Padma Shri conferred in 1971, to protest against the treatment given to the tribals during the construction of Sardar Sarovar Dam.
- Industrialist K. K. Birla was offered the Padma Bhushan in 1976 by Indira Gandhi, but refused as he was "not enamoured of titles" and further considered the honour "too insignificant." He was subsequently promised a Padma Vibhushan after first being awarded the Padma Bhushan, but again declined the offer as accepting a Padma Vibhushan would equate his achievements with his more distinguished father G. D. Birla's, which in his mind would be disrespectful.
- Social worker and Gandhian Amalprava Das refused the Padma Shri on personal grounds in 1954. She later declined a Padma Vibhushan.
- Agricultural economist and politician Sharad Anantrao Joshi declined the Padma Shri in 1992 over the government's agricultural policies, which he felt marginalized farmers. In 2016, his family refused a posthumous Padma Vibhushan on his behalf as Joshi's work for the good of farmers was not reflected in the Government policies for them.
- Sitarist Vilayat Khan refused Padma Shri (1964), Padma Bhushan (1968), and Padma Vibhushan (2000) and stated that "the selection committees were incompetent to judge [his] music".
- Manikonda Chalapathi Rau, journalist and editor of the National Herald, returned his Padma Bhushan in 1969, citing personal reasons. He subsequently refused the Padma Vibhushan.
- Playwright Badal Sarkar rejected the Padma Shri in 1972 as he was already a 1968 recipient of the Sangeet Natak Akademi Award, which he said was the best recognition for a writer. He refused a Padma Bhushan in 2010 for the same reason.
- In 2015, poet Surjit Patar returned the Sahitya Akademi Award he had received in 1993, to protest a climate of "intolerance" in India. In December 2020, he returned the Padma Shri awarded to him in 2012.

== Military decorations ==
- In April 1990, Lt. Gen. S. C. Sardeshpande, a commander of the Indian Peace Keeping Force in the Sri Lankan Civil War, returned the Uttam Yudh Seva Medal (UYSM) conferred on him in January 1989, "in the context of criticism in Tamil Nadu of the role of the IPKF in Sri Lanka." As no provisions for returning military decorations existed, however, the medal was returned to the general.

== Annulment of Padma awards ==
While there are no specific criteria for withdrawing a Padma award from an honoree, the President of India, per the awards' statutes, may cancel and annul any award in the case of any misconduct committed by the recipient.

At least three awards of the Padma Shri have been cancelled and annulled, twice in 1958 for recipients residing in the state of Punjab and once in 1974 for a recipient residing in the state of Gujarat.
