= M. Ganapati =

Indian engineer (1903–1976)

M. Ganapati after receiving the Padma Bhushan award for distinguished services to India in 1954, in the very first awards ceremony.

M. Ganapati (also spelt M. Ganapathi) (1903–1976) was an Indian engineer and engineering administrator who played leading roles in several major infrastructure and industrial projects in India.The Rourkela Steel Plant in Orissa, and many Railway projects including Churchgate railway station in Mumbai and Chittaranjan Locomotive Works (CLW) were completed under his leadership. The Indian government awarded him the inaugural Padma Bhushan in 1954. He was the president of the Institution of Engineers (India) for 1973-74.

The main projects with which he was associated with are:

- Rourkela Steel Plant
- Kandla Port
- Malaviya Bridge at Varanasi
- Chittaranjan Loco Works
- Perambur Integral Coach factory
- Vivekananda Setu, Kolkata (as Deputy)
- Churchgate Railway Station and other Western Railway projects

== Awards and honours ==
- Railway Board Gold Medal, 1950
- Viceroy's Prize from Institution of Engineers India, 1953
- Padma Bhushan (1954)
