= Rajanikant Arole =

Indian healthcare worker (1934–2011)

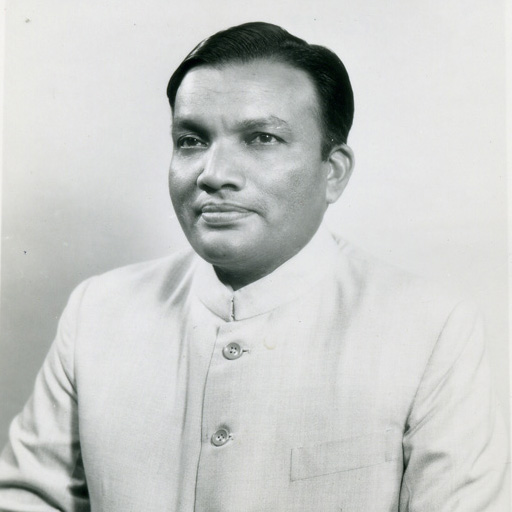
- Rajanikant Arole
- Born: Rajanikant; 18 September 1934; Rahuri, Maharashtra, India
- Died: 26 May 2011; Pune, Maharashtra, India
- Occupations: Health care, Social Service
- Years active: 1970–2011
- Known for: Rural Health Project, Jamkhed
- Spouse: Mabelle Arole
- Awards: Ramon Magsaysay Award (1970); Padma Bhushan (1990)

Rajnikant Shankarrao Arole (1934, Supa, Ahmednagar district, Maharashtra—26 May 2011, Pune, Maharashtra) was an Indian healthcare worker.

== Early life and career ==
Arole was born on 10 July 1934, the second child of Shankar and Leelawati Salve Arole. His parents were both schoolteachers and his father became Inspector of Schools. The Aroles raised their three sons and four daughters in the faith of the Church of England, inculcating in them Christian ethical and spiritual values that have guided Arole through a lifetime of public service.

Arole began working at ETCM Hospital in Kolar as a resident in 1960. In 1962, he moved to FJFM Hospital in the Vadala Mission District in Ahmednagar to be a medical superintendent. In 1966, he took up a residency at Lutheran Hospital in Cleveland, Ohio, US during his Fulbright Scholarship. He returned to India in 1970 to oversee the Comprehensive Rural Health Project in Jamkhed District Ahmednagar as Director.

He became a visiting Associate Professor at Johns Hopkins in Baltimore, Maryland, US in 1989 and became Director of the Institute of Training and Research in Community Health & Population Jamkhed the following year. He also received a PhD in Public Service from Gettysburg College in 1985. In the 1970s, he was a member of the Emmanuel Hospital Association of India (1976), sat on the government Task Force on Family Planning Indian Council of Medical Research (1978) and was chairman of the Voluntary Health Association of India (1978). Arole received the Ramon Magsaysay Award for Community Leadership in 1979.

In the 1980s, he held leadership roles on several committees: the executive committee of the National Institute of Health and Family Welfare (1982) and Institute of Management Development and Research (1985-1993); the High Power Committee on Vocationalization of Education in Maharashtra (1987-1990); the District Planning and Development Committee, Ahmednagar District (1988); and the standing committees of the Central Council of Health and Family Welfare, Technology Mission on Water, Health & FamiIndia and Literacy Immunization (1988). He was on the advisory panel of the Family Planning Association of India (1981) and the advisory council for the 1983 National Health Policy (1985); as well as the planning boards for Maharashtra State (1988) and Yashwantrao Chavan Maharashtra Open University (1989). Arole was on the Faculty of Medicine Senate for Pune University (1983) and was Chairman Honorary Union Health Minister for the Central Council of Health and Family Welfare (1988). He was also involved in the All India Marathi Science Congress in Pune from 1980 to 1990 and in the Evaluation Team Area Development Project (DANIDA) for the central government in 1982.

Arole was on the Senate for Poona University in 1991 and Organizing Committee for 6th Asian Congress for Agricultural Medicine And Rural Health in 1992. In the early 2000s, he was on the National Commission on Population (2000), the National Rural Health Mission's Empowered Committee (2005), the Central Council for Health and Family Welfare (2007), and the Maharashtra State Monitory Committee for Malnutrition, Deaths in children.

Arole also presented at a number of conferences, congresses and other meetings around the world throughout his career, including the Ecumenical Christian Conference (Bangkok, 1972); Christian Medical Commission Annual Meeting (Berlin, 1972); International Voluntary Service Organization (Manila, 1974); UNICEF (London, 1974); International Union of Nutrition Scientists (New Delhi, 1977); National Environmental Engineering Research Institute (Nagpur, 1977); UNICEF (Nairobi, 1980); Tata Memorial Centre (Bombay, 1980); Indian Academy of Pediatrics (Hyderabad, 1981); OECD (Paris, 1984); and World Organization of Family Doctors (London, 1985). He spoke at Lady Irwin College's Smt. Sabarwal Memorial Oration in 1986 with a presentation titled Role of Women in Nutrition and Health and at University of Poona's Shri R. S.Dubhashi Memorial Oration in 1988 with a presentation titled Health for all by the year 2000.

== Personal life ==
He died on 25 May 2011 in Pune.

== Awards and honours ==
- 1965–1970 : Fulbright Scholar
- 1966 : Paul Harrison Award for outstanding work in rural areas
- 1979 : Ramon Magsaysay Award for Community Leadership
- 1987 : N. D. Diwan Memorial Award for the rehabilitation of handicapped persons
- 1988 : NCIH Award for service in international health
- 1990 : Padma Bhushan National Award for Social Service
- 2001 : R. B. Hiwargaonkar Award 2000 for rural health service using grassroots workers as change agents
- 2003 : Diwaliben Mehta Award for Tribal Work
- 2004 : Dr. Babasaheb Ambedkar Dalit Mitra Award for work among backward classes
- 2005 : Mother Teresa Memorial National Award for Social Justice
