= Ravindra Pratap Sahi =

Three-star general in the Indian Army

Lt Gen Ravindra Pratap Sahi AVSM (b. 1956) is a military officer and an alumnus of the National Defence Academy, Khadakwasla. He served as the Chief of Staff, Central Command of the Indian Army, appointed on 26 October 2017 succeeding Lieutenant General GS Shergill.

== Biography ==
Lt General Ravindra Pratap Sahi, a graduate of the National Defence Academy (NDA) Khadakwasla, started his military service in the 6th Battalion, Brigade of The GUARDS in 1977 after his education at UP Sainik School, Lucknow. His career spans various roles in combat, staff, and command positions. He furthered his education at the Defence Services Staff College, Wellington, and honed his skills through the Higher Command Course in Mhow and the National Defence Course in Bangladesh. Lt Gen Sahi has held various roles, including Director in the operational logistics directorate at army headquarters, Brigadier General Staff of a Strike Corps, and Southern Command headquarters in Pune. He led the "Standard Presentation" parade in November 2011 in Patiala, where Standards were presented to five Armoured Regiments by the President of India. He has been associated with the 2 Corps or Kharga, one of the Army's three primary "strike" formations, which is tasked with potential operations against Pakistan in a full-scale war.

Lt. Gen. Ravindra Pratap Sahi, AVSM, took on the position of Vice Chairman of the Uttar Pradesh State Disaster Management Authority (UPSDMA) in 2018, serving until January 15, 2024. As per clause (b) of sub-section (2) of Section 14 of the Disaster Management Act, 2005, the Vice Chairperson of UPSDMA is appointed by the Chairman, who is the state's Chief Minister.
