= Satya Narayana Shastri =

Indian physician of Ayurveda and a Sanskrit scholar

- Born: Uttar Pradesh, India
- Occupation(s): Physician, scholar, academic
- Known for: Ayurveda
- Awards: 1954 Padma Bhushan

Satya Narayana Shastri was an Indian physician of Ayurveda and a Sanskrit scholar. Born in 1887 in the Indian state of Uttar Pradesh, he was the first honorary physician to Rajendra Prasad, the first president of India. He wrote the introduction of Charaka Samhita, when it was published in 1962. He served as the principal of Ayurveda College of Banaras Hindu University and Government Ayurveda College of Sampurnanand Sanskrit Vishwavidyalaya. The Government of India awarded him Padma Bhushan, the third highest Indian civilian award, in 1954.

== See also ==
- Charaka
- Sushruta Samhita
