= Comprehensive Rural Health Project =

Indian non profit non-governmental organization

The Comprehensive Rural Health Project (CRHP) is a non profit non-governmental organisation located in the Ahmednagar District of Maharashtra State in India. The organization works with rural communities to provide community-based primary healthcare and improve the general standard of living through a variety of community-led development programs, including Women's Self-Help Groups, Farmers' Clubs, Adolescent Programs, and Sanitation and Watershed Development Programs. CRHP was founded in 1970 by Dr. Raj and Dr. Mabelle Arole, who conceived the Organisation's model while on a Fulbright Scholarship in Maharashtra. The work of CRHP has been recognized by the Government of Maharashtra and UNICEF, as well as being introduced to 178 countries across the world. The purpose of CRHP is to help provide healthcare to the poor.

== History ==
=== Founders: Dr.Raj and Dr.Mabelle Arole ===
Dr.Raj and Dr.Mabelle Arole came from very different backgrounds but found unity in common purpose. Raj Arole, born in 1935, was raised in the village of Rahuri in Ahmadnagar District. In contrast, Mabelle Immanuel, born in 1935, led a secluded and secure life at the college campus where her father was a professor. Mabelle & Raj met during their studies at Jabalpur, Vellore and graduated in 1959, with Mabelle topping her class and Raj coming second. They found each other in their common purpose of serving the poor and marginalized and were married in April 1960, vowing to each other to devote their lives to this cause. Before founding CRHP in 1970, the couple worked in the Marathi Mission Hospital in Vadala from 1962-1966 and spent time in the US completing their medicine & surgery residencies, well obtaining MPH degrees at Johns Hopkins University. The idea of CRHP was born during the Aroles’ time at Johns Hopkins and was based on their prior experiences with the rural poor. they realized that they were repeatedly treating similar problems, without producing a solution to the root cause of the ailments they were seeing. With this in mind, the Aroles realized the narrow scope of curative medicine was not enough to improve the lives of their patients in a meaningful way. They decided that they needed to provide holistic care and create empowering framework that galvanized communities to come together to solve their problems sustainably. Over 40 years later, their Jamkhed Model lives on and has been regarded as the most successful template for community-based health and development the world has seen.

=== The Beginning ===
To understand the link between poverty and health, the Aroles decided to live on the same amount of money that an average village family earned, which was approximately US $7.00 per month [5]. By doing this, they realized that securing food and water was much more important for the people of Jamkhed, than the practice of good public health [6].

The Aroles reached out to donor agencies that funded food-for work programs. Citizens were employed as daily wage laborers to build dams and were paid one bag of grain per week [7]. Health and wellness lessons, and discussions of home-based, low cost prevention and care programs to enhance children’s nutrition, prevent diarrhea, and control pneumonia were provided in conjunction with these construction projects [7]. By providing basic medical care to workers and their children, the Aroles established an initial trust with the residents of Jamkhed. From there, the Aroles were able to start their mission of instituting trained health workers in the villages [1][7].

== CRHP Model ==
CRHP’s model, known in the development community as the “Jamkhed Model”, is centered around mobilizing and building the capacity of the community, empowering the people to bring about their own improvements in health and poverty-alleviation. The model has three, mutually supportive components:

1. Village Health Workers and Community Groups

The Village Health Worker (VHW), usually illiterate and of low caste, is the key change agent for CRHP’s comprehensive approach to health improvement. Selected by the communities themselves and trained by CRHP, VHWs not only act as health workers and midwives but they also mobilize their communities to achieve better sanitation, hygiene, family planning, and maternal and infant health. When a village agrees to work with CRHP, the whole village comes together to choose a woman to be trained as their VHW. VHWs initially receive extensive training on CRHP’s campus. Over half of the training time is dedicated to personal development in order to build self-esteem, confidence, and skills necessary for community organization and effective communication. The rest of the training is spent developing clinical knowledge and skills that equip the women to function as primary health care workers. The VHWs come together weekly for CRHP-based training to review skills, share stories, and update statistics.

VHWs provide basic preventive healthcare and knowledge to their villages and help organize and facilitate Women’s Groups and the Adolescent Girls Programs. VHWs also provide a great deal of care to pregnant women and new mothers. They educate women on nutrition during pregnancy and proper breastfeeding practices. In addition, they examine the pregnant women and monitor the progress of the fetus. VHWs are fully equipped to perform home deliveries and will also accompany women to a hospital delivery if they chose to do so or it is medically necessary.

2. Mobile Health Team

The Mobile Health Team (MHT) found its beginnings in the outreach efforts of founders, Mabelle and Raj Arole, and today serves as the bridge between the community and CRHP’s on-campus medical and development staff. Historically, villagers have had neither the time, nor the resources to travel all the way to the hospital in Jamkhed for care, and as a result, healthcare was brought to them. In order to build trust and confidence, the original outreach team provided curative services via weekly clinics in the villages, and as rapport was built, the original team developed into the MHT. Today the team possesses a broad array of capacities including health promotion, preventive health services, social work, development projects, and community organization.

The Mobile Health Team consists of a driver, social workers, a paramedic, and on certain occasions, a physician. However, these distinctions tend to be in name only, and all team members are trained as fully as possible in all jobs and tasks. All team members address patients’ clinical and social questions and are considered equals with each member given respect and importance. The integration of the team and skill sharing allows for flexibility and creates resiliency in our system in the face of unpredictable absences and personnel shortages. The Mobile Health Team helps train Village Health Workers and works side by side with them to provide health services to project villages. MHT members help lead and provide support for the Adolescent Boys and Girls Programs, Women’s Self-Help Groups, and Farmers’ Clubs. In addition, the MHT members work with trainees and researchers from all over the world to collect village data and educate others about the Jamkhed Model.

3. Julia Hospital

The first hospital at CRHP was created in the 1970s by Drs. Raj and Mabelle Arole to meet the need for medical services in Jamkhed and to build trust in the surrounding communities. When the Aroles first arrived in Jamkhed, they planned to stay a few years, set up a mobile hospital, remedy the health situation, and move on to another area. As the need for medical care surpassed their expectations and the number of patients increased, the need for a permanent hospital did as well. The Old Hospital, built in 1970, served Jamkhed block for 35 years. As CRHP became more involved in secondary care and conducted more surgeries, the need for an even more advanced hospital increased, and in 2009, with the help of a donor, the Julia Hospital was built for USD $1.7 million, including all equipment. The Julia Hospital has 50 beds, three operating theaters, a lab, a maternity ward, an Intensive Care Unit, an X-ray lab, a labor room, and a pharmacy. It serves a rural, underserved population of roughly 500,000 individuals.

== Impact and Outcomes ==
In the Villages:

The health workers were not accepted quickly. It took months or years for a village to start listening, and it was the dramatic decrease in both infant and child mortality rates that helped to cement the role of the village health worker. The women were also supported by a mobile team, established by CRHP. The team was composed of a nurse, paramedic, social worker, and sometimes a doctor. They would visit each village every week in the beginning, then less and less often, only treating the hardest cases. This team was created to not only tackle the most severe illnesses of the villagers, but to reinforce the authority of the Village Health Worker [2][10][11].

Village Health Workers receive intensive training from CRHP in primary health care and health promotion, including family planning, women’s and children’s health and home-birth delivery. Training is also provided in personal and community development, organization and communication skills. These workers share knowledge about health in their respective communities through discussion groups and household visits. During discussions with community members, Village Health Workers address issues such as child care, family planning (contraception use increased from less than 0.5% in 1970, to nearly 60% as on 1999), adequate birth spacing, nutrition, hygiene, sanitation and safe drinking water [9]. They are given a small medical kit and a birthing kit [7]. These women are capable of administering basic remedies and medications, performing safe deliveries, and detecting and referring high-risk pregnancies and deliveries to the CRHP hospital [12].

With the institution of these workers, there has been a significant reduction in child malnutrition, diarrhea, pneumonia, leprosy, HIV/AIDS, tuberculosis, and malaria, along with other common diseases associated with standing water from the lack of sanitation and liquid waste disposal systems [6].

Despite these improvement in health care, come problems with this health care worker model were encountered in the villages. Husbands would refuse to allow their wives to become a Village Health Worker or to receive treatment from one. Some women took their new-found sense of freedom and abandoned their husbands and families. In some cases, the Village Health Worker would illegally sell the drugs to the highest bidder or refuse to give treatment without payment. While women were chosen to be health workers through a town consensus, some villages refused to decide and would not accept the new model. In addition, not all women were able to travel to the Jamkhed facility for training. Often, the young woman’s town would be too far away and there would be no bus available. During the monsoon season, very few women could reach the facility at all [7].

Maternal and Child care:

Superstition was one of the first obstacles the Village Health Workers had to face. Infant and maternal mortality, along with many other diseases, increased because of such beliefs. To villagers in the Jamkhed area, disease came from the gods [2].

If a new mother died in childbirth, the child was then killed. Villagers saw the mother as unclean, and the child, therefore, unclean. Many cases of maternal death resulted from infections by dirty instruments during the delivery. CRHP trained the Village Health Workers particularly in the methods pregnancy care, such as monitoring blood-pressure and checking for anemia, and in safe and hygienic childbirth. There were other widely accepted superstitions surrounding basic nutrition for pregnant women. They were told not to eat very much, and new mothers would wait several days before starting to breastfeed [2].

The effect of CRHP on childhood mortality, measured from September 1992 to December 2007, showed a 30% reduction in the hazard of child death after the neonatal period for CRHP villages, as compared with villages in the control area. The reduction was significant at the 5% level [12]. Since its conception, CRHP reduced the infant mortality rate from over 200/1000 to approximately 20/1000 (less than half of the figure for the rural area of the state of Maharashtra), with 95% being “safe deliveries” out of the 79% (data for 1999-2003) of home deliveries [2][6][13]. A research project to measure malnutrition and illness among children under five in fifteen CRHP villages, conducted from October to December 2002, showed that malnutrition was less than 15%, while the average for India is greater than 50%. Immunization rates were 99% for measles, DPT, and OPV vaccinations in CRHP villages [14].

Empowering Women:

The Aroles believed that preventative medicine begins by identifying the root of the problem. Gender inequality was one of the first major targets CRHP wanted to attack [7]. Most female villagers were married before the age of 10, started having children before 14, were beaten by their husbands (according to a 1996 UNICEF survey, up to 45% of men in India acknowledged physically abusing their wives), and eventually abandoned by them [2][11].

In each village, the Aroles asked the Village Health Worker to form an Adolescent Girls Program. The program teaches girls, ages 12–18, health education and personal development, and self-defense, and fosters discussion and creative activities in order to promote self-esteem and a sense of empowerment [15]. As a result, more women are postponing marriage until 18, the use of contraception and voluntary hysterectomies have reduced family size, and more girls are attending school [2].

Additionally, CRHP helps village women to receive micro-credit loans from local banks and provides them a means to become economically independent. The loans allow the women to earn their own living, generally by selling vegetables or raising farm animals [9].

The Aroles chose young women as Village Health Workers to begin the process of breaking down gender inequality, but contributing factors are still heavily present—socioeconomic class, son preference, early marriage and pregnancy, and violence. Qualitative research of Jamkhed’s surrounding area has supported the success of these programs. Adolescent Girl Program members are seen to have more knowledge about nutrition, reproductive health, maternal health, hygiene, and sanitation, and are found to have healthier weights and other health indicators, as compared to non-members [3][8][15].

A 2010 study used qualitative methods and surveyed 18 Village Health Workers and found 6 themes consistent with a successful approach to empowering women. These included trusted sources of knowledge, effective learning methods and environment(s), qualities of effective Village Health Workers, defeating stigma, empowerment through critical assessment and community organizing, and motivation to serve [16].

== Awards ==
2011 Times of India Social Impact Award, Category: Health- NGO

2010 Gordon-Wyon Award for Excellence in Community-Oriented Public Health, Epidemiology and Practice

2005 Mother Teresa Memorial National Award for Social Justice

2004 Dr. Babasaheb Ambedkar Dalit Mitra Award for work among marginalized classes

2003 Diwaliben Mehta Award for Tribal Work

2001 Schwab Foundation Social Entrepreneur Award

2001 National Award for Work among Tribal People

2000 R.B. Hiwargaonkar Award for rural health service using Grassroots workers as Change Agents

1990 Padma Bhushan Award for Social Service

1988 National Council of International Health (now known as the Global Health Council) Award

1979 Ramon Magsaysay Award for Community Leadership

1966 Paul Harrison Award for outstanding work in rural areas

== Publications ==
In 1989, the Aroles received a grant for two years to write a book about their experiences. Jamkhed, published in 1994, chronicles the work of CRHP from its inception. It has become a classic read for students and practitioners in the field of public health.
