= Mabelle Arole =

Indian health activist (1935–1999)

Mabelle Arole, born 26 December 1935 in Jabalpur, Madhya Pradesh, India, is a recipient of the Ramon Magsaysay Award for community leadership with her husband, Raj Arole, for their Comprehensive Rural Health Project.

== Early life ==
Arole was the second of three children of Rajappan D. Immanuel, a professor of New Testament Greek at Jabalpur's theological seminary, and Beatrice Gunaratnampillai. Her parents were first cousins and third-generation Methodists. Mabelle married Rajinikant Arole.

== Work ==
Mabelle met Rajanikant Arole at the Christian Medical College in Vellore, from which they graduated in 1959 with honors. Married on 26 April 1960, they vowed to devote their lives to caring for the marginalized in rural areas. The Aroles worked at a mission hospital in Vadala, 320 kilometers east of Mumbai, from 1962 to 1966. They then spent four years in the United States on a Fulbright Scholarship to obtain residency training in medicine and surgery and a Masters in Public Health at Johns Hopkins University. Under the tutelage of Carl Taylor, a leader in the field of community health, the Aroles conceived of CRHP to provide community-based primary health care and development to poor and marginalized communities in rural India.

Returning to India after their studies, the Aroles decided to work in Jamkhed: a poor, drought-prone taluka. Village leaders invited the Aroles to speak about their project. The visit was successful, and the Aroles founded CRHP in August 1970. Its initial coverage was eight villages, with a total population of 10,000.

In the project's first 25 years, it expanded to serve over 250,000 people. At its peak, CRHP worked with 178 villages. Outcomes were dramatic, with infant mortality dropping from over 176 per 1,000 births to 23. Other data also indicated substantial health improvements in the project villages: full antenatal care for pregnant women and a child-malnutrition rate of less than one percent.

Over 40 years, CRHP has worked with 300 villages and over 500,000 people. The project is estimated to indirectly impact over one million people.

== Death ==
Mabelle Arole died in 1999. She and Rajanikant are survived by their children, Ravi and Shobha.

== Book ==
In 1989, the Aroles received a two-year grant to write a book about their experiences. Jamkhed: A Comprehensive Rural Health Project, published in 1994, chronicles the CRHP from its inception.
