= Lalit Mohan Banerjee =

Indian surgeon

- Born: West Bengal, India
- Occupation: Surgeon
- Known for: Medical academics
- Awards: Padma Bhushan

Lalit Mohan Banerjee was an Indian surgeon, medical academic and the first medical professional to receive the degree of Master of Surgery from the University of Calcutta. He was a professor of surgery at R. G. Kar Medical College and Hospital of the Calcutta University and the personal surgeon to the President of India. He was one of the founders of the Association of Surgeons of India and was its third president (1941–1942). It was during this period, he had an opportunity to operate on Rabindranath Tagore, the renowned poet and Nobel Laureate. The Government of India awarded him the third highest civilian honour of the Padma Bhushan, in 1955, for his contributions to medical science. A road in Sodepur has been named after him as Dr. L. M. Banerjee Road.
