= Sunder Das Khungar =

Indian civil servant

- Born: India
- Occupations: Civil engineer Civil servant
- Known for: Bhakra Dam; Khungar Commission
- Awards: Padma Bhushan

Sunder Das Khungar was an Indian civil servant, civil engineer and the general manager of the Bhakra Dam project. It was his proposal that the dam, originally built for irrigation, to be utilized for power generation by incorporating five hydro electric generation units. He headed the commission set up by the Ministry of Irrigation and Power in 1960 to look into the water management operations of the Damodar Valley Corporation. The Government of India awarded him the third highest civilian honour of the Padma Bhushan, in 1955, for his contributions to civil service.

== See also ==
- Bhakra Dam
- Damodar Valley Corporation
