= Muthu Krishna Mani =

- Born: Tamil Nadu, India
- Occupation: Nephrologist
- Known for: therapeutics of renal disorders
- Awards: 1991 Padma Bhushan; Dhanvantari Award; Ravindranath Tagore Award

Muthu Krishna Mani is an Indian nephrologist and a pioneer of nephrology in India. He is a former chief of nephrology department at Apollo Hospital, Chennai and is best known for treating Jayaprakash Narayan when the latter developed a renal disorder. The Government of India awarded him the Padma Bhushan, the third highest civilian award, in 1991. He is also a recipient of the Dhanvantari Award (2011) and the Ravindranath Tagore Award. He has published over 125 medical papers (Note: Please see Selected bibliography section and external links) and the orations delivered by him include the 2018 Dr. Pathros Matthai Memorial Oration of the Indian Society of Nephrology (southern chapter - ISNSC).

== Bibliography ==
- Ganesan, Muthusamy V.; Annigeri, Rajeev A.; Shankar, Bhuvaneswari; Rao, Budithi Subba; Prakash, Kowdle C.; Seshadri, Rajagopalan; Mani, Muthu Krishna (2009). "The Protein Equivalent of Nitrogen Appearance in Critically Ill Acute Renal Failure Patients Undergoing Continuous Renal Replacement Therapy". Journal of Renal Nutrition. 19 (2): 161–166. doi:10.1053/j.jrn.2008.11.009. ISSN 1051-2276. PMID 19218043.
- Mani, Muthu Krishna (2005). "Experience with a program for prevention of chronic renal failure in India". Kidney International. 67 (94): S75–S78. doi:10.1111/j.1523-1755.2005.09419.x. ISSN 0085-2538. PMID 15752246.
- Mani, Muthu Krishna (1998). "The Management of End-Stage Renal Disease in India". Artificial Organs. 22 (3): 182–186. doi:10.1046/j.1525-1594.1998.06070.x. ISSN 0160-564X. PMID 9527276.
