= Subhash Chandra Bose Aapda Prabandhan Puraskar =

Indian Award

- Awarded for: Excellent work in Disaster Management
- Sponsored by: Government of India
- Location: New Delhi, India
- Country: India
- Rewards: Institution: Cash prize of ₹51 lakh (US$54,000) and a certificate Individual: Cash prize of ₹5 lakh (US$5,300) and a certificate
- First award: 2019
- Final award: 2025
- Website: dmawards.ndma.gov.in

Subhash Chandra Bose Aapda Prabandhan Puraskar (Hindi: सुभाष चंद्र बोस आपदा प्रबंधन पुरस्कार, lit. 'Subhas Chandra Bose Disaster Management Award') is an Indian National Award for disaster management those who served selfless service for the country. Every individuals and organisations awarded by the Government Of India on every year on January 23, the birth anniversary of freedom fighter Netaji Subhash Chandra Bose.

Gujarat Institute of Disaster Management (GIDM) selected in Institutional Category and Vice Chairman of Sikkim State Disaster Management Authority's, Vinod Sharma have been selected in Individual Category for the Subhash Chandra Bose Aapda Prabandhan Puraskar 2022 for his strategic work in disaster management.

== History ==
The award was instituted on the 125th birth anniversary of Netaji Subhash Chandra Bose to recognise and honour the invaluable contribution and selfless service rendered by individuals and organisations in India in the field of disaster management. According to the Ministry of Home Affairs statement, Gujarat Institute of Disaster Management (GIDM) and Professor Vinod Sharma was honoured “for their excellent work and Those who were selected in 2019, 2020 and 2021 also received the award on the birth ceremony of Subhas Chandra Bose on Sunday 23 January 2022 By Prime Minister of India Narendra Modi.

== Awardees ==
Details of Subhash Chandra Bose Aapda Prabandhan Award are as given below:

Year	Recipient		Ref(s)
Year	Individual	Institution	Ref(s)
2019	—	8th Bn National Disaster Response Force, Ghaziabad	
2020	Shri Kumar Munnan Singh	Disaster Mitigation & Management Centre, Uttarakhand	
2021	Dr. Rajendra Kumar Bhandari	Sustainable Environment and Ecological Development Society (SEEDS)	
2022	Prof. Vinod Sharma	Gujarat Institute of Disaster Management (GIDM)	
2023	—	Odisha State Disaster Management Authority (OSDMA) and Lunglei Fire Station (LFS), Mijoram.	
2024	–	60 Parachute Field Hospital, Uttar Pradesh	
2025	--	Indian National Centre for Ocean Information Services (INCOIS)	

== See also ==
- Orders, decorations, and medals of India
