= Disaster Management Act, 2005 =

Act of Parliament of India

Parliament of India
- Long title: An Act to provide for the effective management of disasters and for matters connected therewith or incidental thereto.
- Citation: Act No. 53 of 2005
- Territorial extent: whole of India
- Passed by: Rajya Sabha
- Passed: 28 November 2005
- Passed by: Lok Sabha
- Passed: 12 December 2005
- Assented to by: President A. P. J. Abdul Kalam
- Assented to: 23 December 2005
- Commenced: Parts of this act commenced on various dates, 28 July 2006; 1 August 2007; 17 March 2008; 18 October 2011; 5 February 2021

Legislative history

Initiating chamber: Rajya Sabha
- Bill title: Disaster Management Bill, 2005
- Introduced by: Home Minister Shivraj Patil
- Introduced: 11 May 2005
- Parliamentary Standing Committee report: 25 August 2005
- Passed: 28 November 2005

Revising chamber: Lok Sabha
- Received from the Rajya Sabha: 9 December 2005
- Member(s) in charge: Home Minister Shivraj Patil
- Passed: 12 December 2005

Amended by
- Disaster Management (Amendment) Act, 2025 (10 of 2025); Repealing and Amending Act, 2025 (37 of 2025)
- Status: In force (amended)

The Disaster Management Act, 2005 (Act No. 53 of 2005), was passed by the Rajya Sabha, the upper house of the Parliament of India on 28 November, and the Lok Sabha, the lower house of the Parliament, on 12 December 2005. It received the assent of The President of India on 23 December 2005. The Disaster Management Act, 2005 has 11 chapters and 79 sections. The Act extends to the whole of India.

== National Authority ==
The Act calls for the establishment of National Disaster Management Authority (NDMA), with the Prime Minister of India as chairperson. The NDMA may have no more than nine members including a Vice-Chairperson. The tenure of the members of the NDMA shall be five years. The NDMA which was initially established on 30 May 2005 by an executive order, was constituted under Section-3(1) of the Disaster Management Act, on 27 September 2006. The NDMA is responsible for "laying down the policies, plans and guidelines for disaster management" and to ensure "timely and effective response to disaster". Under section 6 of the Act it is responsible for laying "down guidelines to be followed by the State Authorities in drawing up the State Plans".

== National Executive Committee ==
The Act under Section 8 enjoins the Central Government to Constitute a National Executive Committee (NEC) to assist the National Authority. The NEC is composed of Secretary level officers of the Government of India in the Ministries of home, agriculture, atomic energy, defence, drinking water supply, environment and forests, finance (expenditure), health, power, rural development, science and technology, space, telecommunication, urban development, and water resources, with the Home secretary serving as the Chairperson, ex officio. The Chief of the Integrated Defence Staff of the Chiefs of Staff Committee, is an ex officio member of the NEC. The NEC under section of the Act is responsible for the preparation of the National Disaster Management Plan for the whole country and to ensure that it is "reviewed and updated annually".

== State Disaster Management Authority ==
All State Governments are mandated under Section 14 of the act to establish a State Disaster Management Authority (SDMA). The SDMA consists of the Chief Minister of the State, who is the Chairperson, and no more than eight members appointed by the Chief Minister. State Executive Committee is responsible (Section 22) for drawing up the state disaster management plan, and implementing the National Plan. The SDMA is mandated under section 28 to ensure that all the departments of the State prepare disaster management plans as prescribed by the National and State Authorities.

== District Disaster Management Authority ==
The Chairperson of District Disaster Management Authority (DDMA) will be the Collector or District Magistrate or Deputy Commissioner of the district. The elected representative of the area is member of the DDMA as an ex officio co-Chairperson, (Section 25).

== National Disaster Response Force (NDRF) ==
The Section 44–45 of the Act provides for constituting a National Disaster Response Force "for the purpose of specialist response to a threatening disaster situation or disaster" under a Director General to be appointed by the Central Government. In September 2014 Kashmir-floods NDRF along with the armed forces played a vital role in rescuing the locals and tourists. On 23 January 2022 on the occasion of Netaji Subhas Chandra Bose 125th anniversary, National Disaster Response Force (NDRF), 8th battalion awarded for Subhash Chandra Bose Aapda Prabandhan Puraskar.

== Other Provisions of the Act ==
Section 42 of the Act calls for establishing a National Institute of Disaster Management.Section 46-50, mandates the funds for Disaster Mitigation at various levels. The Act provides for civil and criminal liabilities for those who violate the provision of the Act.

== Implementation of the Act ==
The implementation of the National Disaster Act, 2005 has been slow, and slack. On 22 July 2013 Indian Supreme Court Justices A K Patnaik and M Y Eqbal in response to a Public Interest Litigation issued notices to the Governments of Uttarakhand, Tamil Nadu, Odisha, Andhra Pradesh, Gujarat, Rajasthan, Maharashtra and the Central government for alleged failure to implement the Disaster Management Act, 2005. The petitioner alleged that the non-implementation of the Disaster Management Act by the Government of Uttarakhand endangered the lives of citizens. He sought "reasonable ex-gratia assistance on account of loss of life, damage to houses and for restoration of means of livelihood to victims of flash floods in Uttarakhand under the Disaster Management Act".

== Criticism of the Act ==
The act has been criticized for marginalizing Non-governmental organizations (NGOs), elected local representatives, local communities and civic group; and for fostering a hierarchical, bureaucratic, command and control, 'top down', approach that gives the central, state, and district authorities sweeping powers. It is also alleged that the "Act became a law almost at the will of the bureaucrats who framed it."

== Disaster Management (Amendment) Act, 2025 ==
Union Minister of State for Home Nityanand Rai on Thursday introduced the Disaster Management (Amendment) Bill, 2024 in the Lok Sabha on 1 August 2024 to create disaster database and also look at urban disaster and development.It was passed by Lok Sabha on 12 December 2024 and Rajya Sabha on 25 March 2025.It was published officially in The Gazette on March 29,2025.
