= Orders, decorations, and medals of India =

Honour system in India
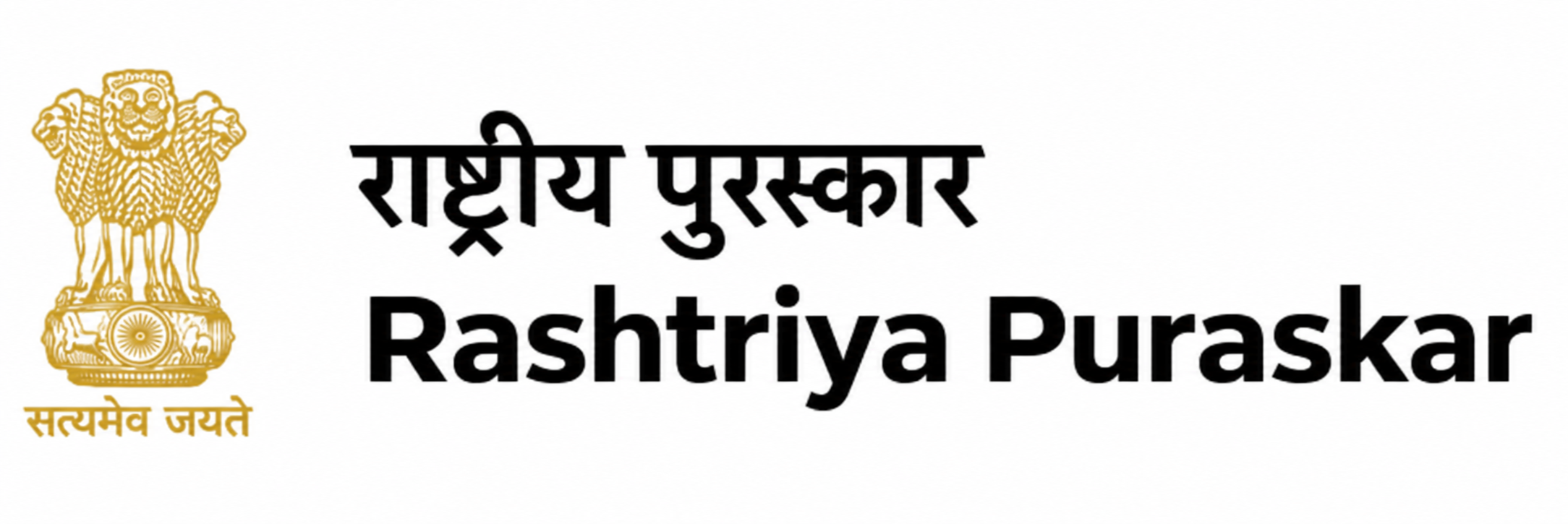
- Central Awards Support Unit, Ministry of Home Affairs, Government of India.
- Type: National civilian
- Country: India
- Website: awards.gov.in
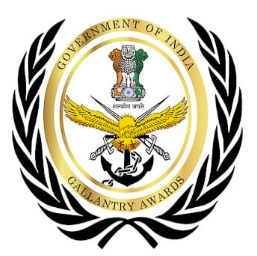
- Gallantry Awards, Ministry of Defence, Government of India.

The Indian honours system is the system of awards given to individuals for a variety of services to the Republic of India. The categories of awards are as follows:

== Civilian awards ==
=== Bharat Ratna ===
Bharat Ratna ('Jewel of India'), the highest civilian award of India, was instituted in 1954. Any person without distinction of race, occupation, position, gender or religion is eligible for this award. It is awarded in recognition of exceptional service or performance of the highest order in any field of human endeavour. On conferment of the award, the recipient receives a sanad (certificate) signed by the President and a medallion.

=== Padma awards ===
. Except for brief interruptions during the years 1978 to 1979 and 1993 to 1997, these awards have been announced every year on Republic Day. The award is given in three categories: Padma Vibhushan, Padma Bhushan and Padma Shri, in decreasing order of precedence.

- Padma Vibhushan is awarded for "exceptional and distinguished service". The Padma Vibhushan ('Great Lotus Decoration') is the second-highest civilian award in India.
- Padma Bhushan is awarded for "distinguished service of a high order". The Padma Bhushan ('Lotus Decoration') is the third-highest civilian award in India.
- Padma Shri is awarded for "distinguished service". The Padma Shri ('Noble Lotus') is the fourth-highest civilian award in India.

Unlike national honours, the Padma awards do not include cash allowances, benefits, or special concessions in rail/air travel. The Supreme Court of India, Balaji Raghavan v. Union of India, (1996) while the Bharat Ratna and the Padma awards do not come under the definition of "titles" under Article 18 of Fundamental Rights in India, no titles or honorifics are associated with the Bharat Ratna or any of the Padma awards; awardees cannot use them or their initials as suffixes, prefixes or pre- and post-nominals attached to the awardee's name. This includes any such use on letterheads, invitation cards, posters, books etc. In the case of any misuse, the awardee will forfeit the award, and he or she is cautioned against any such misuse upon receiving the honour.

- The decoration comprises a sanad issued under the hand and seal of the President and a medal.
- The recipients are also given a replica of the medal, which they can wear during any ceremonial/State functions etc., if they desire.
- A commemorative brochure giving out brief details in respect of each award winner is also released on the day of the investiture ceremony.

==== Selection process ====
These awards seek to recognize work of any distinction, and is given for distinguished and exceptional achievements/service in all fields of activities/disciplines, such as art, literature and education, sports, medicine, social work, science and engineering, public affairs, civil service, trade and industry, etc. All persons without distinction of race, occupation, position or sex are eligible for these awards.

In 2015, the government decided to end the practice of ministers recommending names for Padma awards and replaced it with any Indian citizen recommending a person for Padma awards online. The government said that this was done with the belief that every citizen has something to contribute to the nation and that contribution should be integrated with the country's growth. Accordingly, several hitherto unknown citizens were awarded Padma awards in 2017. The role of the state governments was also minimised.

==== Annulment of awards ====
While there are no specific criteria for withdrawing a Padma award, the President of India, per the awards' statutes, may cancel and annul any award in the case of any misconduct committed by the recipient. At least three awards of the Padma Shri have been so annulled, twice in 1958 for recipients residing in the state of Punjab and once in 1974 for a recipient residing in the state of Gujarat.

== Military awards ==
Since 11 July 2019, the Indian Army allows close relatives of deceased military personnel to wear their medals on the right side of the chest while attending homage ceremonies at war memorials, cemeteries and funerals.

=== Wartime gallantry awards ===
Established on 26 January 1950 with retrospective effect from 15 August 1947.

- Param Vir Chakra – Highest-military award in India. Awarded for national bravery in the presence of the enemy. This is the equivalent of the Victoria Cross, which was last conferred on Indians in World War II.
- Maha Vir Chakra – Maha Vir Chakra is the second-highest military decoration in India and is awarded for acts of conspicuous gallantry in the presence of the enemy, whether on land, at sea or in the air.
- Vir Chakra – Third in precedence in the awards for wartime gallantry.

=== Peacetime gallantry awards ===
- Ashoka Chakra
- Kirti Chakra
- Shaurya Chakra

These awards were instituted on 4 January 1952. These awards were renamed on 27 January 1967 as Ashoka Chakra, Kirti Chakra and Shaurya Chakra from Ashoka Chakra (Class I), Ashoka Chakra (Class II) and Ashoka Chakra (Class III) respectively.

=== Wartime/peacetime service awards ===
- Sena Medal (Army)
- Nau Sena Medal (Navy)
- Vayu Sena Medal (Air Force)
- Tatrakshak Medal ( Coast Guard)

=== Wartime distinguished awards ===
- Sarvottam Yudh Seva Medal
- Uttam Yudh Seva Medal
- Yudh Seva Medal

=== Peacetime distinguished awards ===
- Param Vishisht Seva Medal
- Ati Vishisht Seva Medal
- Vishisht Seva Medal

== Police and civil forces awards ==
=== Gallantry awards ===
- President's Medal for Gallantry
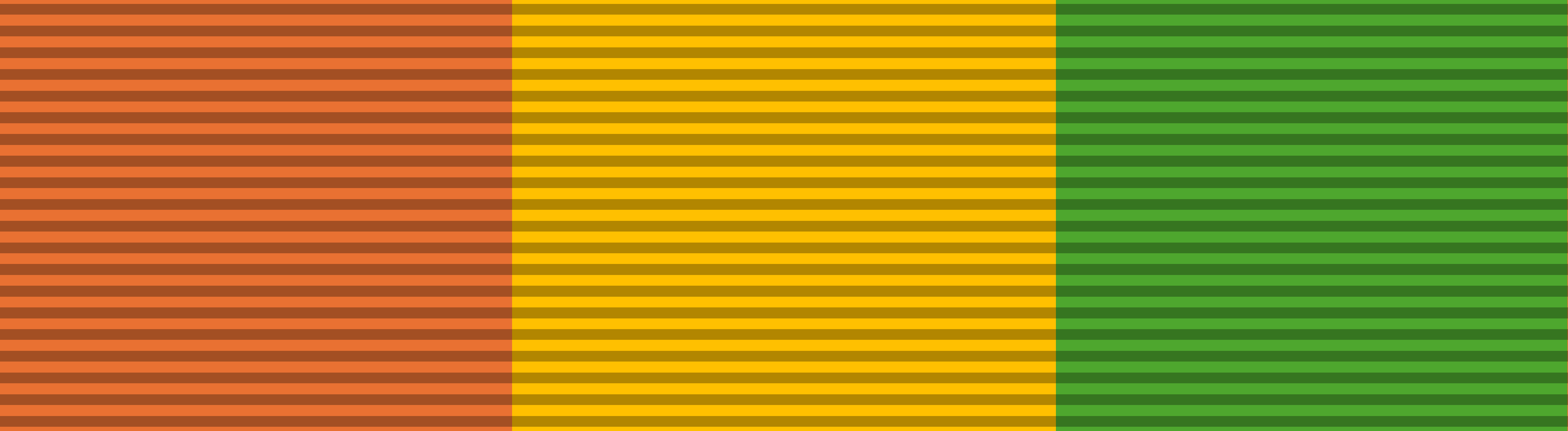
- Medal for Gallantry

=== Service awards ===
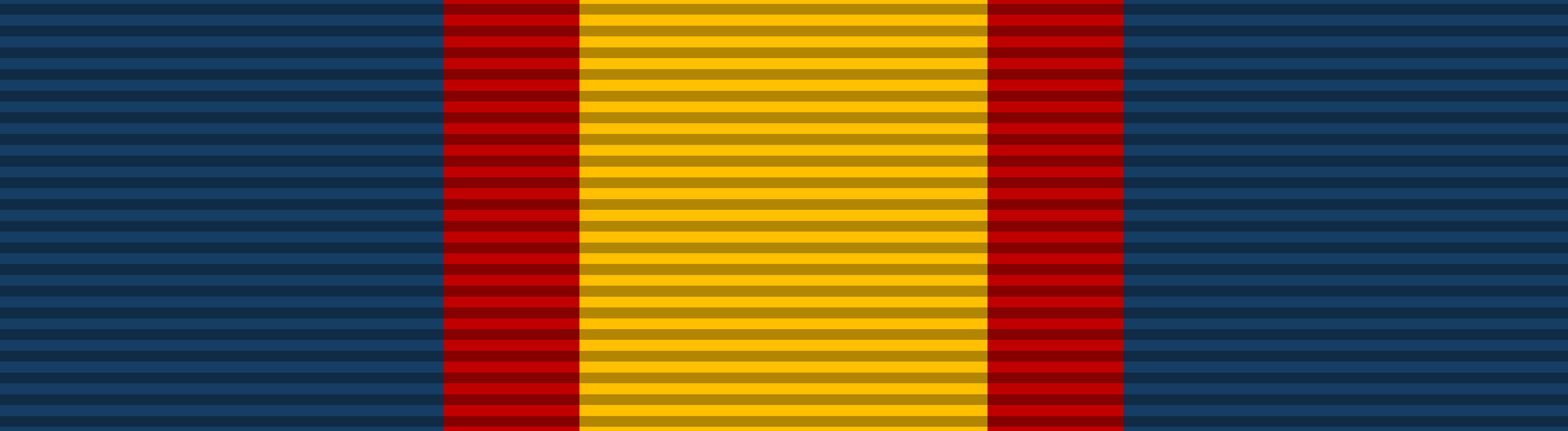
- President's Medal for Distinguished Service
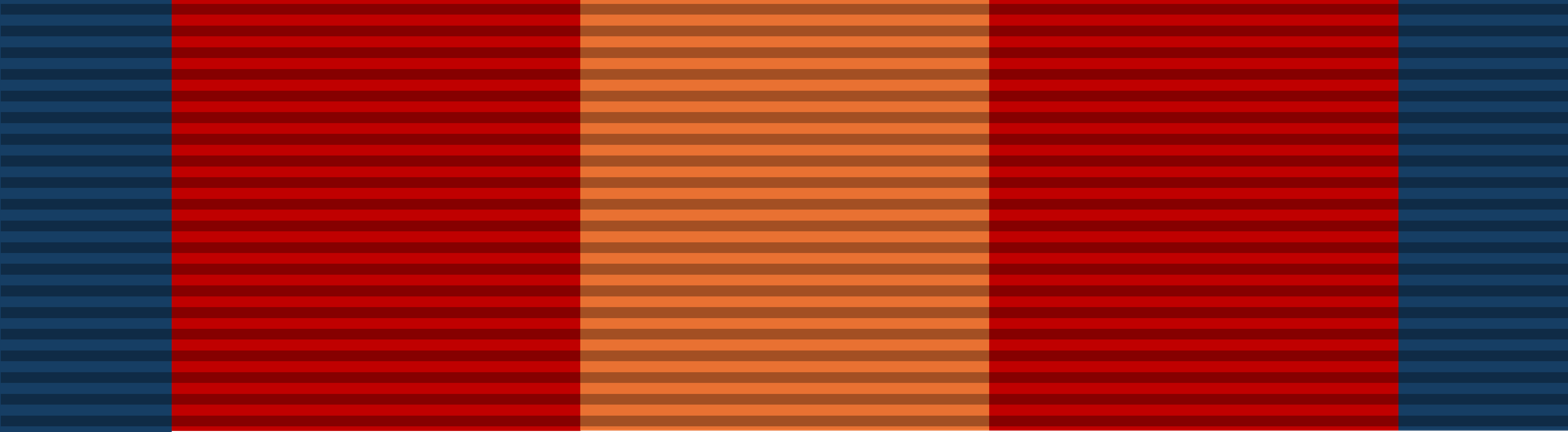
- Medal for Meritorious Service
- Kendriya Grihamantri Dakshata Padak
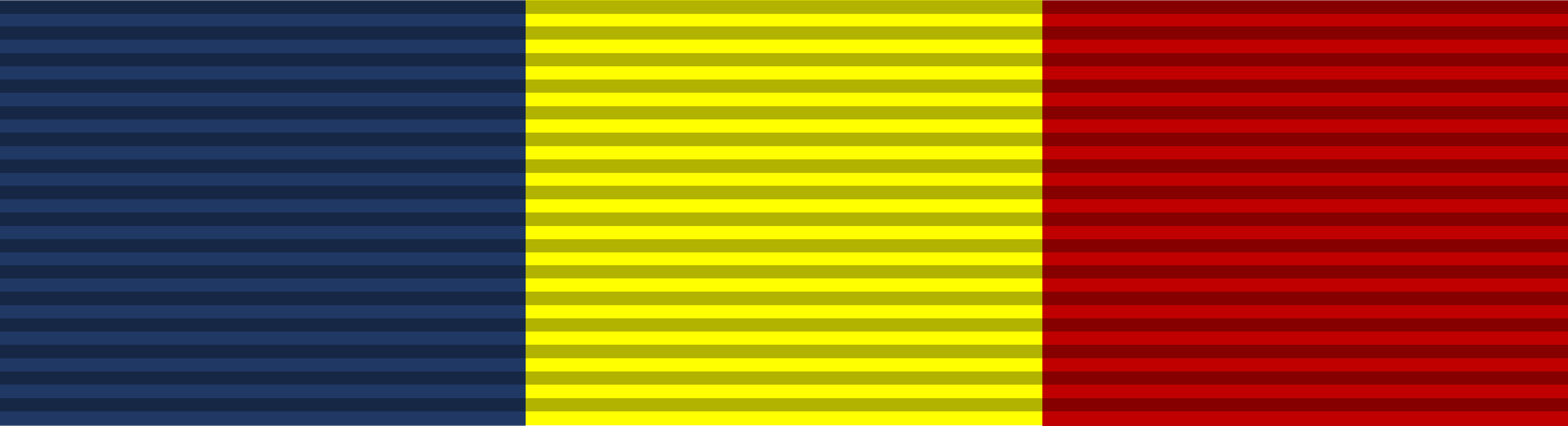
- Ati Utkrisht Seva Padak
- Utkrisht Seva Padak

=== Coast Guard awards ===
- President's Tatrakshak Medal for Gallantry
- Tatrakshak Medal for Gallantry
- President's Tatrakshak Medal for Distinguished Service
- Tatrakshak Medal for Meritorious Service

== Other national awards ==
- Prime Minister's Award for Excellence in Public Administration is awarded to acknowledge, recognize and reward the extraordinary and innovative work done by the Indian Civil Servants.
- Subhash Chandra Bose Aapda Prabandhan Puraskar is an Indian National Award for disaster management those who served selfless service for the country.
- Sardar Patel National Unity Award is awarded to persons who make contributions to promote national unity and integrity.
- Champions of Change by Swachh Bharat Mission and NITI Aayog

=== Women ===
- Nari Shakti Puraskar. It was instituted in 1999 under the title of Stree Shakti Puraskar by the Government of India.

=== Children ===
- Pradhan Mantri Rashtriya Bal Puraskar (previously National Children's Award for Exceptional Achievement)
- National Bal Shree Honour

== Science and technology awards ==
- Vigyan Ratna Award
- Rashtriya Vigyan Puraskar
- Shanti Swarup Bhatnagar Prize for Science and Technology

== Medicine awards ==
- Dr. B. C. Roy Award – Highest award in the field of medicine. Instituted by the Medical Council of India, presented by the President of India. Instituted in 1962 by the Government of India.

== Literature awards ==
- Jnanpith Award is the highest literary honour in literature of India
- Moortidevi Award
- Sahitya Akademi Award
- Sahitya Akademi Fellowship
- Saraswati Samman
- Vyas Samman
- Yuva Puraskar
- Bhasha Samman
- Sahitya Akademi Translation Prize
- Ananda Coomarswamy Fellowship
- Premchand Fellowship

== Sports awards ==
- National Sports Awards
  - Khel Ratna Award
  - Arjuna Award
  - Dhyan Chand Award
  - Dronacharya Award
  - Maulana Abul Kalam Azad Trophy
  - Rashtriya Khel Protsahan Puraskar

== Adventure awards ==
- Tenzing Norgay National Adventure Award

== Cinema and arts ==
- National Film Awards by National Film Development Corporation of India
- Dadasaheb Phalke Award by National Film Development Corporation of India

== Performing arts ==
Sangeet Natak Akademi is the national academy for music, dance, and drama, and is considered the apex body for performing arts in India.

- Sangeet Natak Akademi Award
- Sangeet Natak Akademi Fellowship
- Ustad Bismillah Khan Yuva Puraskar

== Particular awards ==
=== Bravery ===
- National Bravery Award
  - Bharat Award
  - Sanjay Chopra Award
  - Geeta Chopra Award
  - Kritin Bhardwaj Award
  - Bapu Gaidhani Award
- Jeevan Raksha Padak Series of Awards
  - Sarvottam Jeevan Raksha Padak
  - Uttam Jeevan Raksha Padak
  - Jeevan Raksha Padak

=== Corporate Awards ===
National Corporate Social Responsibility Awards are given by the President of India. These awards have been instituted by the Ministry of Corporate Affairs. Awards are given in 20 different sub-categories.

=== Overseas Indian Awards ===
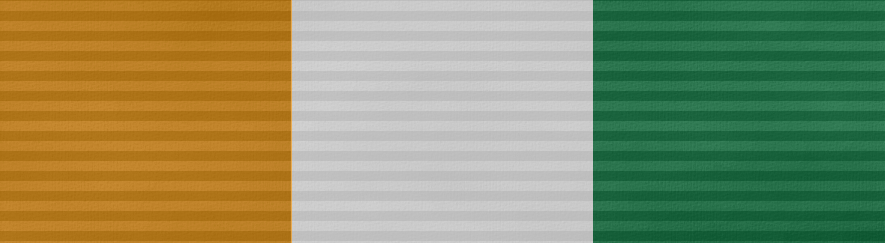
Pravasi Bharatiya Samman is awarded to Overseas Indians for excellence.

== See also ==
- Orders, decorations, and medals of British India
- List of people who have declined or renounced Indian honours and decorations
