= Asha Devi Aryanayakam =

Indian freedom fighter, educationist and gandhian

- Born: 1901; Lahore, British India
- Died: 1972 (aged 70–71)
- Spouse: E. R. W. Aranyakam
- Parent(s): Phani Bhushan Adhikari; Sarjubala Devi
- Awards: Padma Shri (1954)

Asha Devi Aryanayakam (1901–1972) was an Indian freedom fighter, educationist and gandhian. She was closely connected with Sevagram of Mahatma Gandhi and the Bhoodan movement of Vinoba Bhave.

== Biography ==
She was born in 1901, in Lahore of the erstwhile British India and the present day Pakistan to Phani Bhushan Adhikari, a professor, and Sarjubala Devi and spent her childhood in Lahore and later in Banares. She did her schooling and college studies at home and secured MA after which joined the Women's College, Benares as a member of the faculty. Later, she took up the responsibility of looking after the girls at Shantiniketan and moved to the campus where she met E. R. W. Aranyakam, a Sri Lankan who worked as the private secretary to Rabindranath Tagore and married him. The couple had two children. It was during this time, she was influenced by Mohandas Karamchand Gandhi and she, along with her husband, joined him in Sevagram in Wardha. Initially she worked at the Marwadi Vidyalaya but later took up the ideals of Nai Talim and worked at Hindustani Talimi Sangh. The Government of India honoured her in 1954, with the award of Padma Shri, the fourth highest Indian civilian award for her contributions to the society, placing her among the first recipients of the award.

Asha Devi Aryanyakam published two works, The Teacher: Gandhi and Shanti-Sena: die indische Friedenswehr, both related Mahatma Gandhi. She died in 1972.
