= Department of Fisheries =

Department of Fisheries may refer to:

- Department of Fisheries (Bangladesh)
- Department of Fisheries (Brunei)
- Department of Fisheries (New Brunswick), Canada
- Department of Fisheries (Thailand)
- Department of Fisheries (Western Australia)
