= Sardar Patel National Unity Award =

- Type: National Civilian
- Country: (India)
- Presented by: President of India
- Established: 2019

The Sardar Patel National Unity Award is an award by Ministry of Home Affairs, Government of India. The award is to recognise Indian citizens who have contributed towards promoting the national unity and integrity of India. This award is scheduled to be announced on 31 October 2021, National Unity Day in India - which is also Sardar Patel's birthday

== Background ==
Sardar Patel played an important role in uniting the provinces at the time of India's independence. Patel is remembered for the integrity and unity of the country. In 2019 modi government announced this award to recognise the extraordinary contributions towards the unity and integrity of the country.

== Award Committee ==
The recipients of the award will be selected by the award committee which includes:

- the Prime Minister
- Cabinet Secretary
- Secretary to the President
- Home Secretary

also, three or four members will be selected by Prime Minister for the award committee.
