= List of ministries of India =

The Government of India exercises its executive authority through several government ministries or departments of state. A ministry is composed of employed officials, known as civil servants, and is politically accountable through a minister. Most major ministries are headed by a Cabinet Minister, who sits in the Union Council of Ministers, and is typically supported by a team of junior ministers called the Ministers of State. A union minister is also known as a cabinet minister.

Some ministries have subdivisions called departments. For example, the Ministry of Communications has two departments - the Department of Telecommunications and the Department of Posts.

== Current Office and Ministries ==
There are 53 Union ministries and 52 departments(including 2 independent departments) in India.

Office	Established	Prime Minister	Minister of State
Prime Minister's Office	1977	Narendra Modi	Jitendra Singh

Ministry	Established	Cabinet Minister	Minister of State (Independent Charge)	Minister of State
Agriculture and Farmers' Welfare	1947	Shivraj Singh Chouhan	—N/a	Bhagirath Choudhary; Ram Nath Thakur
Ayush	2014	—N/a	Prataprao Jadhav	—N/a
Chemicals and Fertilizers	1991	J. P. Nadda	—N/a	Anupriya Patel
Civil Aviation	1947	Kinjarapu Ram Mohan Naidu	—N/a	Murlidhar Kisan Mohol
Coal	1973	G. Kishan Reddy	—N/a	Satish Chandra Dubey
Commerce and Industry	1947	Piyush Goyal	—N/a	Jitin Prasada
Communications	2016	Jyotiraditya Scindia	—N/a	Chandra Sekhar Pemmasani
Consumer Affairs, Food and Public Distribution	1946	Pralhad Joshi	—N/a	Nimuben Bambhaniya; Banwari Lal Verma
Co-operation	2021	Amit Shah	—N/a	Krishan Pal Gurjar; Murlidhar Mohol
Corporate Affairs	2003	Nirmala Sitharaman	—N/a	Harsh Malhotra
Culture	1999	Gajendra Singh Shekhawat	—N/a	Rao Inderjit Singh
Defence	1947	Rajnath Singh	—N/a	Sanjay Seth
Development of North Eastern Region	2003	Jyotiraditya Scindia	—N/a	Sukanta Majumdar
Earth Sciences	2006	—N/a	Dr. Jitendra Singh	—N/a
Education	1947	Pralhad Joshi	—N/a	Sukanta Majumdar; Jayant Chaudhary
Electronics and Information Technology	2016	Ashwini Vaishnaw	—N/a	
Environment, Forests and Climate Change	1985	Bhupender Yadav	—N/a	
External Affairs	1946	S. Jaishankar	—N/a	
Finance	1946	Nirmala Sitharaman	—N/a	
Fisheries, Animal Husbandry and Dairying	2019	Lalan Singh	—N/a	
Food Processing Industries	1988	Chirag Paswan	—N/a	
Health and Family Welfare	1947	J. P. Nadda	—N/a	
Heavy Industries	2021	H. D. Kumaraswamy	—N/a	
Home Affairs	1947	Amit Shah	—N/a	
Housing and Urban Affairs	2017	Manohar Lal Khattar	—N/a	
Information and Broadcasting	1947	Ashwini Vaishnaw	—N/a	
Jal Shakti	2019	C. R. Patil	—N/a	
Labour and Employment	1947	Mansukh Mandaviya	—N/a	
Law and Justice	1947	—N/a	Arjun Ram Meghwal	—N/a
Micro, Small and Medium Enterprises	2007	Jitan Ram Manjhi	—N/a	
Mines	1957	G. Kishan Reddy	—N/a	
Minority Affairs	2006	Kiren Rijiju	—N/a	
New and Renewable Energy	1992	Pralhad Joshi	—N/a	
Panchayati Raj	2004	Lalan Singh	—N/a	
Parliamentary Affairs	1949	Kiren Rijiju	—N/a	
Personnel, Public Grievances and Pensions	1970	Narendra Modi (Additional Charge)	—N/a	
Petroleum and Natural Gas	1991	Hardeep Singh Puri	—N/a	
Planning	2014	—N/a	Rao Inderjit Singh	—N/a
Ports, Shipping and Waterways	1947	Sarbananda Sonowal	—N/a	Shantanu Thakur
Power	1992	Manohar Lal	—N/a	Shripad Naik
Railways	1947	Ashwini Vaishnaw	—N/a	V. Somanna; Ravneet Singh Bittu
Road Transport and Highways	1942	Nitin Gadkari	—N/a	Ajay Tamta; Harsh Malhotra
Rural Development	1980	Shivraj Singh Chouhan	—N/a	Chandra Sekhar Pemmasani; Kamlesh Paswan
Science and Technology	1971	—N/a	Dr. Jitendra Singh	—N/a
Skill Development and Entrepreneurship	2014	—N/a	Jayant Chaudhary	—N/a
Social Justice and Empowerment	1985	Virendra Kumar Khatik	—N/a	Ramdas Athawale; B. L. Verma
Statistics and Programme Implementation	1999	—N/a	Rao Inderjit Singh	—N/a
Steel	1957	H. D. Kumaraswamy	—N/a	—N/a
Textiles	1958	Giriraj Singh	—N/a	Pabitra Margherita
Tourism	1999	Gajendra Singh Shekhawat	—N/a	Suresh Gopi
Tribal Affairs	1999	Jual Oram	—N/a	Durga Das Uikey
Women and Child Development	1985	Annpurna Devi	—N/a	Savitri Thakur
Youth Affairs and Sports	2000	Mansukh Mandaviya	—N/a	Raksha Khadse

== Independent departments ==
Independent departments working under the direct supervision of the Prime Minister's Office.

- Department of Atomic Energy
- Department of Space

== Departments ==
Departments working under a specific Ministry.

Department
Department for Promotion of Industry and Internal Trade (DPIIT)
Department of Administrative Reforms and Public Grievances (DARPG)
Department of Agricultural Research and Education (DARE)
Department of Agriculture and Farmers Welfare (DoAFW)
Department of Animal Husbandry and Dairying (DoAHD)
Department of Biotechnology (DBT)
Department of Border Management (DoBM)
Department of Capital Development (DCD)
Department of Chemicals and Petro-Chemicals (DoCP)
Department of Commerce (DoC)
Department of Consumer Affairs (DoCA)
Department of Defence (DoD)
Department of Defence Production (DDP)
Department of Defence Research and Development (DRDO)
Department of Drinking Water and Sanitation (DDWS)
Department of Economic Affairs (DEA)
Department of Empowerment of Persons with Disabilities (DEPWD)
Department of Ex-Servicemen Welfare (DESW)
Department of Expenditure (DoE)
Department of Fertilizers (DoFz)
Department of Financial Services (DoFS)
Department of Fisheries (DoF)
Department of Food and Public Distribution (DFPD)
Department of Health Research (DHR)
Department of Health and Family Welfare (DoHFW)
Department of Higher Education (DoHE)
Department of Home (DoH)
Department of Investment and Public Asset Management (DIPAM)
Department of Justice (DoJ)
Department of Land Resources (DLR)
Department of Legal Affairs (DoLA)
Department of Military Affairs (DMA)
Department of Official Language (DoOL)
Department of Pension & Pensioner's Welfare (DoPPW)
Department of Personnel and Training (DoPT)
Department of Pharmaceuticals (DoPs)
Department of Posts (DoP)
Department of Public Enterprises (DPE)
Department of Revenue (DoR)
Department of Rural Development (DoRD)
Department of School Education and Literacy (DSEL)
Department of Science and Technology (DST)
Department of Scientific and Industrial Research (DSIR)
Department of Social Justice and Empowerment (DoSJE)
Department of Sports (DoS)
Department of Telecommunications (DoT)
Department of Urban Development (DUD)
Department of Water Resources, River Development and Ganga Rejuvenation (DoWRGR)
Department of Youth Affairs (DoYA)
Legislative Department (LD)

== Former ministries ==
The following ministries once functioned, but have since become defunct, generally because of a merger with another ministry or division into new ministries.

Ministry name	Established	Defunct	Fate
Agriculture	August 1947	1 February 1951	Merged to constitute the Ministry of Food and Agriculture.
Food	29 August 1947	1 February 1951	Merged to constitute the Ministry of Food and Agriculture.
Food and Agriculture	1 February 1951	October 1956	Bifurcated into the Ministry of Agriculture and the Ministry of Food.
Agriculture	October 1956	17 April 1957	Merged once again to form the Ministry of Food and Agriculture.
Food	October 1956	17 April 1957	Merged once again to form the Ministry of Food and Agriculture.
Food and Agriculture	17 April 1957	January 1966	Merged with the Ministry of Community Development and Cooperation to form the Ministry of Food, Agriculture, Community Development and Cooperation. The new ministry was renamed the Ministry of Agriculture in 1971, with four departments.
Agriculture	January 1966	1983	The Department of Food was separated from the ministry and elevated to the new Ministry of Food and Civil Supplies.
Food and Civil Supplies	1983	June 1991	Bifurcated into the Ministry of Food and the Ministry of Civil Supplies.
Food	June 1991	4 June 1997	Merged to form Ministry of Food and Consumer Affairs with three departments - Department of Food & Civil Supplies, Department of Sugar and Edible Oils and Department of Consumer Affairs. On 15 October 1999, the new ministry was renamed as the Ministry of Consumer Affairs & Public Distribution, having the same three departments. On 17 July 2000, the Ministry of Consumer Affairs and Public Distribution was renamed as the Ministry of Consumer Affairs, Food and Public Distribution, with two departments - Department of Food & Public Distribution and Department of Consumer Affairs.
Civil Supplies	June 1991	4 June 1997	
National Resources and Scientific Research	1951		
Irrigation and Power	1952	November 1974	Bifurcated into a separate Department of Irrigation under the reconstituted Ministry of Agriculture and Irrigation, and a separate ministry.
Agriculture and Irrigation	November 1974	22 July 1980	Following the formation of the Ministry of Irrigation in June 1980, three items of work were transferred from the ministry to the new ministry, and the Ministry of Agriculture and Irrigation was renamed the Ministry of Agriculture.
Energy and Irrigation	January 1980	9 June 1980	Bifurcated into the Ministry of Energy and the Department of Irrigation (which was brought under the ministry in January 1980) was elevated to the new Ministry of Irrigation.
Irrigation	9 June 1980	January 1985	Merged with the Ministry of Power to once again, form the Ministry of Irrigation and Power.
Irrigation and Power	January 1985	September 1985	Bifurcated into the Ministry of Power and the Department of Irrigation was re-constituted as the Ministry of Water Resources. On 31 July 2014, the Ministry of Water Resources was renamed as Ministry of Water Resources, River Development & Ganga Rejuvenation.
Surface Transport	22 October 1986	17 November 2000	Bifurcated into the Ministry of Shipping and the Ministry of Road Transport and Highways.
Small Scale Industries and Agro and Rural Industries	October 1999	September 2001	Bifurcated into the Ministry of Agro and Rural Industries and the Ministry of Small Scale Industries.
Agro and Rural Industries	September 2001	2007	Merged with the Ministry of Small Scale Industries to form the Ministry of Micro, Small and Medium Enterprises.
Small Scale Industries	September 2001	2007	Merged with the Ministry of Agro and Rural Industries to form the Ministry of Micro, Small and Medium Enterprises.
Overseas Indian Affairs	May 2004	7 January 2016	Merged with the Ministry of External Affairs
Communications and Information Technology	August 1947	5 July 2016	Bifurcated into the Ministry of Electronics and Information Technology and the Ministry of Communications (India)
Drinking Water and Sanitation	2011	30 May 2019	Merged with the Ministry of Water Resources, River Development & Ganga Rejuvenation and formed Ministry of Jal Shakti
Water Resources, River Development & Ganga Rejuvenation	September 1985	30 May 2019	Merged with Ministry of Drinking Water and Sanitation to form Ministry of Jal Shakti constituted with Department of Water Resources and Department of Drinking Water and Sanitation
Ministry of Urban Development		7 July 2017	Ministry of Housing and Urban Affairs
Minister of Urban Development and Poverty Alleviation	7 July 2017	7 July 2017	Ministry Of Housing and Urban Affairs

== See also ==
- List of agencies of the government of India
- Union Council of Ministers
