= Nikhil Chakravarty =

Indian journalist (1913–1998)

Nikhil Chakravartty (1913–1998) was an Indian journalist.

== Biography ==
Chakravartty was born on 3 November 1913 in India's northeastern state of Assam. He was the founder-editor of the respected current affairs weekly Mainstream. He graduated from the University of Calcutta and went on to study at Merton College, Oxford. Chakravarty taught history at Calcutta University in the 1930s before taking to journalism. Before plunging into active journalism, he was special correspondent of the Communist Party of India's People's War and People's Age. In 1959, he set up the India Press Agency and immediately broke the story on the alleged espionage activities of the then Prime Minister's personal assistant, M. O. Mathai. The story rocked parliament, and Mathai was forced to resign. He then founded Mainstream, with which he was associated, first as editor, then as adviser until his death. Between 1975 and 1977, he played a key role in press freedom and, with other senior journalists, fought against Rajiv Gandhi's Anti-Defamation Bill and forced its withdrawal.

Chakravartty was a member of the Second Press Commission, and of the National Integration Council, as well as the Indo-US Sub Commission on Education, Culture and Media. When the Prasar Bharati board was constituted in 1997, Chakravartty was appointed as its first Chairman.

== Death ==
Chakravartty died on 27 June 1998.
