= Padma Bhushan =

Third-highest civilian award in India

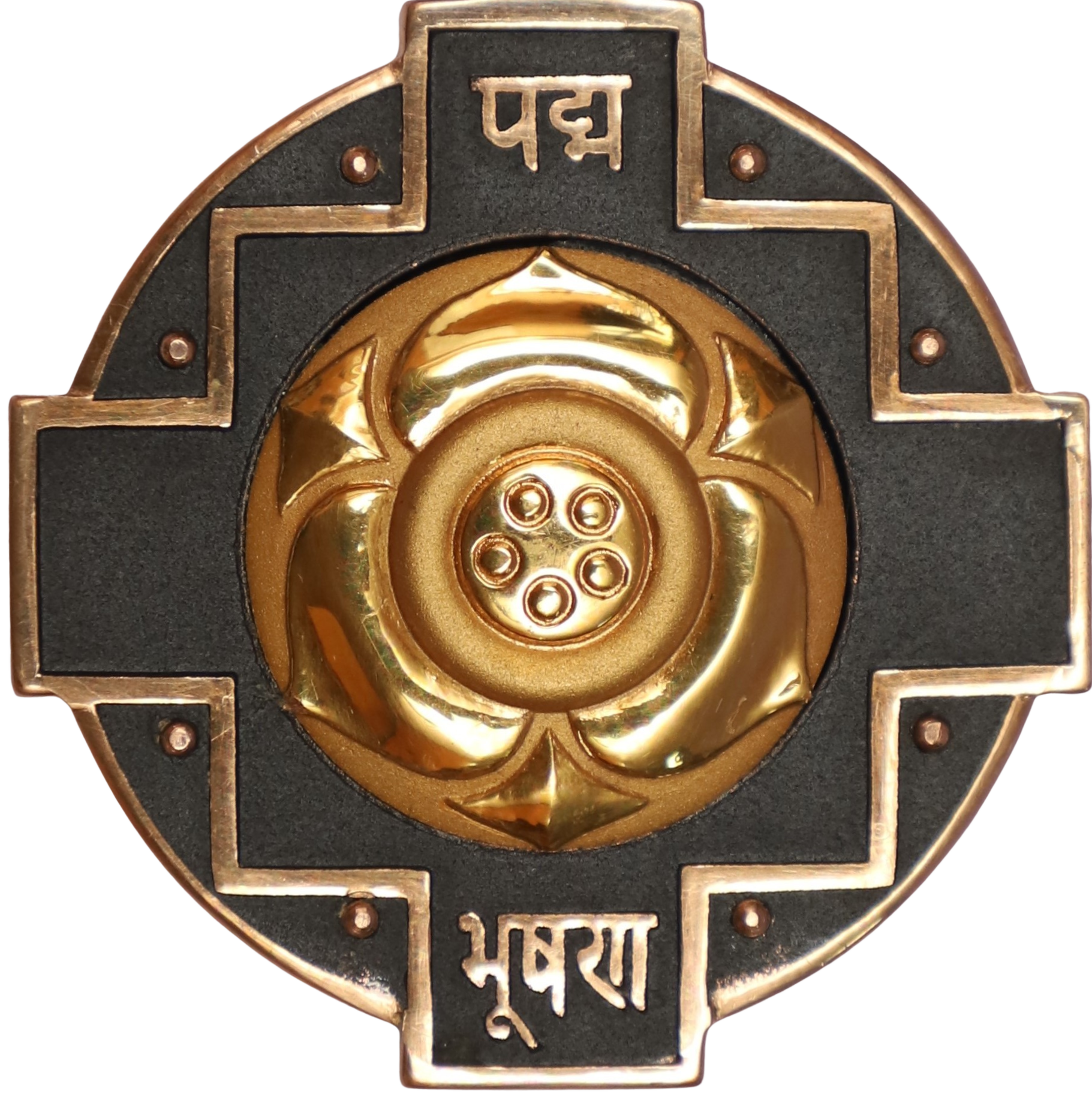
- Medallion of Padma Bhushan
- Type: National Civilian
- Country: India
- Presented by: President of India
- Ribbon
- Obverse: A centrally located lotus flower is embossed, and the text "Padma" written in Devanagari script is placed above, and the text "Bhushan" is placed below the lotus.
- Reverse: A platinum State Emblem of India placed in the centre with the national motto of India, "Satyameva Jayate" (Truth alone triumphs) in Devanagari Script
- Established: 1954; 72 years ago
- First award: 1954
- Final award: 2026

Highlights
- Total: 1354
- Website: padmaawards.gov.in

Precedence
- Next (higher): Padma Vibhushan
- Next (lower): Sarvottam Yudh Seva Medal (military); Padma Shri (civilian)

Padma Bhushan award recipients
Year	Number of recipients
1954–1959	94
1960–1969	200
1970–1979	205
1980–1989	133
1990–1999	113
2000–2009	291
2010–2019	218
2020–2029	87

The Padma Bhushan (IAST: Padma Bhūṣaṇa, lit. 'Lotus Decoration' is the third-highest civilian award in the Republic of India, after the Bharat Ratna and the Padma Vibhushan, and followed by the Padma Shri. Instituted on 2 January 1954, the award is given for "distinguished service of a high order ... without distinction of race, occupation, position or sex". The award criteria include "service in any field, including service rendered by Government servants," including doctors and scientists, but exclude those working with the public sector undertakings. As of 2026, the award has been bestowed on 1354 individuals, including 41 posthumous and 103 non-citizen recipients.

The Padma Awards Committee is constituted every year by the Prime Minister of India and the recommendations for the award are submitted between 1 May and 15 September. The recommendations are received from all the state and the union territory governments, as well as from Ministries of the Government of India, Bharat Ratna and Padma Vibhushan awardees, the Institutes of Excellence, Ministers, Chief Ministers and Governors of States, Members of Parliament, and private individuals. The committee later submits its recommendations to the Prime Minister and the President of India for further approval. The award recipients are announced on 26 January, the Republic Day of India.

When instituted in 1959, twenty-three recipients were honoured with the Padma Bhushan. The Padma Bhushan, along with other personal civil honours, was briefly suspended twice, from July 1977 to January 1980 and from August 1992 to December 1995. Some of the recipients have refused or returned their conferments.

== History ==
On 2 January 1954, a press release was published from the office of the secretary to the President of India announcing the creation of two civilian awards—Bharat Ratna, the highest civilian award, and the three-tier Padma Vibhushan, classified into "Pahela Varg" (Class I), "Dusra Varg" (Class II), and "Tisra Varg" (Class III), which rank below the Bharat Ratna. On 15 January 1955, the Padma Vibhushan was reclassified into three different awards: the Padma Vibhushan, the highest of the three, followed by the Padma Bhushan and the Padma Shri.

The award, along with other personal civilian honours, was briefly suspended twice in its history. The first time in July 1977 when Morarji Desai was sworn in as the fourth Prime Minister of India, for being "worthless and politicized." The suspension was rescinded on 25 January 1980 after Indira Gandhi became the Prime Minister.

The civilian awards were suspended again in mid-1992, when two Public-Interest Litigations were filed in the High Courts of India, one in the Kerala High Court on 13 February 1992 by Balaji Raghavan and another in the Madhya Pradesh High Court (Indore Bench) on 24 August 1992 by Satya Pal Anand. Both petitioners questioned the civilian awards being "titles" per an interpretation of Article 18 (1) of the Constitution of India. (Note: Per Article 18 (1) of the Constitution of India: Abolition of titles, "no title, not being a military or academic distinction, shall be conferred by the State.")

On 25 August 1992, the Madhya Pradesh High Court issued a notice temporarily suspending all civilian awards. A Special Division Bench of the Supreme Court of India was formed comprising five judges: A. M. Ahmadi C. J., Kuldip Singh, B. P. Jeevan Reddy, N. P. Singh, and S. Saghir Ahmad. On 15 December 1995, the Special Division Bench restored the awards and delivered a judgment that the "Bharat Ratna and Padma awards are not titles under Article 18 of the Constitution of India."

== Regulations ==
The award is conferred for "distinguished service of a high order...without distinction of race, occupation, position or sex." The criteria include "service in any field, including service rendered by Government servants" but exclude those working with the public sector undertakings, with the exception of doctors and scientists. The 1954 statutes did not allow posthumous awards, but this was subsequently modified in the January 1955 statute; D. C. Kizhakemuri became the first recipient to be honoured posthumously in 1999.

The recommendations are received from all the state and the union territory governments, as well as from Ministries of the Government of India, Bharat Ratna and Padma Vibhushan awardees, the Institutes of Excellence, Ministers, Chief Ministers and Governors of States, Members of Parliament, and private individuals. The recommendations received between 1 May and 15 September of every year are submitted to the Padma Awards Committee, convened by the Prime Minister of India. The Awards Committee later submits its recommendations to the Prime Minister and the President of India for further approval.

The Padma Bhushan award recipients are announced every year on 26 January, the Republic Day of India, and registered in The Gazette of India—a publication released weekly by the Department of Publication, Ministry of Urban Development used for official government notices. The conferral of the award is not considered official without its publication in the Gazette. Recipients whose awards have been revoked or restored, both of which actions require the authority of the President, are also registered in the Gazette and are required to surrender their medals when their names are struck from the register.

== Specifications ==
The original specification of the award was a circle made of standard silver 1 3/8 inches (35 mm) in diameter, with rims on both sides. A centrally located lotus flower was embossed on the obverse side of the medal and the text "Padma Bhushan" written in Devanagari Script was inscribed above the lotus along the upper edge of the medal. A floral wreath was embossed along the lower edge and a lotus wreath at the top along the upper edge. The State Emblem of India was placed in the centre of the reverse side with the text "Desh Seva" in Devanagari Script on the lower edge. The medal was suspended by a pink riband 1 1/4 inches (32 mm) in width, divided into three equal segments by two white vertical lines.

A year later, the design was modified. The current decoration is a circular-shaped bronze-toned medallion 1 3/4 inches (44 mm) in diameter and 1/8 inch (3.2 mm) thick. The centrally placed pattern made of outer lines of a square of 1 3/16 inches (30 mm) side is embossed with a knob embossed within each of the outer angles of the pattern. A raised circular space of diameter 1 1/16 inches (27 mm) is placed at the centre of the decoration. A centrally located lotus flower is embossed on the obverse side of the medal, and the text "Padma" written in Devanagari script is placed above, and the text "Bhushan" is placed below the lotus.

The Emblem of India is placed in the centre of the reverse side with the national motto of India, "Satyameva Jayate" (Truth alone triumphs) in Devanagari Script, inscribed on the lower edge. The rim, the edges, and all embossing on either side are of standard gold with the text "Padma Bhushan" of gold gilt. The medal is suspended by a pink riband 1 1/4 inches (32 mm) in width with a broad white stripe in the middle.

The medal is ranked fifth in the order of precedence of wearing medals and decorations. The medals are produced at Alipore Mint, Kolkata along with the other civilian and military awards like Bharat Ratna, Padma Vibhushan, Padma Shri, and Param Vir Chakra.

== Refusals and controversies ==
Some of the bestowals of the Padma Bhushan have been refused or returned by the recipients. Bengali theatre activist Sisir Bhaduri (1959) was the first awardee who refused their conferment as "he felt state awards merely help create a sycophantic brigade" and "did not want to encourage the impression that the government was serious about the importance of theatre in national life." Sitar player Vilayat Khan declined to accept the award in 1968, stating that "the selection committees were incompetent to judge [his] music." Khan had earlier refused Padma Shri in 1964 and later also turned down Padma Vibhushan in 2000.

Journalist Nikhil Chakravarty rejected the award in 1990, stating that "journalists should not be identified with the establishment." Historian Romila Thapar refused to accept the award twice, for the first time in 1992, and later again in 2005, stating that she would accept awards only "from academic institutions or those associated with my professional work." For her 2005 bestowal, Thapar sent a clarification letter to the then President A. P. J. Abdul Kalam mentioning that she had declined to accept the award when the Ministry of Human Resource Development had contacted her three months prior to the award announcement and had explained her reasons for not accepting the award. Journalist and civil servant K. Subrahmanyam refused his 1999 bestowal, citing that "bureaucrats and journalists should not accept any award from the government because they are more liable to be favoured."

In 2003, Rashtriya Swayamsevak Sangh's (RSS) volunteer Dattopant Thengadi rejected the award until K. B. Hedgewar (RSS founder) and M. S. Golwalkar (RSS ideologue) are offered the Bharat Ratna. Civil servant S. R. Sankaran turned down the award in 2005 without citing any reason. In 2013, playback singer S. Janaki refused to accept her award and stated that "the award has come late in her five-and-half-decade long career." The singer also mentioned that she is not against the Government and expressed happiness for the recognition, but requested the Government to "show some more consideration to the artists from the southern parts of the country."

In 2014, family members of J. S. Verma who served as 27th Chief Justice of India refused the posthumous conferral, stating that "Verma himself would not have accepted" the honour as he "never hankered or lobbied for any acclaim, reward or favour."

Kannada novelist K. Shivaram Karanth, who was awarded in 1968, returned his award to protest against the Emergency declared in the country in 1975. Novelist Khushwant Singh, who accepted the award in 1974 in the field of literature and education, returned it in 1984 as a notion of protest against the Operation Blue Star. Singh was later awarded the Padma Vibhushan in 2007. Pushpa Mittra Bhargava, 1986 recipient and scientist and founder-director of Centre for Cellular and Molecular Biology (CCMB), returned his award in 2015 in protest of the Dadri mob lynching and out of concern at the "prevailing socio-politico situation" in the country.

The 2010 conferment on an Indian-American businessman Sant Singh Chatwal, who was awarded the Padma Bhushan in the field of Public Affairs, created much controversy. Known for his association with former US President Bill Clinton and his wife Hillary Clinton, Chatwal pled guilty to violating the Federal Election Campaign Act and witness tampering during the 2008 United States presidential election. He was also accused of lobbying for the award by leveraging "his contacts in the Prime Minister's Office and United States Congress."

The Government provided clarification regarding the conferment and issued a press release which mentioned Chatwal as a "tireless advocate" of the country's interest in the United States. The statement also mentioned that "due diligence" exercise is carried out for each of the awardees and out of five Central Bureau of Investigation (CBI) registered cases against Chatwal between 1992 and 1994, three were closed by CBI itself and in remaining two cases, Chatwal was discharged by the Court and as per the reports that were made available to the selection committee, there is nothing adverse on record against him. According to media reports, there were several cases filed or registered after April 2009 which includes three criminal complaints with Kerala Police and four cases in Delhi High Court and Kerala High Court. Chatwal also served a summons in January 2010. However, the then Union Home Secretary Gopal Krishna Pillai said that "no probe has been ordered nor any report sought from anyone."

Earlier in 2008, Chatwal was considered for the Padma Shri, but the Indian Embassy in Washington, D.C. declined to nominate Chatwal when asked by the Prime Minister's Office. The then Indian Ambassador to the United States Ronen Sen had told PMO that the conferral would not be appropriate because of the controversy associated with his financial dealings in India and America. Sen also mentioned that, though positive, Chatwal's contributions are much less compared to those of other Indian-Americans. The bestowal would not only "demoralise the others who had done much more" but also would create "the impression that India did not regard lack of transparency in financial dealings as a disqualification for its highest honours."

In 2022, former West Bengal Chief Minister Buddhadeb Bhattacharya refused to accept his award on the eve of the 73rd Republic Day of India. He reportedly refused to have been intimated about his nomination and straightaway exclaimed in the media that if he had been awarded, he would refuse the same. His name appeared on the official list of awardees, and so far, he has refused the same.

== List of awardees ==
- List of Padma Bhushan award recipients (1954–1959)
- List of Padma Bhushan award recipients (1960–1969)
- List of Padma Bhushan award recipients (1970–1979)
- List of Padma Bhushan award recipients (1980–1989)
- List of Padma Bhushan award recipients (1990–1999)
- List of Padma Bhushan award recipients (2000–2009)
- List of Padma Bhushan award recipients (2010–2019)
- List of Padma Bhushan award recipients (2020–2029)

== Bibliography ==
- Bhattacherje, S. B. (2009). Encyclopaedia of Indian Events & Dates. Sterling Publishers Pvt. Ltd. ISBN 978-81-207-4074-7.
- Edgar, Thorpe (2011). The Pearson General Knowledge Manual 2011. Pearson Education India. ISBN 978-81-317-5640-9.
- Hoiberg, Dale; Ramchandani, Indu (2000). Students' Britannica India. Vol. 1–5. Popular Prakashan. ISBN 978-81-7156-112-4.
