= Operation Green Hunt =

Indian anti-Naxalite campaign since 2009

- Part of Naxalite–Maoist insurgency
Date	September 2009 – 31 March 2026 (16 years, 6 months)
Location	Red Corridor
Result	Indian Government victory: Naxalite–Maoist insurgency mostly defeated; All but one leader killed, captured, or surrendered

Belligerents
(India) Government of India: Paramilitary forces; Central Reserve Police Force; State Armed Police Forces; Indian Armed Forces; Ministry of Home Affairs; Ministry of External Affairs	Communist Party of India (Maoist): People's Liberation Guerrilla Army

Commanders and leaders
(India) Droupadi Murmu; (India) C. P. Radhakrishnan; (India) Narendra Modi; (India) Amit Shah; (India) S. Jaishankar; Gyanendra Pratap Singh; Anil Chauhan; Ashutosh Dixit; Arti Sarin; Upendra Dwivedi; Dinesh Kumar Tripathi; Amar Preet Singh; Paramesh Sivamani; Praveen Kumar; Rajnath Singh; Rajesh Kumar Singh; Former: Pratibha Patil; Pranab Mukherjee; Ram Nath Kovind; Mohammad Hamid Ansari; Venkaiah Naidu; Jagdeep Dhankhar; Manmohan Singh; P. Chidambaram; Sushilkumar Shinde; S. M. Krishna; Salman Khurshid; Sushma Swaraj; A. S. Gill; Vikram Srivastava; K. Vijay Kumar; Pranay Sahay; Dilip Trivedi; Prakash Mishra; K. Durga Prasad; R. R. Bhatnagar; Anand Prakash Maheshwari; Kuldeep Singh; Dr. Sujoy Lal Thaosen; Anish Dayal Singh; Bipin Rawat; Suresh Chandra Mukul; Devendra Kumar Joshi; Shekhar Sinha; Surinder Pal Singh Cheema; N. C. Marwah; Anil Chait; P. P. Reddy; Satish Dua; Podali Shankar Rajeshwar; R. Hari Kumar; Atul Kumar Jain; Balabhadra Radha Krishna; Johnson P Mathew; Naresh Kumar Parmar; Hira Lal Kakria; Dhananjay Parashuram Joshi; Bhushan Kumar Chopra; Manoj Kumar Unni; Bipin Puri; Anup Banerji; Rajat Datta; Daljit Singh; Deepak Kapoor; V. K. Singh; Bikram Singh; Dalbir Singh Suhag; Bipin Rawat; Manoj Mukund Naravane; Manoj Pande; Nirmal Kumar Verma; Devendra Kumar Joshi; Robin K. Dhowan; Sunil Lanba; Karambir Singh; R. Hari Kumar; Pradeep Vasant Naik; Norman Anil Kumar Browne; Arup Raha; Birender Singh Dhanoa; R. K. S. Bhadauria; Vivek Ram Chaudhari; Anil Chopra; M. P. Muralidharan; Anurag Thapliyal; Harish Bisht; Rajendra Singh Bisht; Krishnaswamy Natarajan; Virender Singh Pathania; Rakesh Pal†; Raman Srivastava; U. K. Bansal; Subhash Joshi; D. K. Pathak; K. K. Sharma; Rajni Kant Mishra; V. K. Johri; Surjeet Singh Deswal; Rakesh Asthana; Pankaj Kumar Singh; Sujoy Lal Thaosen; Nitin Agarwal; Daljit Singh Chaudhary; A. K. Antony; Arun Jaitley; Manohar Parrikar; Nirmala Sitharaman; Pradeep Kumar; Shashi Kant Sharma; R. K. Mathur; G. Mohan Kumar; Sanjay Mitra; Ajay Kumar; Giridhar Aramane	Ganapathy; Former: Asim Mondal (POW); Misir Besra (POW); Ankit Pandey (POW); Anand †; Kosa †; Vikas (POW); Kishenji †; Charu Majumdar (POW); Kanu Sanyal ‡‡; Jangal Santhal (POW); Sabyasachi Panda (POW); Prashant Bose (POW); Ashutosh Tudu (POW); Yalavarthi Naveen Babu †; Narmada Akka †; Arun Kumar Bhattacharjee (POW); Deo Kumar Singh †; Milind Teltumbde †; Jagdish Mahto †; Subrata Dutta †; Mahendar Singh †; Anil Baruah †; Shankar Rao †; Vinod Gawde †; Lalitha †

Strength
Central Reserve Police Force: 7,000 (April 2010); State Armed Police Forces: 200,000 (September 2013); Special Operation Group: Unknown; Naga Regiment: 2,000 (August 2014); Greyhounds: Unknown; Indian Air Force: Mi-17 and Mi-17V-5 helicopters + 12 searcher tactical drones	People's Liberation Guerrilla Army: 11,500 (August 2013) 8,000 – 9,000 (September 2013); People's Militia: 38,000 (August 2013)

Casualties and losses
1,435 killed	According to India: 2,266 killed 9,714 surrendered 10,181 arrested
- 2,319 civilians killed

Operation Green Hunt is the name used by the Indian media to describe the "all-out offensive by paramilitary forces and the state forces" against the Naxalites.

The term was coined by the Chhattisgarh police officials to describe one successful drive against the banned Communist Party of India (Maoist) in the state. It was erroneously used by the media to describe the wider anti-Naxalite operations; the government of India does not use the term "Operation Green Hunt" to describe its anti-Naxalite offensive.

== Planning and implementation ==
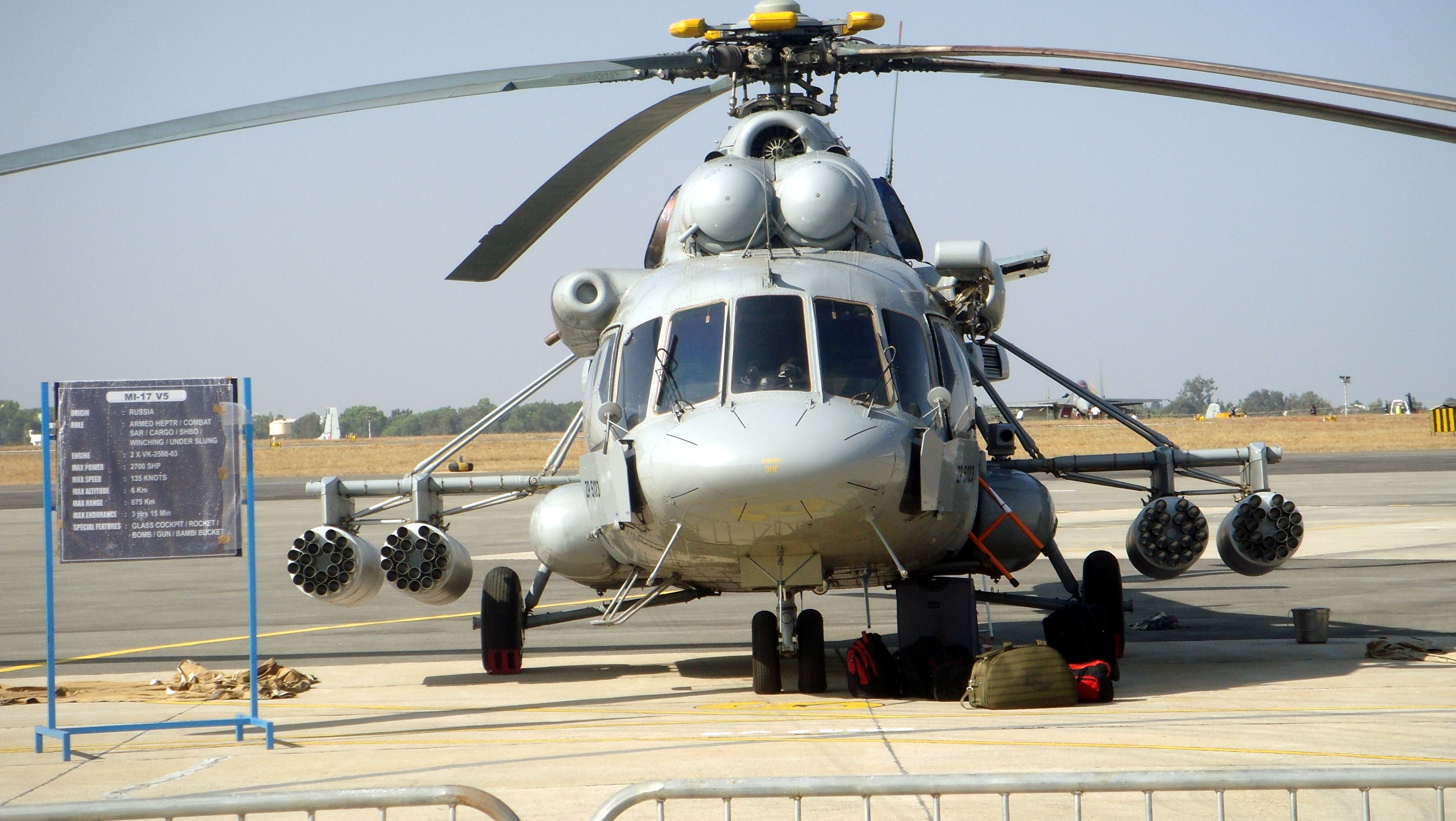
A fleet of Mi-17 V5s were deployed by the Indian Air Force to assist counter-insurgency efforts.

In October 2009, the Central Reserve Police Force (CRPF) announced that it was in the final stages of planning the offensive and had received approval from the Union-led government. The Commando Battalion for Resolute Action (CoBRA) would take the lead in the operations against Maoist insurgents. However, media had already reported in September 2009, a "massive three-day joint operation" by the CoBRA and Chhattisgarh police against the Maoists in Dantewada.

In November 2009, the first phase of the operation began in Gadchiroli district. As many as 18 companies of the central paramilitary forces were moved into the area in anticipation of the operation.

In April 2010, Mark Sofer had a conversation with Buddhadeb Bhattacharjee and M. K. Narayanan on the subject of the "Maoist extremism" and West Bengal's internal security, and offered assistance by Israel in the state's battle against the Maoists.

In 2009, the government of India had decided to move 80,000 central paramilitary personnel to wage offensive against the Maoists, strengthened by a fleet of 10 armed helicopters from the Indian Air Force. On 3 January 2013, the government of India said it would deploy 10,000 more central paramilitary personnel in Bastar, Odisha and some parts of Jharkhand. By May 2013, about 84,000 troops from the CRPF had been stationed in the Red corridor.

Apart from the paramilitary personnel, the SAPF personnel deployed in operations against the Maoists are estimated to number around 200,000. In his analysis in March 2014, Gautam Navlakha has claimed that 286,200 CRPF personnel along with 100,000 personnel from other central paramilitary forces and the SAPF are now engaged in the offensive against Maoist insurgents in 10 states of India. On 8 June 2014, the Minister of Home Affairs officially approved the deployment of another 10,000 troops from the paramilitary forces to fight against the Maoists in Chhattisgarh.

In May 2013, the Ministry of Home Affairs ordered an additional 10,000 paramilitary personnel to move "towards a fight to finish war against Maoists in the Red Zone."

The Indian Army has also been stationed in the Red corridor; however, the Army claims that it is present there to train the paramilitary personnel to fight against the Maoists and denies its direct role in the offensive operations. The Chief of the Army Staff and the 7 army commanders in mid-2011 had assessed that, if required, about 60,000-65,000 troops from the Indian Army would need to be induced in Andhra Pradesh, Bihar, Chhattisgarh, Jharkhand, Madhya Pradesh, Maharashtra, Odisha and West Bengal to battle the Naxalites. On 30 May 2013, the Indian Air Force's Air Chief Marshal declared that apart from the currently operating MI-17 helicopters, the Indian Air Force is inducing a fleet of MI-17V5 helicopters to "provide full support to anti-Naxal operations."

In August 2014, the Ministry of Home Affairs stated that it is "sending" 2,000 personnel from the Naga Battalions of the Nagaland's Indian Reserve Battalions (IRB) in Chhattisgarh's Bastar to attack the Maoists, which according to The Economic Times, would make Bastar "the most militarised zone in India." The Naga Battalion personnel are being sent to fight the Maoists for a second time, having battled the Maoists once earlier in West Bengal.

The Indian armed forces' personnel use satellite phones and they have access to unmanned aerial vehicles (UAVs). Security forces have been using UAVs in anti-Maoist operations for quite some time in Bihar, Chhattisgarh and Jharkhand. Presently, the UAVs are being provided by the National Technical Research Organisation (NTRO) and Indian Air Force, but they have not been able to yield desired results for the armed forces. Hence, to further advance the offensive, the Defence Research and Development Organisation has taken an initiative to specially develop UAVs with "lower frequency radars" for the armed forces to "track down" the Maoists. The NTRO has imported 12 drones from Israel for aerial surveillance of Naxalites' activities in the forest region on Andhra Pradesh–Orissa–Chhattisgarh border.

== See also ==
- Naxalites
- Timeline of the Naxalite-Maoist insurgency
- Operation Steeplechase
- Walking with the Comrades
