= V. S. R. Murthy =

VSR Murthy
- Born: 12 July 1959 (age 67)
- Military career
- Allegiance: India
- Branch: Indian Coast Guard
- Rank: Additional Director General
- Commands: Coast Guard Region (North East); Coast Guard Region (Andaman & Nicobar); ICGS Samar; CG Station Delhi; CG DHQ-11 (Goa); CG DHQ-5 (TN); ICGS Vijaya; ICGS Kitturchennamma
- Awards: President's Tatrakshak Medal; Tatrakshak Medal (Gallantry)

V. S. R. Murthy, PTM, TM (Gallantry) (born 12 July 1959) is a retired Additional Director General of Indian Coast Guard.

== Early life and education ==
Murthy was born on 12 July 1959 in Andhra Pradesh. A gold Medalist of the Andhra Pradesh University, the officer holds master's degree in Marine Sciences from Andhra University and Defence & Strategic Studies from Madras University. The officer also holds Master of Philosophy and a Master of Business Administration in Human Resources Management from the Indira Gandhi National Open University.

== Military career ==
Murthy was commissioned into Indian Coast Guard as Assistant Commandant on 18 Jan 1984. Topper of the Coast Guard's fifth batch of officers, he has held several key command and staff appointments, both afloat and ashore. His command with distinction, of all four major ship classes of the Indian Coast Guard includes the Advanced Offshore Patrol Vessel Samar (Best Coast Guard Unit), Offshore Patrol Vessel Vijaya (Best Search & Rescue Ship), Fast Patrol Vessel Annie Besant and Inshore Patrol Vessel Kittur Chennamma (Best Taut Ship).

Murthy's command appointments ashore include the Commander Coast Guard District No. 5 (Tamil Nadu), Commander Coast Guard District No.11 (Goa) and Commanding Officer, ICGS Delhi. His key staff assignment include Principal Director (Policy & Plans) and Joint Director (Human Resources Development) at Coast Guard Headquarters and Chief Staff Officer (Personnel & Administration) at the Coast Guard Regional Headquarters (West), Mumbai.

The Flag Officer is an alumnus of the National Defence College, New Delhi and Defence Services Staff College, Wellington. He has received specialised Training in Search & Rescue and Port Operations at the US Coast Guard Reserve Training Centre, Yorktown.

== Awards and Distinctions ==
Murthy is a recipient of President Tatrakshak Medal (Distinguished Service) in 2012, Tatrakshak Medal (Gallantry) in 2003 and the Lieutenant Governor (A&N Islands) Commendation in 1989. He was awarded the Director General Commendation twice in 1988 and 2006.

== Personal life ==
Murthy has been married to Jyoti since 1988, and they have a son Master Nikhil Kumar.
