= Krishnaswamy Natarajan =

Overview of career, roles and his life Achievements

Director General Krishnaswamy Natarajan PVSM, PTM, TM
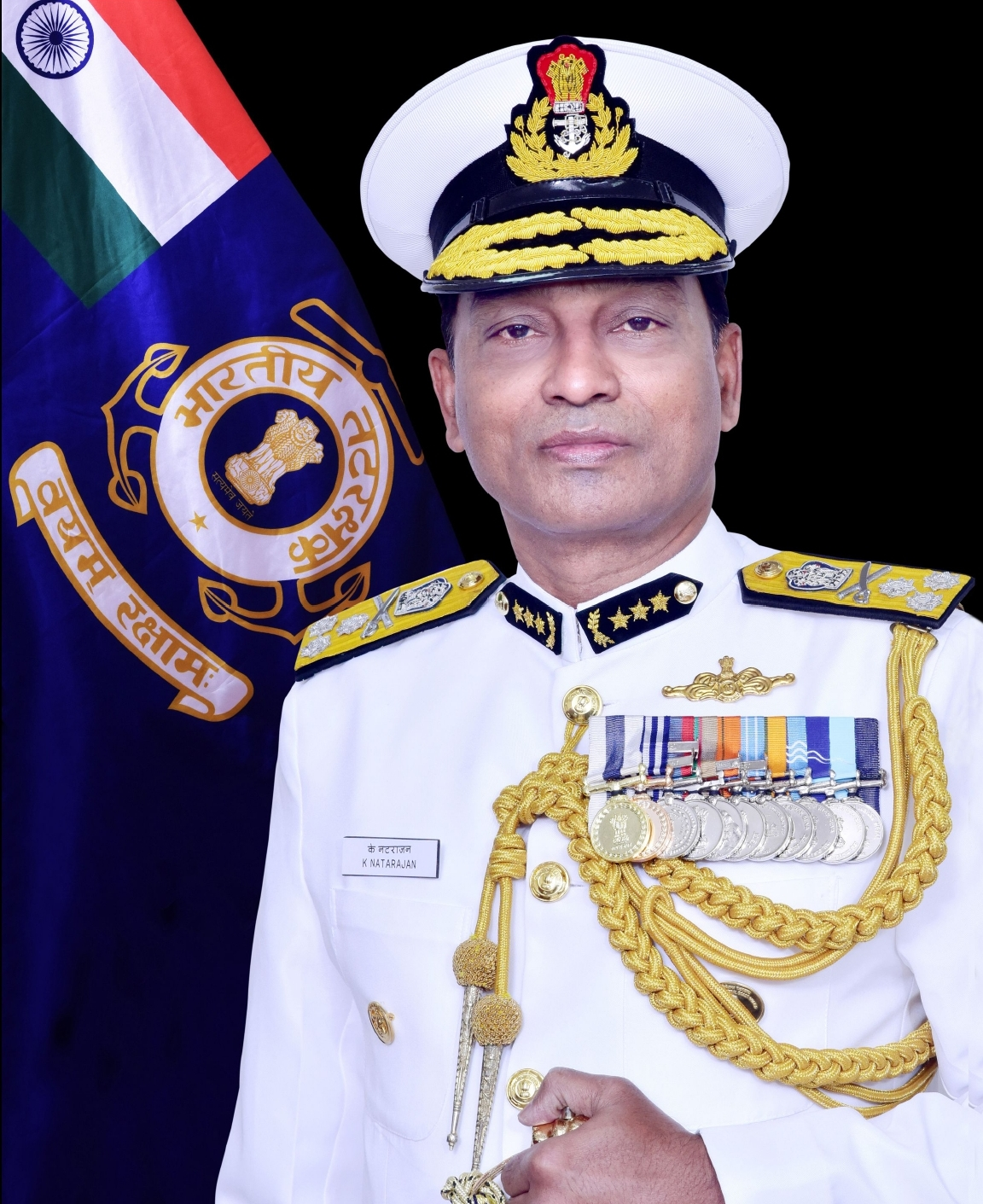
- Director General Krishnaswamy Natarajan
- Born: 30 December 1961; Chennai, Tamil Nadu, India
- Spouse: Mrs Jayanthi Natarajan
- Military career
- Allegiance: India
- Branch: Indian Coast Guard
- Service years: 18 January 1984 - 31 December 2021
- Rank: Director General
- Commands: Western Seaboard; Coast Guard Region (West); Coast Guard Region (A&N); ICGS Sangram; CGTC (Kochi); EX-ICGS Veera; Ex-ICGS Kanaklata Barua; Ex-ICGS Chandbibi; ICGS Mandapam
- Awards: Param Vishisht Seva Medal; President's Tatrakshak Medal; Tatrakshak Medal

Krishnaswamy Natarajan PVSM, PTM, TM, is a retired Indian Coast Guard officer who served as the 23rd Director General of the Indian Coast Guard. He assumed the office on 1 July 2019 and served until his superannuation on 31 December 2021. He is currently the Executive Director of Regional Cooperation Agreement on Combating Piracy and Armed Robbery against ships in Asia - Information Sharing Centre (ReCAAP, ISC) in Singapore.

Controversy

In 2025, the Central Bureau of Investigation (CBI) booked K Natarajan for alleged tampering/alteration of the Annual Confidential Reports (ACRs)/dossiers of senior officers. The agency has invoked provisions related to criminal conspiracy, cheating and forgery and named Mr. Natarajan as an accused.

== Early life and education ==
Natarajan was born on 30 Dec 1961 and completed his education in Chennai. He holds a master's degree in Defence & Strategic Studies from Madras University. He is an alumnus of the Defence Services Staff College, Wellington. He has specialized in Search and Rescue as well as Maritime Safety and Port Operations, at the United States Coast Guard Training Center in Yorktown, Virginia.

== Career ==
Natarajan joined the Indian Coast Guard on 18 January 1984 and did his education in Chennai. He holds a master's degree in Defence & Strategic Studies from Madras University. He is an alumnus of the Defence Services Staff College, Wellington. He has specialized in Search and Rescue as well as Maritime Safety and Port Operations, at the US Coast Guard Reserve Training Centre, Yorktown, Virginia.

Natarajan has held various important Command and Staff appointments, both afloat and ashore, with distinction. He has commanded all classes of Indian Coast Guard ships viz Advanced Offshore Patrol Vessel (AOPV) Sangram, Offshore Patrol Vessel (OPV) Veera, Fast Patrol Vessel (FPV) Kanaklata Barua and Inshore Patrol Vessel (IPV) Chandbibi. His important ashore Command appointments include the Commander Coast Guard District No.5 (Tamil Nadu) and the Commanding Officer ICGS Mandapam. His key staff assignments at the Coast Guard Headquarters, New Delhi include Principal Director (Policy & Plans), Chairman Coast Guard Service Selection Board, Principal Director (Projects), Joint Director (Operations), Coast Guard Advisor (CGA) to Director General Indian Coast Guard. Natarajan has held the appointments of Chief Staff Officer (Personnel & Administration) at Headquarters Region (East), Chennai and Chief of Staff at Headquarters Region (West), Mumbai.He has also held the appointment of Officer-in-Charge, Coast Guard Training Centre, Kochi.

=== Flag rank ===
On elevation to the Flag rank in Aug 2009, he spearheaded the Staff Division of Policy & Plans at the Coast Guard Headquarters as the Deputy Director General (Policy & Plans) till Apr 2014. He was instrumental in giving a fillip to the overall growth of the Coast Guard, post 26/11, in terms of establishing additional 20 Stations, 10 Air Establishment, Two Regional Headquarters, Two Seaboards and contract for 120 ships & boats and infrastructure development including a dedicated Academy. Natarajan was Commander Coast Guard Region (Andaman & Nicobar) from May 14-Jul-15 and Commander Coast Guard Region (West) from Jul 15-Aug-16. He was elevated to the rank of Additional Director General on 12-Aug-16 and since then held the reins of the Coast Guard Commander (Western Seaboard) till 29-Jun-19.

The numerous achievements of the Flag Officer during his distinguished career include those having deep fiscal bearing for the country. As the then Commanding Officer of CG Station at Mandapam in 1991–92, choked channels for smuggling of contrabands to Sri Lanka. In June 2006, his methodical planning as Chief of Staff Headquarters Region (West) resulted in apprehension of 200 kg Cocaine off Mumbai. In July 2017, as the Coast Guard Commander (Western Seaboard), the Apex Level Op Control Authority on the West Coast, orchestrated the landmark operation for intercepting MV Hennry leading to recovery of 1.5 Ton Heroin worth ₹ 5000 Cr. In recognition of his exceptional service, he was awarded “World Customs Organisation (WCO) Certificate of Merit” in 2018.

Natarajan is the second direct entry Coast Guard officer who took over the helm of Indian Coast Guard on 30 Jun 19 as 23rd Director General.

== Personal life ==
Natarajan is married to Jayanthi Natarajan and they have two children.

== Awards and decorations ==
Natarajan is a recipient of Param Vishisht Seva Medal in 2021, President's Tatrakshak Medal (Distinguished Service) in 2011, Tatrakshak Medal (Meritorious) in 1996, Lieutenant Governor (Andaman & Nicobar Islands) Commendation in Jan 15. He was awarded “Kashti Ratna” in Oct 16 and “Samudra Manthan Award” in Dec 2017 for outstanding contribution towards maritime Safety and Security.

Param Vishist Seva Medal	President's Tatrakshak Medal	Tatrakshak Medal	Special Service Medal 'Suraksha'
Operation Parakram Medal	Sainya Seva Medal	Videsh Seva Medal	50th Anniversary of Independence Medal
Coast Guard Silver Jubilee Medal	30 Years Long Service Medal	20 Years Long Service Medal	9 Years Long Service Medal

== Events & Activities ==
Investiture Ceremony

. 11 Feb 2025 - CBI books former Coast Guard Director-General Natarajan https://www.thehindu.com/news/national/cbi-books-former-coast-guard-director-general-natarajan/article69205638.ece

- 26 Sep 2019 - Digital commissioning first of its kind in maritime history: Coast Guard DG

Commissioning of Assets

- 28 Aug 21 : ICGS Vigraha - Raksha Mantri Shri Rajnath Singh to commission indigenously built Indian Coast Guard Ship Vigraha on Saturday
- 29 May 21 : ICGS Sajag - Indian Coast Guard Offshore Patrol Vessel Sajag commissioned by National Security Advisor Shri Ajit Doval
- 24 Mar 21 : ICGS Vajra - Coast Guard patrol vessel Vajra commissioned, to be based at Tuticorin
- 19 Feb 21 : ICGS C-453 - ICG ship C-453 commissioned
- 15 Dec 20 : ICGS Sujeet - Offshore Patrol Vessel 'Sujeet' to be commissioned today
- 15 Dec 20 : ICGS C-454 - Coast Guard commissions interceptor boat in Surat
- 03 Nov 20 : ICGS C-452 - "Commissioning of Coast Guard Ship C-452". Archived from the original on 22 September 2021.
- 20 Aug 20 : ICGS C-449 - Indian Coast Guard commissions new Interceptor boat C-449 for east region
- 15 May 20 : ICGS Sachet, C-450 & C-451 - Raksha Mantri Shri Rajnath Singh commissions Indian Coast Guard Ship ‘Sachet’ and two interceptor boats;
- 28 Feb 20 : ICGS Varad - Shri Mansukh Mandaviya commissions Indian Coast Guard’s Offshore Patrol Vessel ICGS Varad;
- 29 Jan 20 : ICGS C-448 - ICG commissions interceptor boat C-448 in Mangaluru
- 25 Sep 19 : ICGS Varaha - Rajnath Singh: ICGS 'Varaha' commissioned by Rajnath Singh

Military offices
Preceded by Rajendra Singh Bisht	Director General of the Indian Coast Guard; 2019 - 2021	Succeeded by Virender Singh Pathania
