= Director General of the Indian Coast Guard =

Head of the Indian Coast Guard

- Flag of Indian Coast Guard

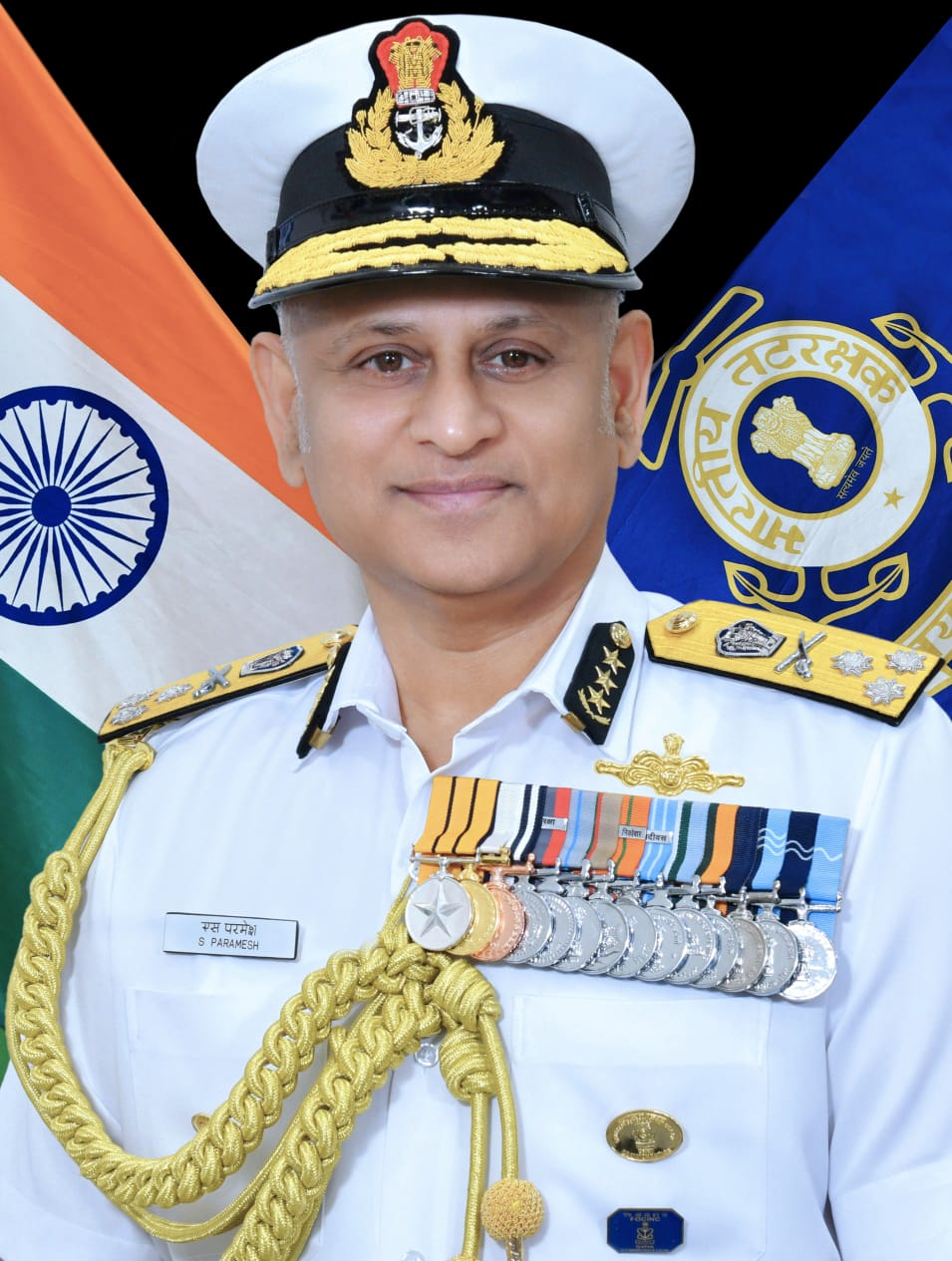
- Incumbent; Paramesh Sivamani since Oct 15, 2024
- Indian Coast Guard
- Abbreviation: DG ICG
- Reports to: Minister of Defence
- Residence: New Delhi
- Seat: Coast Guard Headquarters, New Delhi
- Appointer: Appointments Committee of the Cabinet (ACC)
- Formation: 19 August 1978
- First holder: Vice Admiral V. A. Kamath, PVSM
- Deputy: Additional Director General of the Indian Coast Guard (ADG ICG)
- Website: DG ICG

The Director General of the Indian Coast Guard (DG ICG) is the head of the Indian Coast Guard. The DG ICG has their office in the Coast Guard Headquarters (CGHQ) in New Delhi. Appointed by the Government of India, the DG ICG reports to the Minister of Defence. The Director General is assisted by four Deputy Directors General, each holding the rank of inspector-general, and other senior officers heading various staff divisions. The Additional Director General of the ICG serves as the second-in-command to the Director General.

The post of Director General of the Indian Coast Guard is held by a three-star rank holder as a position and is not a rank in itself. It is equivalent to Vice Admiral of the Indian Navy, Lieutenant General of the Indian Army, Air Marshal of the Indian Air Force, and the Director General of Central Armed Police Forces/State Police Forces. (Note: FOC-in-C: Flag Officer Commanding-in-Chief, GOC-in-C: General Officer Commanding-in-Chief, AOC-in-C: Air Officer Commanding-in-Chief.) The rank of Additional Director General of the Indian Coast Guard is equivalent to that of a Lieutenant General of the Indian Army. (Note: In the Indian Armed Forces, three-star ranks fall into three categories, namely: HAG Scale, HAG+ Scale, and Commanders (GOC-in-C /FOC-in-C /AOC-in-C) Scale. HAG Scale stands at the bottom, whereas the Commanders Scale is the highest.)

Paramesh Sivamani is the current Director General of the Indian Coast Guard who assumed the office after Rakesh Pal died on 18th August 2024 following a cardiac arrest.

== History ==
The Indian Coast Guard came into being on 19 August 1978. The new service was to function under the overall command and control of a Director general. Vice Admiral V. A. Kamath, deputed from the Indian Navy, served as the first DG ICG. Appointed on 19 August 1978, he served in the capacity until 31 March 1980.

Until 2016, appointees to the position of the Director General were Vice Admirals in the Indian Navy who were deputed to the Coast Guard with the exceptions of Rameshwar Singh and P. Paleri - two naval officers who were permanently deputed to the Coast Guard service after serving in the Navy. In 2016, Rajendra Singh Bisht became first Indian Coast Guard officer to serve as its Director General.

== Additional responsibilities ==
Apart from heading the Coast Guard, the DGICG is also:

- Chairman, National Maritime Search and Rescue Board (NMSARB)
- Chairman, National Oil-spill Disaster Contingency Plan Committee (NOSDCP)
- Chairman, Offshore Security Co-ordination Committee (OSCC), of which the Flag Officer Defence Advisory Group is a member.
- Indian Governor to Regional Co-operation Agreement on Combating Piracy and Armed Robbery against ships in Asia (ReCAAP)

== Insignia ==
The badges of rank have a crossed sword and baton over three eight-pointed stars and the Ashoka emblem above, on a golden shoulder board. The Director General wears gorget patches which are navy blue patches with three golden stars and oak leaves under the three golden stars. In addition to this, the double-breasted reefer jacket has three golden sleeve stripes consisting of a broad band with two narrower bands.

== List of Directors General ==
No.	Portrait	Name	Took office	Left office	Time in office
1	V. A. KamathPVSM	Vice Admiral; V. A. Kamath; PVSM (1921–2017)	19 August 1978	31 March 1980	1 year, 225 days
2	Swaraj ParkashPVSM, MVC, AVSM	Vice Admiral; Swaraj Parkash; PVSM, MVC, AVSM (1923–2004)	1 April 1980	31 March 1982	1 year, 364 days
3	M. R. SchunkerPVSM, AVSM	Vice Admiral; M. R. Schunker; PVSM, AVSM (1924–2021)	1 April 1982	31 March 1984	1 year, 365 days
4	S. Jain	Vice Admiral; S. Jain	19 June 1984	14 February 1985	240 days
5	I. J. S. Khurana	Vice Admiral; I. J. S. Khurana	15 February 1985	30 June 1987	2 years, 135 days
6	H. Johnson	Vice Admiral; H. Johnson	10 July 1987	27 June 1990	2 years, 352 days
7	S. W. Lakhar	Vice Admiral; S. W. Lakhar	28 June 1990	31 August 1992	2 years, 64 days
8	K. K. Kohli	Vice Admiral; K. K. Kohli	5 October 1992	3 January 1995	2 years, 90 days
9	P. J. Jacob	Vice Admiral; P. J. Jacob	4 January 1995	17 November 1996	1 year, 318 days
10	R. N. Ganesh	Vice Admiral; R. N. Ganesh	18 November 1996	4 March 1999	2 years, 106 days
11	John Colin De SilvaPVSM, AVSM	Vice Admiral; John Colin De Silva; PVSM, AVSM (1943–2019)	5 March 1999	6 March 2001	2 years, 1 day
12	Rameshwar Singh	Vice Admiral; Rameshwar Singh	7 March 2001	29 September 2001	206 days
13	O. P. Bansal	Vice Admiral; O. P. Bansal	30 September 2001	12 January 2003	1 year, 104 days
14	Sureesh MehtaPVSM, AVSM	Vice Admiral; Sureesh Mehta; PVSM, AVSM (born 1947)	13 January 2003	19 August 2004	1 year, 219 days
15	A. K. Singh	Vice Admiral; A. K. Singh	20 August 2004	24 February 2006	1 year, 188 days
16	Prabhakaran Paleri	Director General; Prabhakaran Paleri	28 February 2006	31 August 2006	184 days
17	R. F. ContractorAVSM, NM	Vice Admiral; R. F. Contractor; AVSM, NM	31 August 2006	30 November 2008	2 years, 91 days
18	Anil ChopraPVSM, AVSM	Vice Admiral; Anil Chopra; PVSM, AVSM	1 December 2008	29 October 2011	2 years, 332 days
19	M. P. Muralidharan	Vice Admiral; M. P. Muralidharan	1 November 2011	28 February 2013	1 year, 119 days
20	Anurag Thapliyal	Vice Admiral; Anurag Thapliyal	1 March 2013	31 January 2015	1 year, 336 days
21	Harish BishtPVSM, AVSM	Vice Admiral; Harish Bisht; PVSM, AVSM (born 1957)	1 February 2015	28 February 2016	27 days
22	Rajendra Singh BishtPTM, TM	Rajendra Singh Bisht; PTM, TM (born 1959)	1 March 2016	30 June 2019	3 years, 121 days
23	Krishnaswamy NatarajanPVSM, PTM, TM	Krishnaswamy Natarajan; PVSM, PTM, TM (born 1961)	1 July 2019	31 December 2021	2 years, 183 days
24	Virender Singh PathaniaPVSM, PTM, TM	Virender Singh Pathania; PVSM, PTM, TM (born 1963)	31 December 2021	31 January 2023	1 year, 31 days
25	Rakesh PalAVSM, PTM, TM	Rakesh Pal; AVSM, PTM, TM (1965–2024)	19 July 2023	18 August 2024 †	1 year, 30 days
26	Paramesh SivamaniAVSM, PTM, TM	Paramesh Sivamani; AVSM, PTM, TM (born 1965)	15 October 2024	Incumbent	1 year, 341 days

† - Died in office

== Notes ==
Footnotes

== Bibliography ==
- "Director General: Indian Coast Guard". Indian Coast Guard. Government of India.
- Hiranandani, Gulab Mohanlal (2010), Transition to Guardianship: The Indian Navy 1991–2000, Lancer Publishers LLC, ISBN 978-1-935501-66-4
- Reddy, Krishna (2007), Tmh General Knowledge Manual, Tata McGraw-Hill Education, ISBN 978-0-07-061999-9
- Singh, Anup (2018), Blue Waters Ahoy!, The Indian Navy 2001-2010, HarperCollins Publishers India, ISBN 9789353025526
