= Virender Singh Pathania =

24th Director General of the Indian Coast Guard

Director General Virender Singh Pathania PVSM, PTM, TM
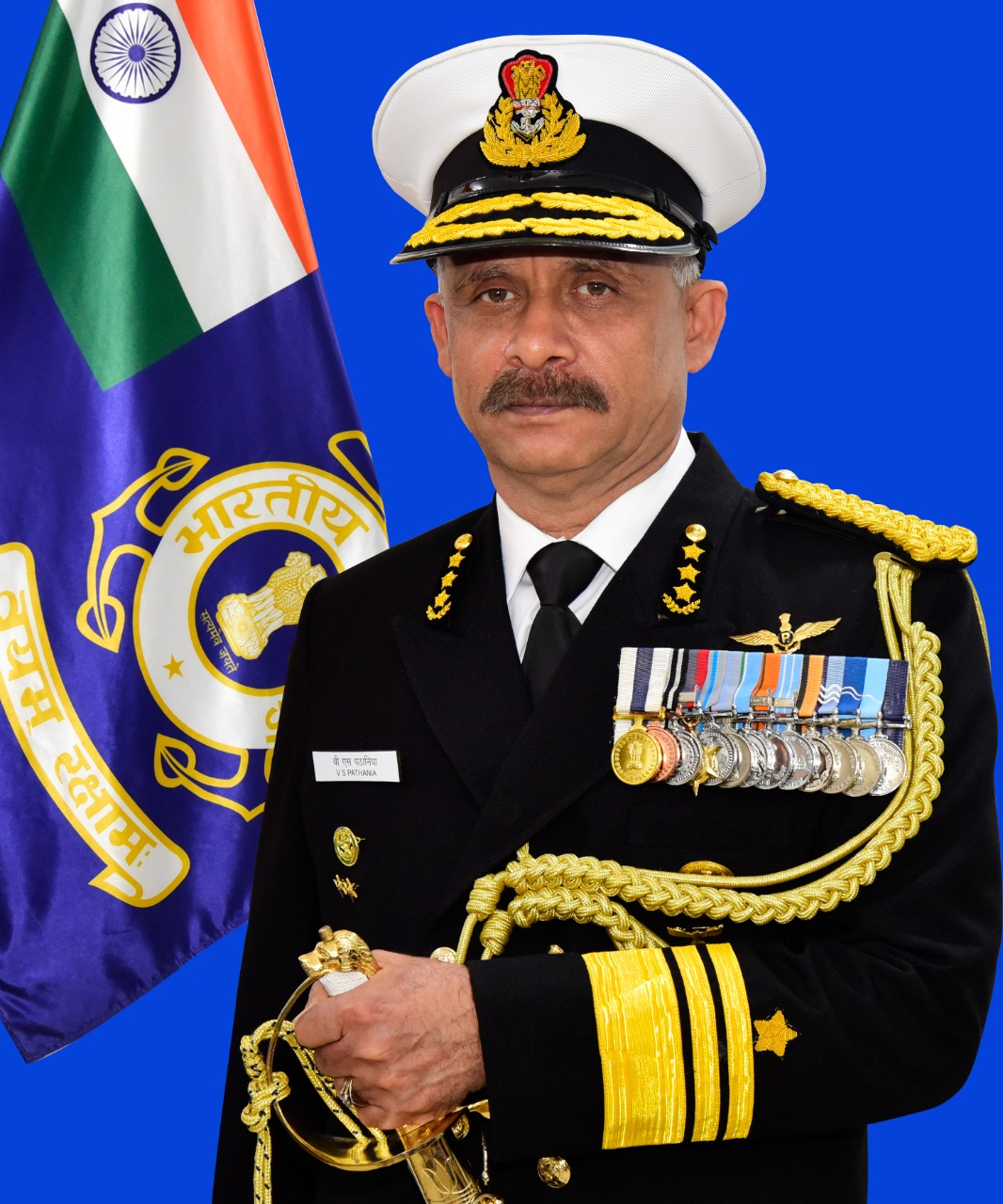
- Director General Virender Singh Pathania
- Born: 1 October 1963 (age 63)
- Military career
- Allegiance: India
- Branch: Indian Coast Guard
- Service years: 1986–2023
- Rank: Director General
- Unit: CGHQ
- Commands: Coast Guard Commander (Western Seaboard); Coast Guard Region (North West); Coast Guard Region (West); ICGS Ranijindan; ICGS Vigraha; ICGS Sarang
- Awards: President’s Tatrakshak Medal; Tatrakshak Medal

Virender Singh Pathania, PVSM, PTM, TM, is a retired Indian Coast Guard officer. He served as the 24th Director General of the Indian Coast Guard. He assumed the office on 31 December 2021 upon superannuation of Director General Krishnaswamy Natarajan. He is the first helicopter pilot to hold this position. Previously he served as Additional Director General of Indian Coast Guard and Coast Guard Commander of Western Seaboard.

== Career ==
In the course of a decorated career, VS Pathania commanded Indian Coast Guard vessels of all classes and was awarded President’s Tatrakshak Medal for Distinguished service, Tatrakshak Medal for Gallantry, and Director General's Commendation.

Pathania's tenure as Director General witnessed the milestone of having attained complete indigenization and a large-scale induction and operationalization of drones in the Indian Coast Guard.

Military offices
Preceded by Krishnaswamy Natarajan	Director General of the Indian Coast Guard; 2021 - 2023	Succeeded by Rakesh Pal
