= Rakesh Pal =

Indian coast guard chief (1965–2024)

Director General Rakesh Pal AVSM, PTM, TM
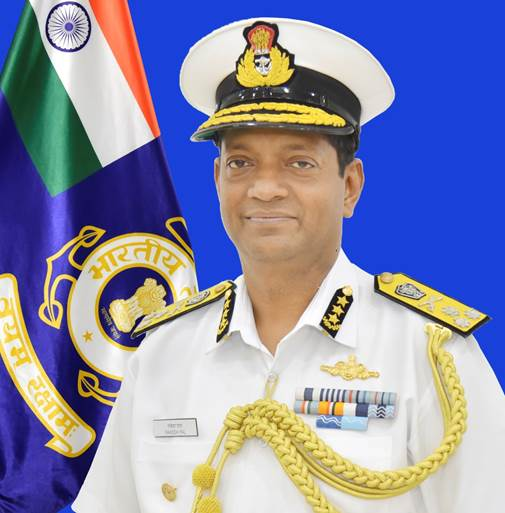
- Pal in 2023
- Born: 1965; Uttar Pradesh, India
- Died: 18 August 2024 (aged 58); Chennai, Tamil Nadu, India
- Military career
- Allegiance: India
- Branch: Indian Coast Guard
- Service years: 1989 – 2024
- Rank: Director General
- Commands: Coast Guard Region (Northwest); Coast Guard Station Okha; Coast Guard Station Vadinar; ICGS Samarth; ICGS Vijit; ICGS Sucheta Kripalani; ICGS Ahalyabai; ICGS C-03
- Awards: Ati Vishisht Seva Medal; President's Tatrakshak Medal; Tatrakshak Medal

Rakesh Pal, AVSM, PTM, TM (1965 – 18 August 2024) was a flag officer of the Indian Coast Guard. He served as the 25th Director General of the Indian Coast Guard. On 18 August 2024, he died in harness due to a heart attack.

== Early life and education ==
Pal hailed from Uttar Pradesh. After his schooling, he attended the Indian Naval Academy and joined the Indian Coast Guard (ICG) in January 1989.

== Career ==
Pal specialised in gunnery and weapons systems. He attended the gunnery school of the Indian Navy, INS Dronacharya in Kochi and was appointed First Gunner of the ICG.

Pal commanded all classes of ship in the Coast Guard. He commanded the interceptor boat ICGS C-03, the inshore patrol vessel ICGS Ahalyabai, and the fast patrol vessel ICGS ICGS Sucheta Kriplani. He also commanded the Vishwast-class offshore patrol vessel ICGS Vijit and the lead ship of the advance offshore patrol vessels class, ICGS Samarth. Pal also commanded Coast Guard Station Okha and Coast Guard Station Vadinar.

Pal had served both as the director of infrastructure and works, and as the principal director for administration at the Coast Guard headquarters in New Delhi.

=== Flag rank ===
On elevation to the flag rank, Pal was appointed Commander of the Coast Guard Northwest Region in Gandhinagar, Gujarat. As the region commander with rank of Inspector General, he was responsible for ICG's mandated charter including maritime surveillance of Gujarat, Daman, and Diu, coordination of coastal security with state governments and Maritime Search and Rescue. He later served as Deputy Director General for Policy and Plans at Coast Guard headquarters. In February 2022, he was promoted to a three-star rank and appointed Additional Director General Coast Guard, and in February 2023, he became Director General.

== Personal life and death ==
Pal was married to Dipa Pal, with whom he had two daughters, Snehal and Tarushi. He loved music and sports. On August 18, 2024, Pal died in harness due to a heart attack in Chennai, at the age of 58. He is survived by his wife and two daughters.

== Awards and decorations ==
Pal was awarded the Tatrakshak Medal in 2013 and the President's Tatrakshak Medal in 2018. On 26 January 2024, he was awarded the Ati Vishisht Seva Medal for distinguished service of an exceptional order.

Military offices
Preceded by Virender Singh Pathania	Director General of the Indian Coast Guard; 2023–2024	Succeeded by Paramesh Sivamani
