= Rajendra Singh Bisht =

Rajendra Singh, PTM, TM
- Born: 28 June 1959 (age 67); Mussoorie, Uttarakhand
- Spouse: Mrs Urmila Singh
- Military career
- Allegiance: India
- Branch: Indian Coast Guard
- Service years: 1980 - 1 July 2019
- Rank: Director General
- Commands: Western Region; Eastern Region
- Awards: President's Tatrakshak Medal; Tatrakshak Medal

Rajendra Singh, PTM, TM (born 28 June 1959) is a retired Indian Coast Guard officer who served as the 22nd Director General of the Indian Coast Guard. He was the first Indian Coast Officer to serve as the Director General of ICG. Prior to him the position of DG ICG was held by Vice Admiral ranked officer from the Indian Navy.

== Early life ==
Rajendra Singh hails from Uttarakhand and is born in a Rajput Family. He did his schooling from Mussoorie and graduation from Dehradun.

== Coast Guard career ==
Rajendra Singh joined the Indian Coast Guard in 1980. He has been one of the pioneers who charted the growth of the organization. As a Flag Officer he has commanded all the classes of ships in the inventory of the service.

He was trained in the Maritime Search and Rescue (M-SAR) and Maritime Safety with the United States Coast Guard. He has attended the National Security Course at the Lal Bahadur Shastri National Academy of Administration, Mussoorie. Having served in various capacities both afloat and ashore including in the areas of Operations, Administration, HR and Policy & Plans.

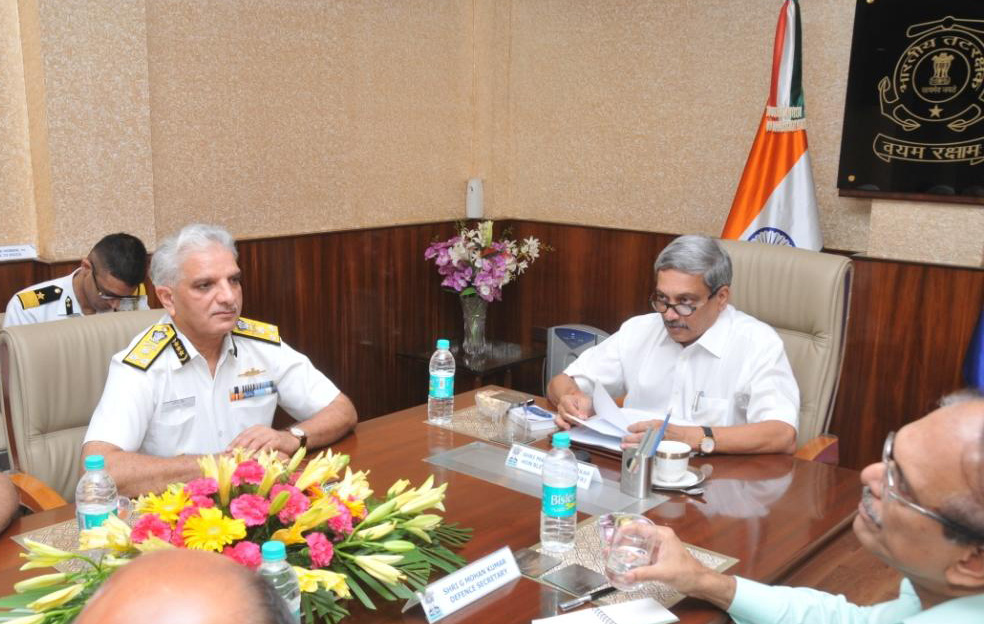

He was instrumental in consolidation of the administrative framework of the service and laying the foundation for expansion of the organization in a planned manner.

As an Inspector General, he had commanded both Eastern as well as the erstwhile undivided Western Region (which in itself implies having commanded more than 2/3rd of the operational fleet and units of the service). On the Eastern front, he led the ICG efforts in the Palk Bay at the peak of the ethnic strife, and on the West, he spearheaded the transformation of the service to counter challenges in the Coastal Security by implementing state of art Coastal Security Network.

As the Additional Director General of the Indian Coast Guard, he proficiently handled the conflicting demands in a continually enlarging charter of duties. The onerous responsibility included facilitating the organizational growth in an expeditious manner and providing impetus to achieve a high level of operational effectiveness.

== Awards and distinctions ==
2007 - President's Tatrakshak Medal (PTM)

1990 - Tatrakshak Medal (TM)

Military offices
Preceded by Harish Bisht	Director General of the Indian Coast Guard; 2016 - 2019	Succeeded by Krishnaswamy Natarajan
