= Paramesh Sivamani =

26th Director General of Indian Coast Guard

Director General Paramesh Sivamani AVSM, PTM, TM
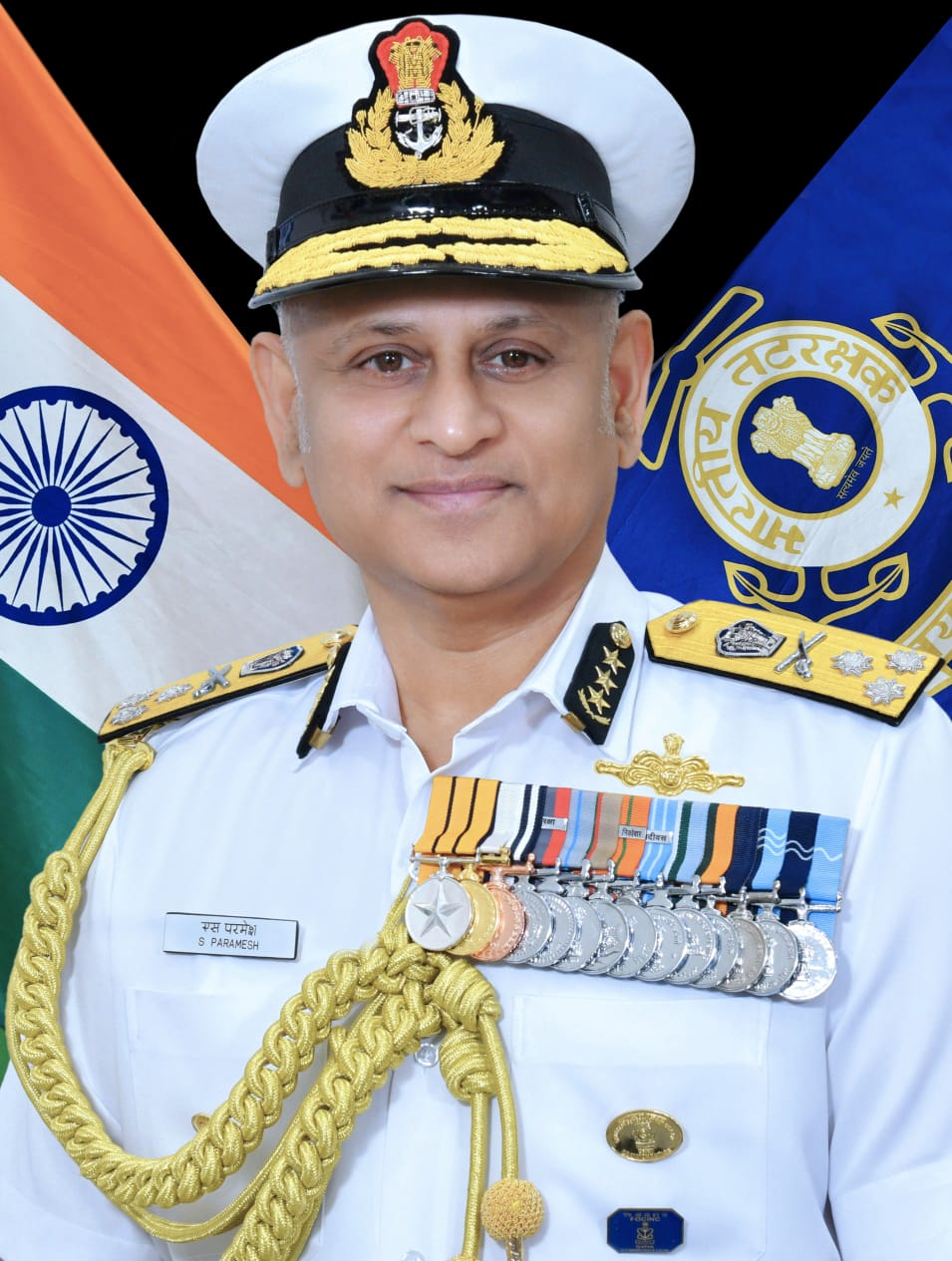
- Official Portrait
- Born: 1967 (age 58–59); Chennai, India
- Military career
- Allegiance: India
- Branch: Indian Coast Guard
- Service years: 1989 – Present
- Rank: Director General
- Commands: Additional Director General; Coast Guard Commander, Eastern Seaboard; Commander, Coast Guard Region (W); Commander, Coast Guard Region (E); Dy Director General (Ops & CS),CGHQ; Principal Director (Operations),CGHQ; Director (Operations), CGHQ; Chief Staff Officer (Operations); Coast Guard Region (East); ICGS Samar; ICGS Vishwast; ICGS Annie Besant; ICGS Avvaiyar
- Awards: Ati Vishisht Seva Medal; President's Tatrakshak Medal; Tatrakshak Medal

Paramesh Sivamani, AVSM, PTM, TM (born 1967) is a serving Flag Officer of the Indian Coast Guard. He currently serves as the 26th Director General of the Indian Coast Guard (ICG). Prior to his appointment, he served as the 7th Additional Director General of the Indian Coast Guard. He earlier served as the Coast Guard Commander (Eastern Seaboard), and as Commander Coast Guard Region (West) and Coast Guard Region (East).

== Career ==
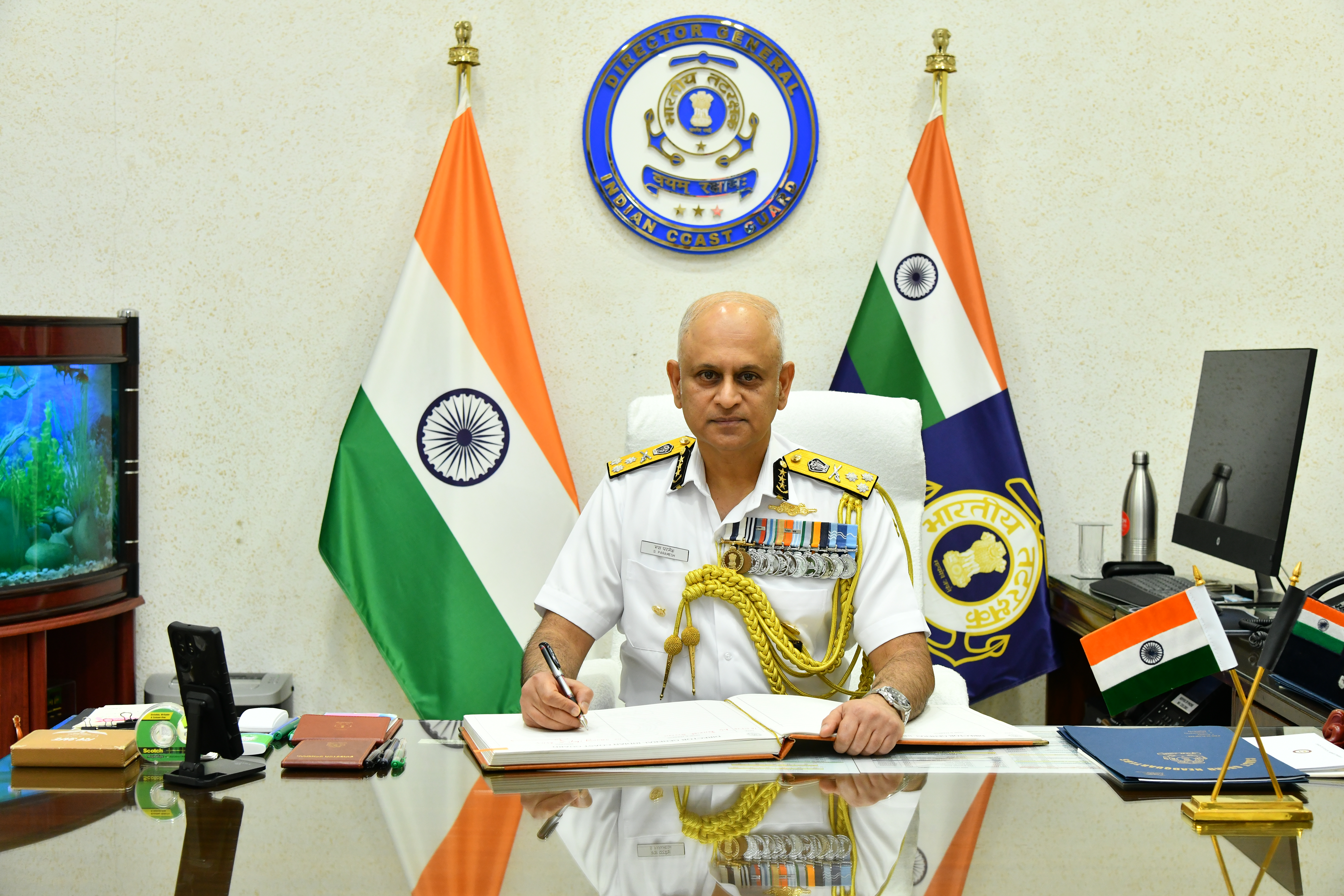
Paramesh Sivamani DG ICG 2024

Paramesh joined the Indian Coast Guard in July 1989. Over his career spanning more than three decades, he has held various ashore and afloat appointments. His commands at sea include major vessels of the Indian Coast Guard, such as the Advanced Offshore Patrol Vessel Samar and the Offshore Patrol Vessel Vishwast.

He has served in key leadership roles, including Coast Guard Commander (Eastern Seaboard), Commander of Coast Guard Region (West), and Commander of Coast Guard Region (East). Sivamani is an alumnus of the National Defence College, New Delhi, and the Defence Services Staff College, Wellington.

== Awards and decorations ==
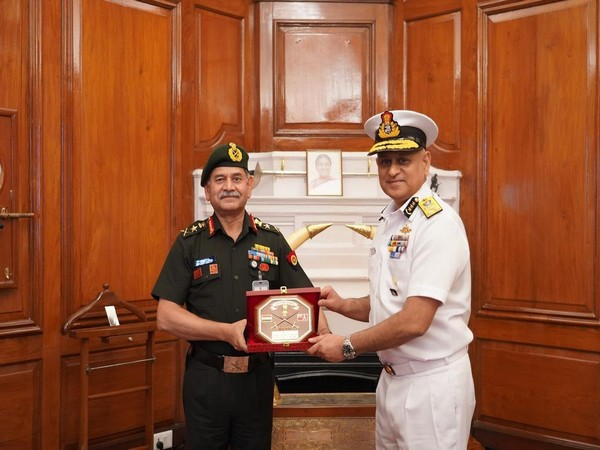
ICG DG Paramesh Sivamani with COAS Gen Upendra Dwivedi

Parmesh has been honored with several awards for his service, including the Ati Vishisht Seva Medal (2025), the President Tatrakshak Medal (2019), and the Tatrakshak Medal (2014). He has also received the Director General Coast Guard Commendation (2012) and the FOCINC (East) Commendation (2009).

== Personal life ==
Paramesh is married to Priya, and the couple has a son named Pranav.

Military offices
Preceded by Rakesh Pal	Director General of the Indian Coast Guard; 2024 - Present	Succeeded by Incumbent
