= Walking with the Comrades =

2011 book by Arundhati Roy

- Author: Arundhati Roy
- Language: English
- Subject: Naxalite–Maoist insurgency
- Genre: non-fiction
- Publisher: Penguin Publishing
- Publication date: 25 October 2011
- Pages: 220
- ISBN: 978-0-14-312059-9

Walking with the Comrades (2011) is an eyewitness account of the Naxalite–Maoist insurgency by Indian author Arundhati Roy. The book covers her time in 2010 spent living with Naxalite communist guerillas deep within the forests of rural Chhattisgarh. She argues that India's counter-insurgency, known as Operation Green Hunt, is a front for mining corporations to clear away tribal people, and to make profits exploit India's natural resources.

== Summary ==
After meeting a with her Naxalite contact, Roy starts her long journey deep into the jungles of Chhattisgarh, but not before sharing her thoughts on Operation Green Hunt and life within Indian government-controlled town of Dantewada.

In Dantewada the police wear plain clothes and the rebels wear uniforms. The jail superintendent is in jail. The prisoners are free (three hundred escaped from the old town jail two years ago). Women who have been raped are in police custody. The rapists give speeches in the bazaar.

Between descriptions of what she saw, who she met, and conversations with tribals and communists, the book explores background information to the conflict. Such subjects include the theft of tribal land by the Indian government, Israel's support for Operation Green Hunt, communist involvements in labour disputes, Hindu missionaries, the caste system, women's rights, and the treatment of cows. When not describing background information and her own eyewitness accounts, the book strays into Roy's personal thoughts and feelings on what she has seen. She also often talks about human rights abuses at the hands of the Indian government's police and soldiers, including attacks against trade unions, rapes, and killing of civilians. During her time with the Naxalites, she met soldiers of the People's Liberation Guerrilla Army (PLGA), whom she described as "heavy hitters" who carry "serious rifles". Roy described the most surprising she learned during her time with the Naxalites was that 45% of the PLGA were women, many of whom joined the communists after witnessing attacks on their villages by the Indian government and vigilante groups. However, she described the Maoist organisations as still very patriarchal.

I believed that when people take up arms, the violence would inevitably turn against the women in the community. In the forest I was disabused of this notion—45% of the Peoples Liberation Guerrilla Army is made up of women. Many of them joined after watching the brutal attacks of the police and the government sponsored vigilante groups on their villages.

== Reception ==
The reception for Walking with the Comrades was overwhelmingly positive, with reviews coming from the Washington Post, Kirkus Reviews, Publishers Weekly, Library Journal, and Firstpost.

Chandrahas Choudhury of the Washington Post describes the book as a "riveting account of the face-off in the forests of central India between the Indian state and the Maoists or Naxalites, a shadowy, revolutionary guerrilla force with tens of thousands of cadres." Choudhury describes Roy as "one of India's most distinctive voices".

Kirkus Reviews gave another positive review, describing Walking with the Comrades as a "bell-clear exposé of corporate greed and governmental malfeasance".

Publishers Weekly praised the book for its balanced view, and for setting modern events within their proper historical context.

Library Journal gave a mixed yet generally positive review, describing the book as a "one-sided but absorbing and eye-opening read."

First Post described Walking with Comrades as a "must read", while reporting on Sundaranar University's removal of the book from their postgraduate English syllabus.
