= Tatrakshak Medal =

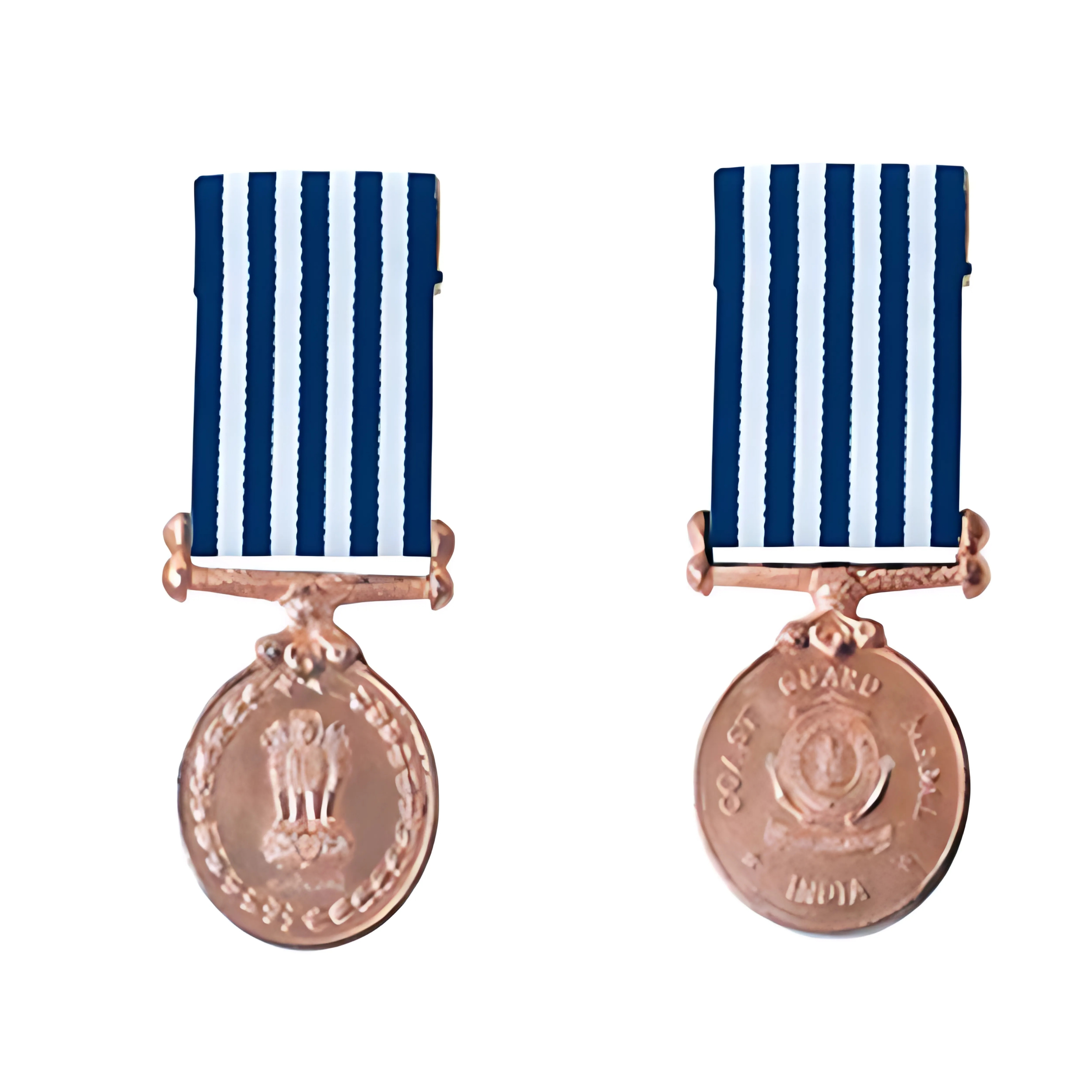
- The Tatrakshak Medal or Coast Guard Medal
- Type: Medal
- Awarded for: Conspicuous devotion to duty or courage
- Country: Republic of India
- Presented by: President of India
- Eligibility: Indian Coast Guard
- Status: Active
- Established: 7 June 1989
- First award: 26 January 1990
- Final award: 26 January 2023

Precedence
- Next (higher): President's Tatarakshak Medal for Distinguished Service
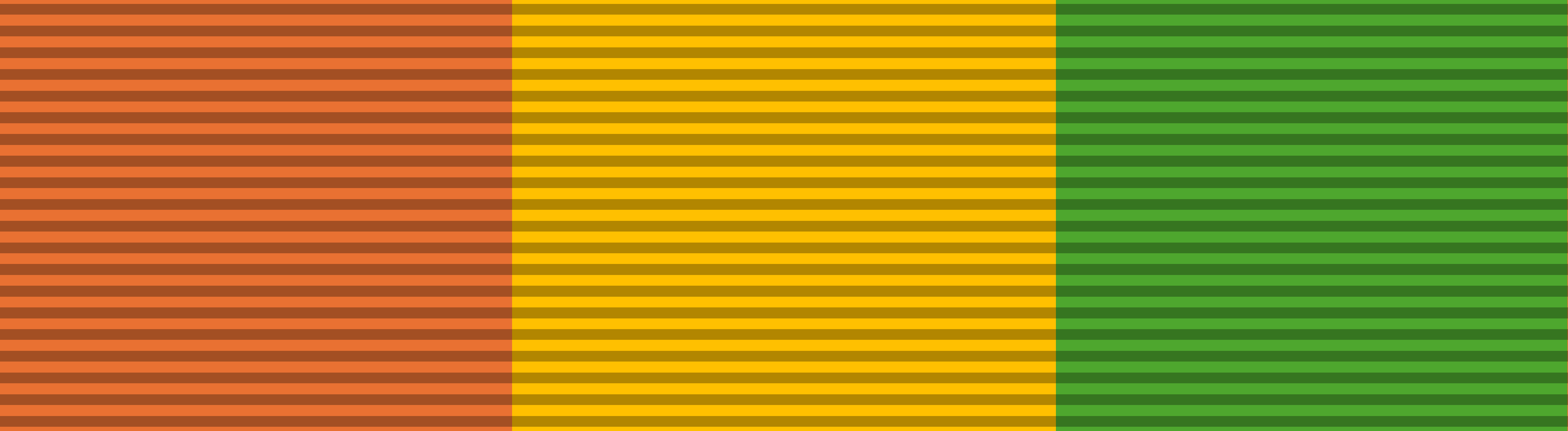
- Equivalent: Medal for Gallantry
- Next (lower): Tatrakshak Medal for Meritorious Service

The Tatrakshak Medal or Coast Guard Medal is an Indian military decoration, awarded for conspicuous devotion to duty or courage in Indian Coast Guard. It is conferred by the President of India every year on the occasion of national celebrations - the Independence Day and the Republic Day.

== History ==
The Tatrakshak Medal was instituted on 7 June 1989 by the President of India to recognise individual acts of exceptional devotion to duty or courage in the Indian Coast Guard service. The first award was conferred on 26 January 1990.

== Description ==
All ranks of the Coast Guard are eligible for the medal. If a recipient of the medal is subsequently awarded the medal again, every such further award shall be recognized by the addition of a Bar. For every such Bar, a miniature insignia of a pattern approved by the Government shall be added to the riband when worn alone. The medal may be awarded posthumously.

The Tatrakshak medal may be awarded for meritorious service as well as gallantry. A maximum of five such medals are awarded each year. There is no annual limit on the number of gallantry medals.

The Medal for gallantry is worn next to and immediately after the President's Tatrakshak Medal for distinguished service.
