= President's Tatrakshak Medal =

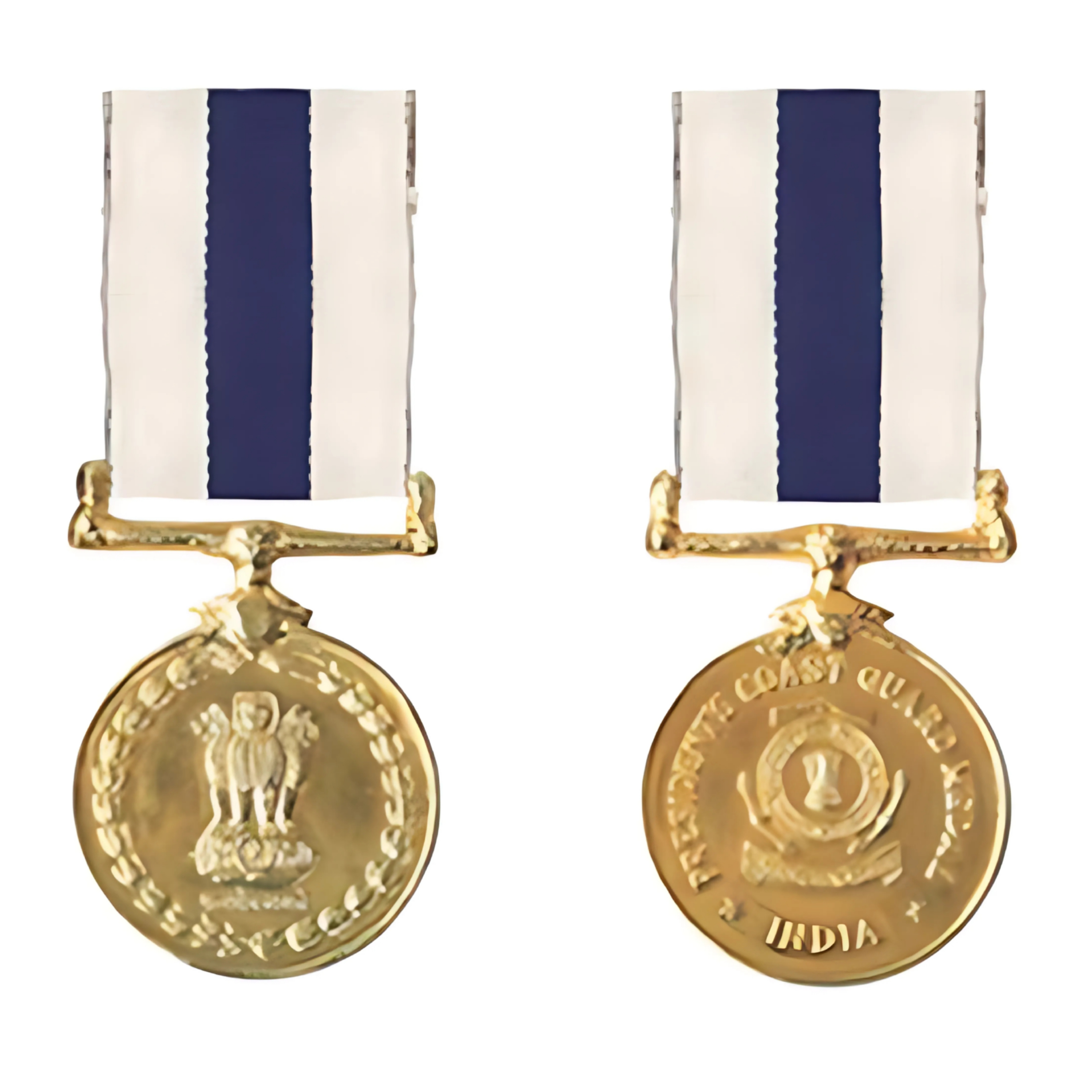
- The President's Tatrakshak Medal or President's Coast Guard Medal
- Type: Medal
- Awarded for: Conspicuous gallantry, selfless devotion, distinguished and meritorious service
- Country: Republic of India
- Presented by: President of India
- Eligibility: Indian Coast Guard
- Status: Active
- Established: 7 June 1989
- First award: 26 January 1990
- Final award: 26 January 2023

Precedence
- Next (higher): President's Tatrakshak Medal for Gallantry
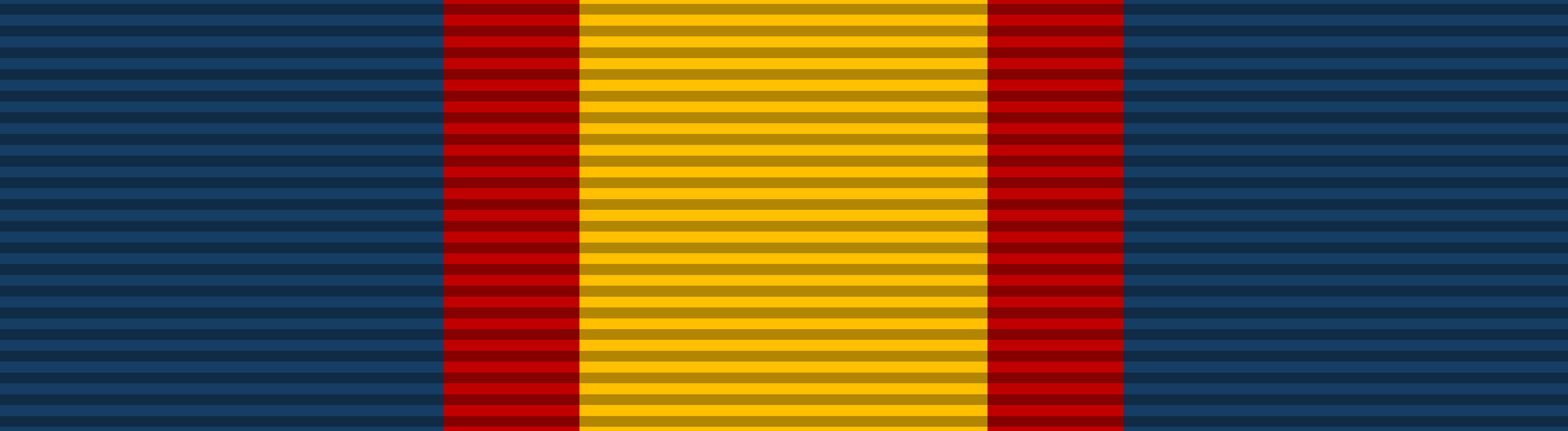
- Equivalent: President's Medal for Distinguished Service
- Next (lower): Tatarakshak Medal for Gallantry

The President's Tatrakshak Medal or President's Coast Guard Medal is an Indian military decoration, awarded for exceptional devotion to duty or courage in Indian Coast Guard. It is conferred by the President of India every year on the occasion of national celebrations - the Independence Day and the Republic Day.

== History ==
The President's Tatrakshak Medal was instituted on 7 June 1989 by the President of India with a view to recognising individual acts of exceptional devotion to duty or courage as have special significance for the Indian Coast Guard. The first award was conferred on 26 January 1990.

== Eligibility ==
All ranks of the Coast Guard are eligible for the medal. If a recipient of the medal is subsequently awarded the medal again, every such further award shall be recognized by a Bar to be attached to the riband by which the medal is suspended. For every such Bar, a miniature insignia of a pattern approved by the Government shall be added to the riband when worn alone. The medal may be awarded posthumously.

== Criteria ==
The President's Tatrakshak medal may be awarded for distinguished service as well as gallantry. The number of medals awarded for distinguished service in any one year shall not exceed Two. There is no limit on the number of medals to be awarded for gallantry in any one year.

The medal shall be awarded:

- For such individual acts of exceptional courage performed within or outside the territory of INDIA which have special significance for the Coast Guard.
- Success in the conduct of Coast Guard operations under difficult conditions such as weather or limitations of ships/boats or equipments.
- Special service as in prevention or checking of smuggling, poaching or safeguarding of national interests in the Maritime Zones of India.
- Prolonged service but only when distinguished by very exceptional ability and merit.

== Design ==
The medal is circular in shape, one and three-eighth inches in diameter, and made of silver with gold gilt. On the obverse is embossed the design of the Coast Guard Crest in the centre and words "President's Coast Guard Medal" above and "India" below, along the edge of the medal separated by two five pointed heraldic stars. On the reverse, the State Emblem of India is embossed in the centre and a wreath joined by a plain clasp at the top along the upper edge. On the rim, the name of the person to whom the medal has been awarded, is inscribed.

The medal is suspended from the left breast and the riband, of an inch and three-eighth in width, is Silver White with Navy Blue Band in the middle dividing it in three equal parts. The Bar is to the riband by which the medal is suspended. When the riband is worn alone, a small silver rose with gold gilt shall be attached thereto for every bar which is awarded.
