= Indian Coast Guard =

Maritime security force of India

- Indian Coast Guard crest

- Racing stripe

- Ensign
- Abbreviation: ICG
- Motto: वयम् रक्षामः (Sanskrit); Vayam Rakṣāmaḥ (ISO); We Protect

Agency overview
- Formed: 18 August 1978; 48 years ago
- Employees: 13,842 sanctioned strength (2018–19)
- Annual budget: ₹9,676 crore (US$1.0 billion)
- Legal personality: Law enforcement

Jurisdictional structure
- Operations jurisdiction: India
- Governing body: Government of India
- Constituting instrument: The Coast Guard Act, 1978
- Specialist jurisdiction: Coastal patrol, marine border protection, marine search and rescue

Operational structure
- Headquarters: Indian Coast Guard Headquarters, New Delhi
- Minister responsible: Rajnath Singh, Minister of Defence
- Agency executive: Paramesh Sivamani, Director General
- Parent agency: Ministry of Defence

Facilities
- Boats: 4 pollution control vessels; 25 offshore patrol vessels; 49 fast patrol vessels; 82 patrol boats; 28 patrol craft; 14 hovercraft; 06 Aux barge
- Planes: 77 aircraft

Notables
- Anniversary: Coast Guard Day: 1 February

Website
- indiancoastguard.gov.in

The Indian Coast Guard (ICG) is a maritime law enforcement and search and rescue agency for India with jurisdiction over its territorial waters, including its contiguous zone and exclusive economic zone. It was started in February 1977 and formally established in August 1978 by the Coast Guard Act, 1978 of the Parliament of India. It operates under the Ministry of Defence.

The ICG works in close cooperation with the Indian Navy, the Department of Fisheries, the Department of Revenue (Customs), and the Coastal Police of the State Police Forces, and the Central Armed Police Forces.

== History ==
The establishment of the Indian Coast Guard was first proposed by the Indian Navy to provide non-military maritime services to the nation. In the 1960s, sea-borne smuggling of goods was threatening to destroy India's domestic economy. The Indian Customs Department frequently called upon the Indian Navy for assistance with patrol and interception in the anti-smuggling effort.

The Nagchaudhuri Committee was constituted with participation from the Indian Navy and the Indian Air Force to study the problem. In August 1971, the committee identified the requirement to patrol India's vast coastline, set up a registry of offshore fishing vessels to identify illegal activity, and establish a capable and well-equipped force to intercept vessels engaged in illegal activities. The committee also looked at the number and nature of the equipment, infrastructure, and personnel required to provide those services.

Indian Coast Guard promotional movie launched on the eve of 46th raising day

By 1973, India had started a program to acquire the equipment and started deputing personnel from the Indian Navy for these anti-smuggling and law enforcement tasks, under the provisions of the Maintenance of Internal Security Act. The Indian Navy sensed that the law enforcement nature of these duties diverged from its core mission as a military service. Admiral Sourendra Nath Kohli, then Chief of Naval Staff, made a recommendation to the Defence Secretary, outlining the need for a separate maritime service to undertake those duties and offering the Navy's assistance in its establishment. In August 1974, the Defence Secretary submitted a note to the Cabinet Secretary proposing cabinet action on Admiral Kohli's recommendation.

As a result, in September 1974, the Indian cabinet set up the Rustamji Committee, under the chairmanship of Khusro Faramurz Rustamji, with participation from the Navy, the Air Force and the Department of Revenue to examine gaps in security and law enforcement between the roles of the Indian Navy and the central and state police forces. The discovery of oil off Bombay High further emphasized the need for a maritime law enforcement and protection service.

In July 1975, the committee submitted its recommendation for the establishment of the Indian Coast Guard under the Ministry of Defence. Bureaucratic wrangling followed, with the Cabinet Secretary making a recommendation to place the service under the Ministry of Home Affairs. Then Prime Minister Indira Gandhi overruled the Cabinet Secretary and decided to accept the original recommendation of the Rustamji Committee to place the service under the Ministry of Defence.

In February 1977, an interim Indian Coast Guard came into being, equipped with two small corvettes and five patrol boats transferred from the Navy. The duties and functions of the service were defined in the Coast Guard Act, which was passed by India's parliament in August 1978 and came into immediate effect. Vice Admiral V. A. Kamath of the Indian Navy was appointed the founding Director-General. Prime Minister Morarji Desai inspected the Guard of Honor at the service's inauguration. In 1984, Vice Admiral Kamath proposed a five-year plan to develop the ICG into a potent force. The full potential of this plan was not immediately realized due to an economic resource crunch.

One of the historic operational successes of the ICG occurred in October 1999, with the recapture at high seas of a Panamanian-registered Japanese cargo ship, MV Alondra Rainbow, hijacked off Indonesia. Her crew was rescued off Phuket, Thailand. The ship had been repainted as MV Mega Rama, and was spotted off Kochi, heading towards Pakistan. She was chased by ICGS Tarabai and INS Prahar (K98) of the Indian Navy and apprehended. It was the first successful prosecution of armed pirates in over a century.

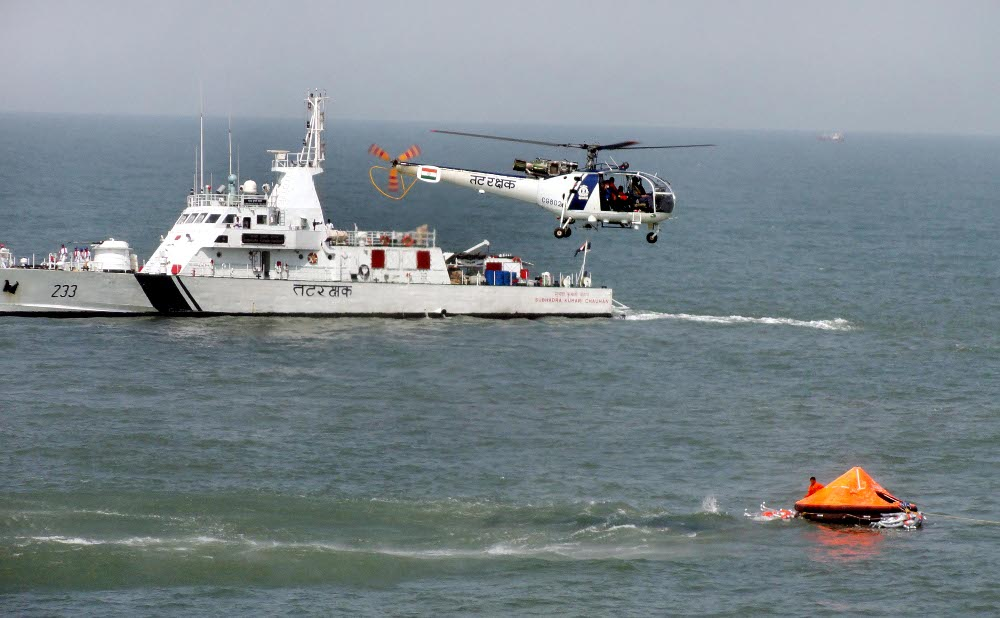
Indian Coast Guard ship and helicopter during the Search and Rescue Workshop and Exercise (SAREX), 2014

The Indian Coast Guard conducts exercises with the other coast guards of the world. In May 2005, the ICG agreed to establish liaison links with the Pakistan Maritime Security Agency (PMSA). In 2006, the Indian Coast Guard conducted exercises with its Japanese and Korean counterparts.

After the 2008 Mumbai attacks in which the terrorists entered India from Pakistan via the sea route, the Indian government initiated a program to expand the ICG force, assets, and infrastructure for enhanced protection and surveillance of Indian waters. The force aims to have 200 ships and 100 twin-engine aircraft by 2030 in its fleet. As of January 2025, ICG deploys 55 to 60 ships and 10 to 12 aircraft daily.

== Present scenario ==
=== Present role ===
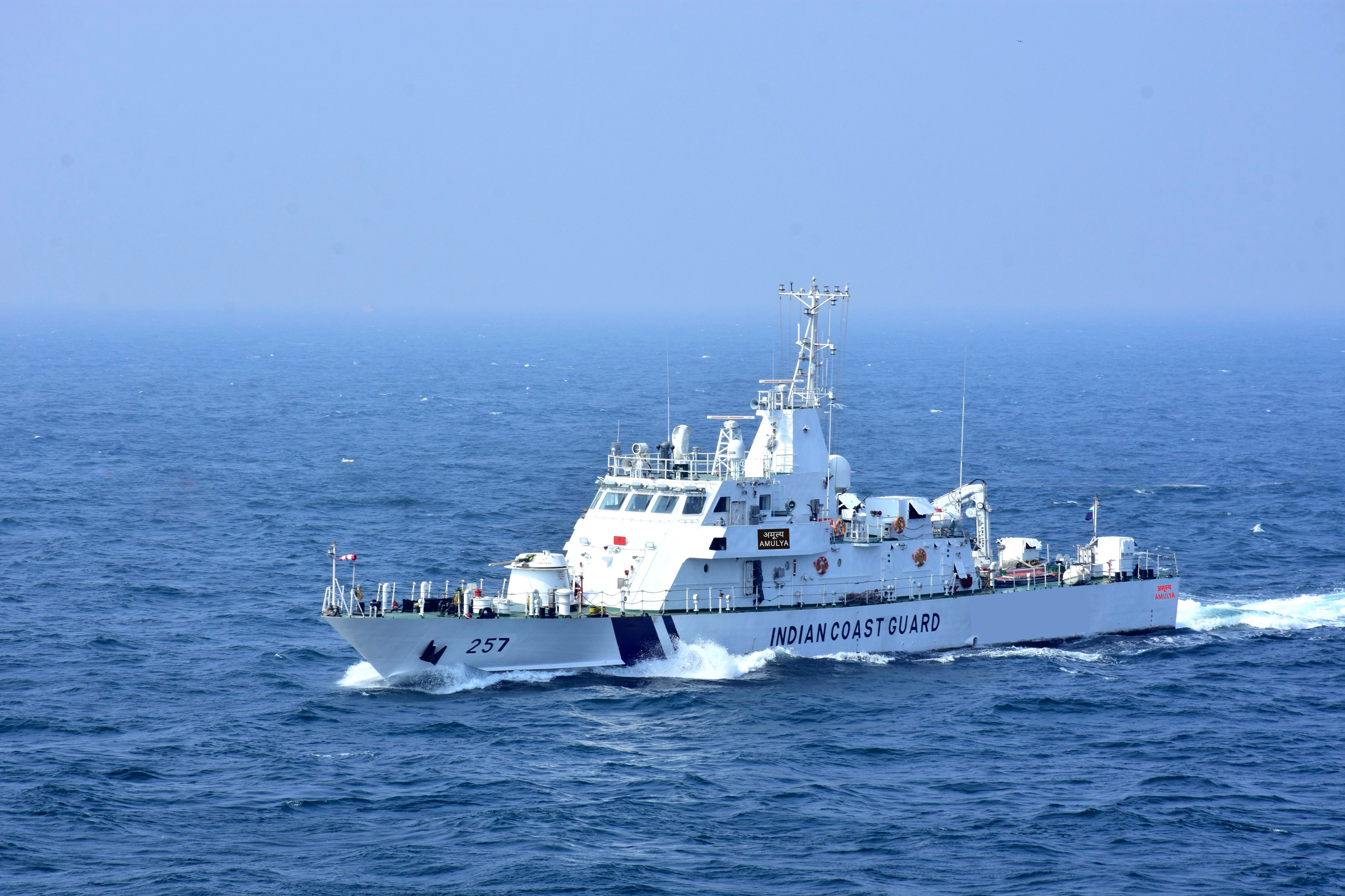
ICGS Amulya on patrol.

The Indian Coast Guard's motto is "वयम रक्षामः" (Vayam Rakshamah), which translates from Sanskrit as "We Protect".

Missions of Indian Coast Guard:

- Safety and protection of artificial islands, offshore terminals, and other installations
- Protection and assistance to fishermen and mariners at sea
- Preservation and protection of marine ecology and environment including pollution control
- Assistance to the Department of Customs and other authorities in anti-smuggling operations
- Law enforcement in territorial as well as international waters
- Scientific data collection and support
- National defense during hostilities (under the operational control of the Indian Navy)

Additional responsibilities of the Indian Coast Guard:

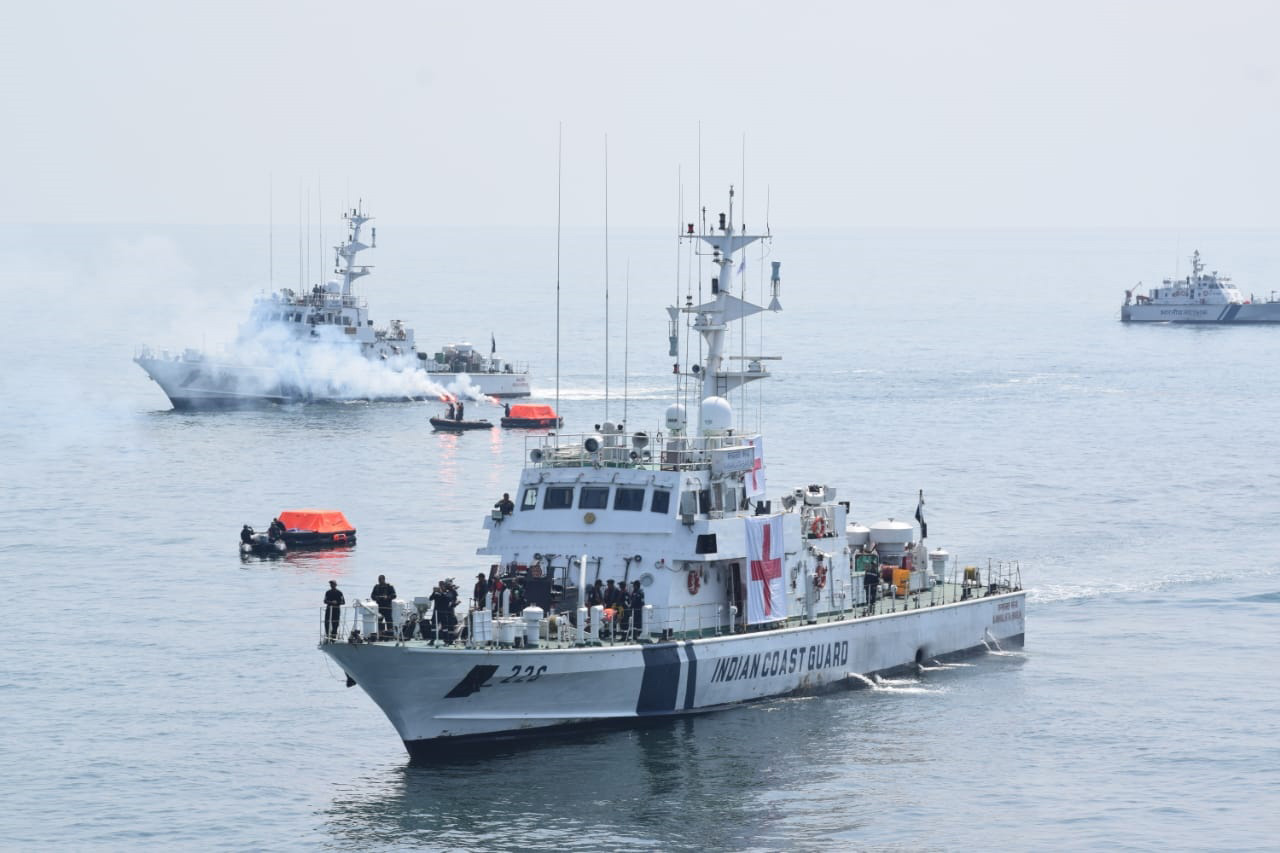
The Indian Coast Guard conducting Regional Search and Rescue (SAR) exercise at Kakinada, in Andhra Pradesh,2023.

- Offshore Security Coordination Committee (OSCC) – The Director-General of the Indian Coast Guard is the Chairman of OSCC, constituted by the Ministry of Petroleum and Natural Gas (MoPNG), of which the Flag Officer Defence Advisory Group is a member.
- National Maritime Search and Rescue Coordinating Authority (NMSARCA) – The Director-General of the Indian Coast Guard is the NMSARCA for executing/coordinating search and rescue (SAR) missions
- Lead Intelligence Agency (LIA) – For coastal and sea borders
- Coastal Security – The Director-General of the Indian Coast Guard is the commander of coastal command and is responsible for overall coordination between central and state agencies in all matters relating to coastal security

=== Leadership and organization ===
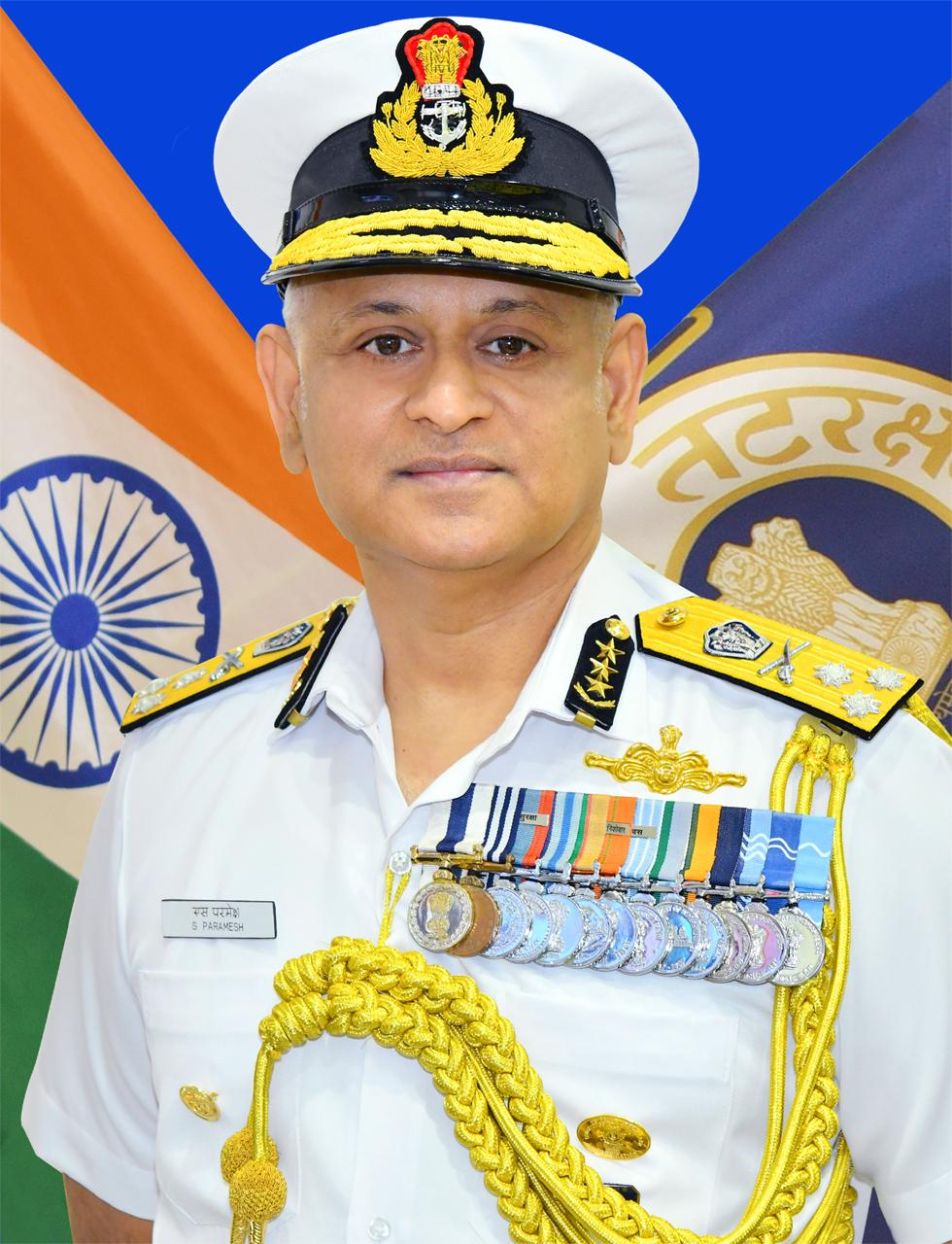
26th Director General of Indian Coast Guard Paramesh Sivamani

The Indian Coast Guard organization is headed by the Director-General (DG ICG), who is located at Coast Guard Headquarters (CGHQ), New Delhi. At CGHQ, he is assisted by the Additional Director General Coast Guard (ADGCG) of the rank of ADG, four Deputy Director-Generals of the rank of Inspector-General, and other senior officers heading staff divisions.

Director General Paramesh Sivamani is the 26th Director General of the Indian Coast Guard. The rank of Director General is equivalent to a Vice Admiral of Indian Navy.

The Indian Coast Guard has the Western and Eastern Seaboard, both commanded by three-star officers designated Coast Guard Commander Western Seaboard and Coast Guard Commander Eastern Seaboard. The seaboards are divided into four regions. A fifth region, the Andaman & Nicobar Region, reports directly to the DGICG.

Each region is headed by an officer of the rank of Inspector-General. Each of the regions is further divided into multiple districts, typically covering a coastal state or a union territory.

Coast Guard Seaboards	HQ location	Seaboard Commander
Western Seaboard	Mumbai	ADG M.V Pathak,PTM, TM
Eastern Seaboard	Visakapatanam	ADG Donny Michael, AVSM, PTM, TM

Coast Guard regions	Regional HQ location	Regional commander
North-West Region (NW)	Gandhinagar	IG T Sashi Kumar, TM
Western Region (W)	Mumbai	IG Bhisham Sharma, PTM TM
Eastern Region (E)	Chennai	IG Y Dhaka, TM
North-East Region (NE)	Kolkata	IG IS Chauhan, TM
Andaman & Nicobar Region (A&N)	Port Blair	IG Neeraj Tiwari, TM

As of 2023, the Indian Coast Guard operates:

- 42 Coast Guard Stations
- 5 Coast Guard Air Stations
- 10 Coast Guard Air Enclaves

== Organization ==
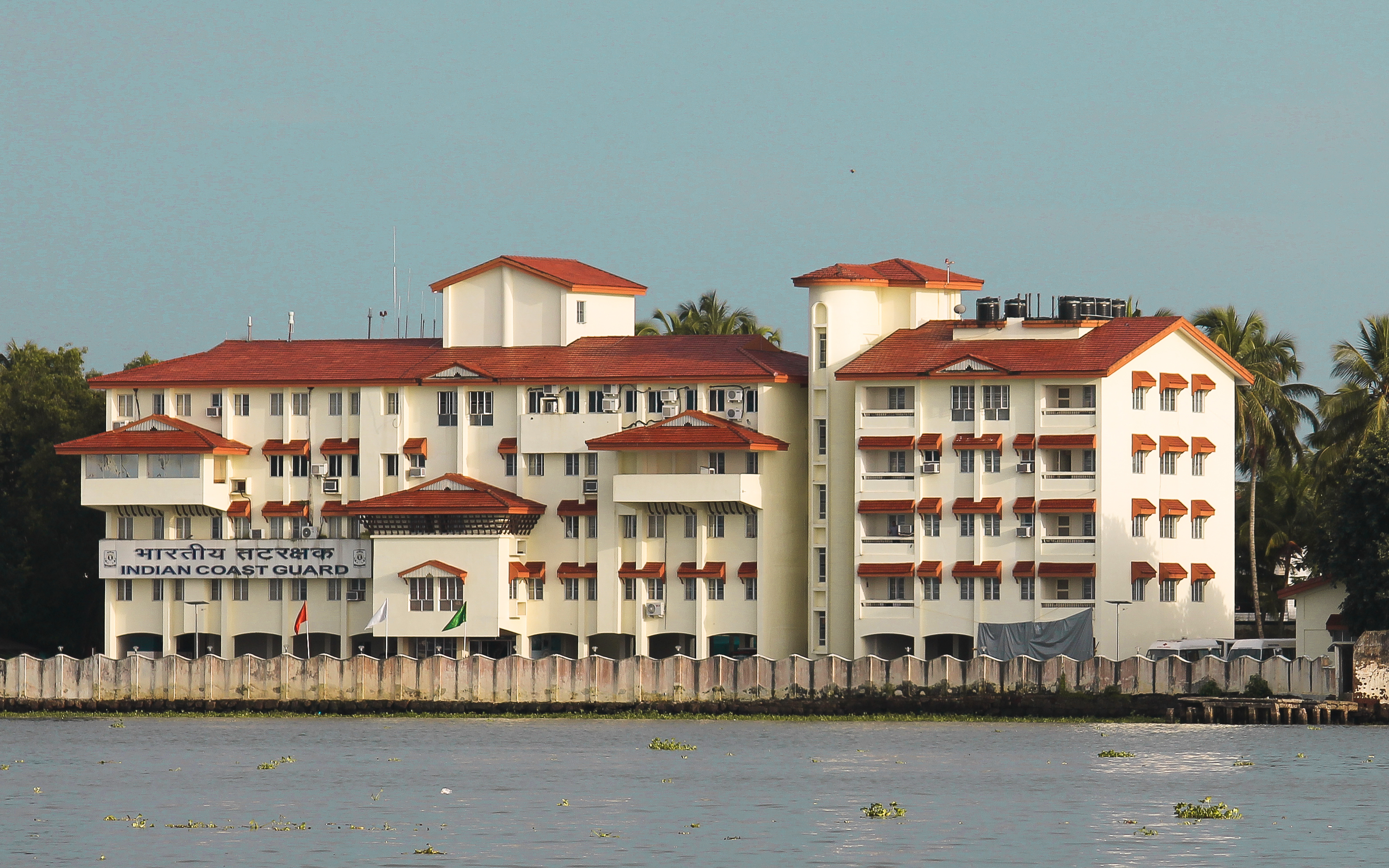
Coast Guard DHQ-4 Headquarters in Kochi, Kerala

In 2016, there were 42 Coast Guard stations along the Indian coastline.

Indian Coast Guard is responsible for the execution of Search and Rescue (SAR) operations in the Indian Search and Rescue Region (ISRR). To serve this purpose, ICG operates 3 Maritime Rescue Coordination Centres (MRCC) in Mumbai, Chennai and Port Blair and 36 Maritime Rescue Sub Centres (MRSC/MRCSC), which operates under their respective MRCCs.

In November 2024, the Indian Coast Guard and the Telecommunications Consultants India (TICL) laid the foundation of a full-fledged "Tier-3" Data Centre at Mahipalpur, Delhi. The construction will take 2 years. The project worth ₹588 crore (equivalent to ₹626 crore or US$67 million in 2026) (including 5-year operational expenditure (opex) and a 2-year hardware warranty) will be carried out by TCIL, Yotta Infrastructure, and Attero, a software solution company. This will help ICG for Command and Control over their 109 offices and 88 ships at once.

Regional HQ	District HQ	Coast Guard Station
North-East Region (NE) CGRHQ Kolkata	CGRHQ	ICGS Kolkata
North-East Region (NE) CGRHQ Kolkata	CGRHQ	CGAE Kolkata (700 Squadron)
North-East Region (NE) CGRHQ Kolkata	DHQ-7 Paradip	ICGS Paradip
North-East Region (NE) CGRHQ Kolkata	DHQ-7 Paradip	ICGS Gopalpur
North-East Region (NE) CGRHQ Kolkata	DHQ-7 Paradip	CGAE Bhubaneswar (743 Squadron)
North-East Region (NE) CGRHQ Kolkata	DHQ-8 Haldia	ICGS Haldia
North-East Region (NE) CGRHQ Kolkata	DHQ-8 Haldia	ICGS Frazerganj (includes FOB)
North-East Region (NE) CGRHQ Kolkata	DHQ-8 Haldia	CGAE Kolkata (700 Squadron)
Eastern Region (E) CGRHQ Chennai	DHQ-5 Chennai	CGAS Chennai (848, 744 Squadron)
Eastern Region (E) CGRHQ Chennai	DHQ-5 Chennai	ICGS Chennai (includes MRCC and RMPC (Note: Regional Maritime Pollution Response Centre))
Eastern Region (E) CGRHQ Chennai	DHQ-6 Visakhapatnam	ICGS Visakhapatnam
Eastern Region (E) CGRHQ Chennai	DHQ-6 Visakhapatnam	ICGS Kakinada
Eastern Region (E) CGRHQ Chennai	DHQ-6 Visakhapatnam	ICGS Krishnapatnam
Eastern Region (E) CGRHQ Chennai	DHQ-6 Visakhapatnam	ICGS Nizampatnam
Eastern Region (E) CGRHQ Chennai	DHQ-6 Visakhapatnam	CGAE Visakhapatnam (Proposed)
Eastern Region (E) CGRHQ Chennai	DHQ-13 Puducherry	ICGS Puducherry
Eastern Region (E) CGRHQ Chennai	DHQ-13 Puducherry	CGAE Puducherry
Eastern Region (E) CGRHQ Chennai	DHQ-13 Puducherry	ICGS Karaikal
Eastern Region (E) CGRHQ Chennai	DHQ-16 Thoothukudi	ICGS Thoothukudi
Eastern Region (E) CGRHQ Chennai	DHQ-16 Thoothukudi	ICGS Mandapam
Eastern Region (E) CGRHQ Chennai	DHQ-16 Thoothukudi	CGAS Thoothukudi (Land acquisition in-progress)
Andaman & Nicobar Region (A&N) CGRHQ Port Blair	DHQ-14 Port Blair	ICGS Port Blair (includes MRCC)
Andaman & Nicobar Region (A&N) CGRHQ Port Blair	DHQ-14 Port Blair	CGAE Port Blair
Andaman & Nicobar Region (A&N) CGRHQ Port Blair	DHQ-14 Port Blair	ICGS Hutbay
Andaman & Nicobar Region (A&N) CGRHQ Port Blair	DHQ-9 Diglipur	ICGS Mayabunder
Andaman & Nicobar Region (A&N) CGRHQ Port Blair	DHQ-9 Diglipur	ICGS Diglipur
Andaman & Nicobar Region (A&N) CGRHQ Port Blair	DHQ-10 Campbell Bay	ICGS Campbell Bay
Andaman & Nicobar Region (A&N) CGRHQ Port Blair	DHQ-10 Campbell Bay	ICGS Kamorta
Western Region (W) CGRHQ Mumbai	DHQ-3 New Mangaluru	ICGS Karwar
Western Region (W) CGRHQ Mumbai	DHQ-3 New Mangaluru	CGAE New Mangaluru
Western Region (W) CGRHQ Mumbai	DHQ-2 Mumbai	ICGS Murud Janjira
Western Region (W) CGRHQ Mumbai	DHQ-2 Mumbai	ICGS Ratnagiri
Western Region (W) CGRHQ Mumbai	DHQ-2 Mumbai	ICGS Dahanu
Western Region (W) CGRHQ Mumbai	DHQ-4 Kochi	ICGS Vizhinjam
Western Region (W) CGRHQ Mumbai	DHQ-4 Kochi	ICGS Beypore
Western Region (W) CGRHQ Mumbai	DHQ-4 Kochi	CGAE Kochi
Western Region (W) CGRHQ Mumbai	DHQ-11 Mormugao	ICGS Goa
Western Region (W) CGRHQ Mumbai	DHQ-11 Mormugao	CGAE Dabolim
Western Region (W) CGRHQ Mumbai	DHQ-12 Kavaratti	ICGS Kavaratti
Western Region (W) CGRHQ Mumbai	DHQ-12 Kavaratti	ICGS Minicoy
Western Region (W) CGRHQ Mumbai	DHQ-12 Kavaratti	ICGS Androth
Western Region (W) CGRHQ Mumbai	DHQ-12 Kavaratti	CGAS Daman
North-West Region (NW) CGRHQ Gandhinagar	DHQ-1 Porbandar	ICGS Gandhinagar
North-West Region (NW) CGRHQ Gandhinagar	DHQ-1 Porbandar	ICGS Pipavav
North-West Region (NW) CGRHQ Gandhinagar	DHQ-1 Porbandar	ICGS Veraval
North-West Region (NW) CGRHQ Gandhinagar	DHQ-1 Porbandar	CGAE Porbandar
North-West Region (NW) CGRHQ Gandhinagar	DHQ-15 Okha	ICGS Mundra
North-West Region (NW) CGRHQ Gandhinagar	DHQ-15 Okha	ICGS Jakhau
North-West Region (NW) CGRHQ Gandhinagar	DHQ-15 Okha	ICGS Vadinar
North-West Region (NW) CGRHQ Gandhinagar	DHQ-15 Okha	ICGS Okha

== Personnel ==
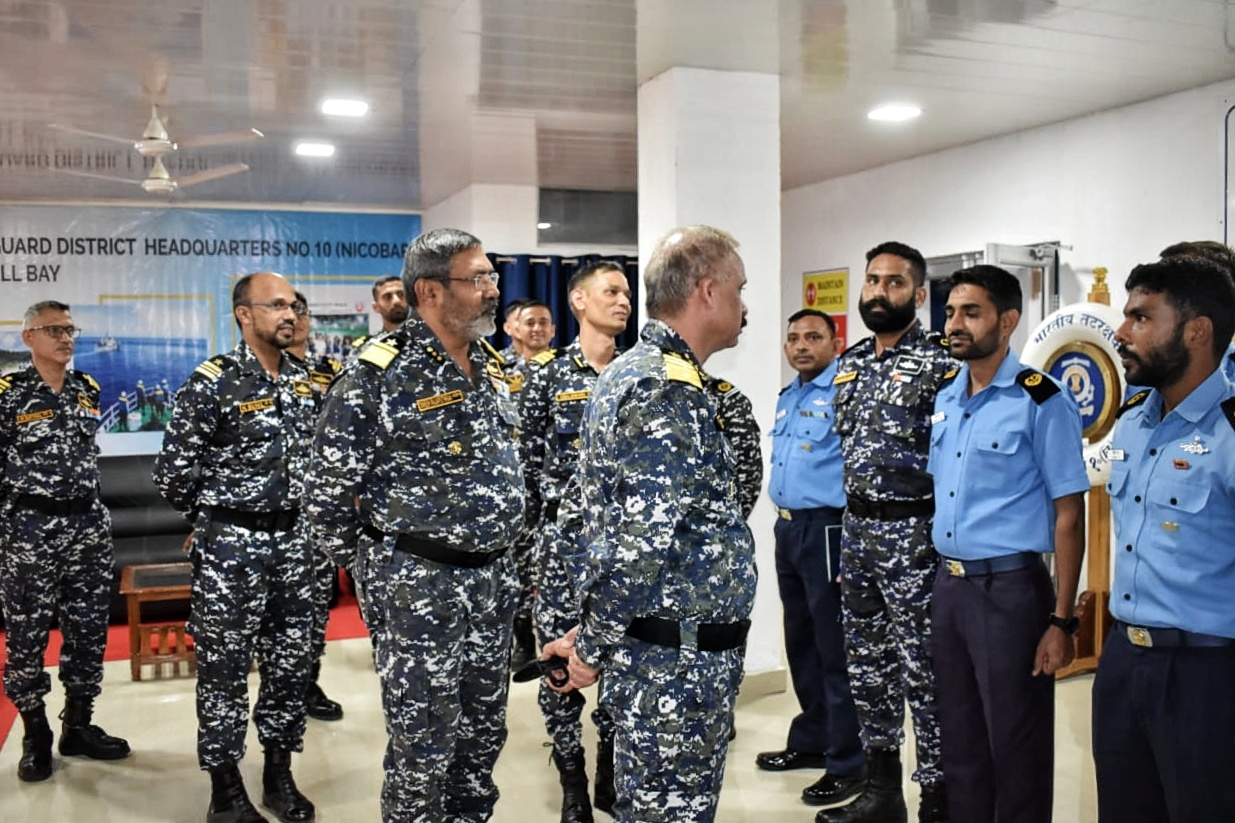
Indian Coast Guard personnel with NWU Type-1 camo replacing the "Blue working uniform" as worn by a personnel in right

=== Officer rank structure ===
A table showing the rank structure of Coast Guard officers with those of the other Indian armed services.

Indian Coast Guard Ranks	Indian Army Ranks	Indian Navy Ranks	Indian Air Force Ranks	Central Armed Police Forces Ranks	Police
Director-General /Additional Director-General	Lieutenant General	Vice Admiral	Air Marshal	Director General	Director General of Police
Inspector-General	Major General	Rear Admiral	Air Vice Marshal	Inspector General	Inspector General of Police
Deputy Inspector-General	Brigadier	Commodore	Air Commodore	Deputy Inspector General	Deputy Inspector General of Police
Commandant (Level 13-Pay Scale)	Colonel	Captain	Group Captain	Senior Commandant/Commandant	Superintendent (Selection Grade)
Commandant (Junior Grade)	Lt Colonel	Commander	Wing Commander	Second In Command/ Commandant	Superintendent
Deputy Commandant	Major	Lt Commander	Squadron Leader	Deputy Commandant	Additional Superintendent
Assistant Commandant (2 Years)	Captain	Lieutenant	Flight Lieutenant	Assistant Commandant	Deputy Superintendent
Assistant Commandant	Lieutenant	Sub Lieutenant	Flying Officer	Assistant Commandant (Junior )	Assistant Superintendent

=== Coast Guard officers ===
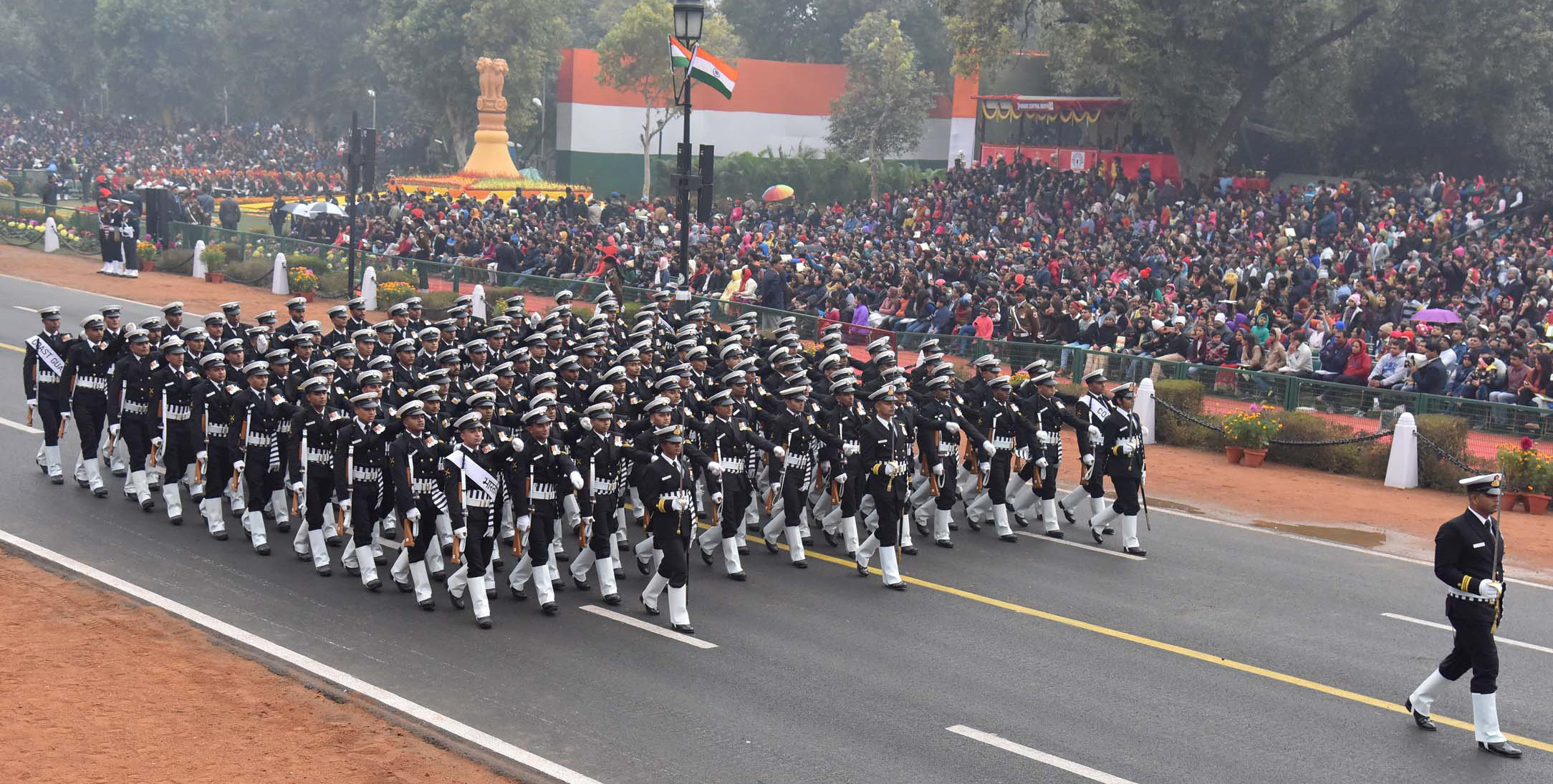
The Coast Guard Marching Contingent passes through the Rajpath, on the occasion of the 68th Republic Day Parade 2017

The naming of ranks of officers in the Coast Guard is as same as the rank of Central Armed Police Forces. Officers are appointed in the Coast Guard in one of four branches, as either a General-Duty officer, Pilot officer, Technical officer, or Law officer. Lady Officers have two branches, i.e., General-Duty Officer or Pilot Officer, and serve on shore establishments/Air Stations/Headquarters. They are not deployed on board Indian Coast Guard ships.

Officers of the Indian Coast Guard undergo Basic Military Training at the Indian Naval Academy, Ezhimala, along with their counterparts of the Indian Navy. This helps in the mutual interchange of Officers among these two sister services. While the Indian Coast Guard Academy is under construction in Mangaluru, Dakshina Kannada district, Karnataka.

General-Duty Officers

The command of ships at sea can only be exercised by officers of the General Duty (GD) branch. The key functions of a General-Duty Officer would be to operate weapons, sensors, and different kinds of equipment on board a ship. The safety of the ship and the men would be the GD officers' responsibility. All the District Commanders (COMDIS) and Commander of Coast Guard Region (COMCG) appointments are exercised by a GD Officer of the Indian Coast Guard.

Pilot Officers

Pilot Officers are also part of the GD branch. A Pilot Officer gets an opportunity to work at shore Air Stations along the Indian coasts and also on board ships. ICG operates fixed-wing aircraft for surveillance of the Exclusive Economic Zone. Helicopters are embarked on Coast Guard Offshore Patrol Vessels (OPV) to provide local surveillance and perform search and rescue mission at sea.

Technical Officers

Technical Officers are responsible for the operation of advanced technology and sensor systems on board Coast Guard vessels and aircraft, as well as on shore installations. They also command the maintenance wings of the force.

Law Officers

Law Officers act as legal advisers to their respective commanders. They represent the Indian Coast Guard in legal actions filed by or against the organisation. They also perform the duties of trial law officers in Coast Guard courts, convened to try delinquent Coast Guard personnel. The Directorate of Law at Coast Guard Headquarters is headed by a Deputy Inspector-General and is designated as the Chief Law Officer. Section 115 of the Coast Guard Act, 1978, deals with the qualifications necessary to be appointed as the Chief Law Officer of the Indian Coast Guard. Section 116 of the Coast Guard Act, 1978, defines the functions of the Chief Law Officer.

=== Enrolled personnel ===
Enrolled personnel in the Coast Guard serve as either a yantrik (technician) or navik (sailor).

- Yantriks responsible for operating and maintaining mechanical, electrical, or aeronautical equipment and systems on board the Coast Guard vessels and aircraft.
- Naviks may further serve in the General-Duty or Domestic branches.
  - The General-Duty naviks serves as sailors, weapons systems operators, communication specialists, divers, etc., or in specific maritime or aviation support roles.
  - The Domestic branch's navik serves in roles such as stewards, cooks, etc., on board Coast Guard vessels.

Enrolled personnel of the Indian Coast Guard are trained along with Indian Naval sailors at the naval training establishment INS Chilka. All training undertaken by Coast Guard personnel is the same as that undertaken by sailors in the Indian Navy. All personnel are trained in the operation of weapons systems in cases of emergency.

=== Rank insignia ===
Commissioned officer ranks

The rank insignia of commissioned officers.

Rank group	General/flag officers				Senior officers				Junior officers
Indian Coast Guard
Indian Coast Guard	Director general	Additional director general	Inspector general	Deputy inspector general (3-year seniority)	Deputy inspector general	Commandant	Commandant (Junior Grade)	Deputy commandant	Assistant commandant	Assistant commandant (under probation)	Assistant commandant (after phase II)

Other ranks

The rank insignia of non-commissioned officers and enlisted personnel.

Rank group	Subordinate Officers (SO)			Non commissioned officers (NCO)		Enlisted
Indian Coast Guard						No insignia
Indian Coast Guard	Pradhan Adhikari; Pradhan Sahayak Engineer	Uttam Adhikari; Uttam Sahayak Engineer	Adhikari; Sahayak Engineer	Pradhan Navik; Pradhan Yantrik	Uttam Navik; Uttam Yantrik	Navik; Yantrik

== Equipment ==
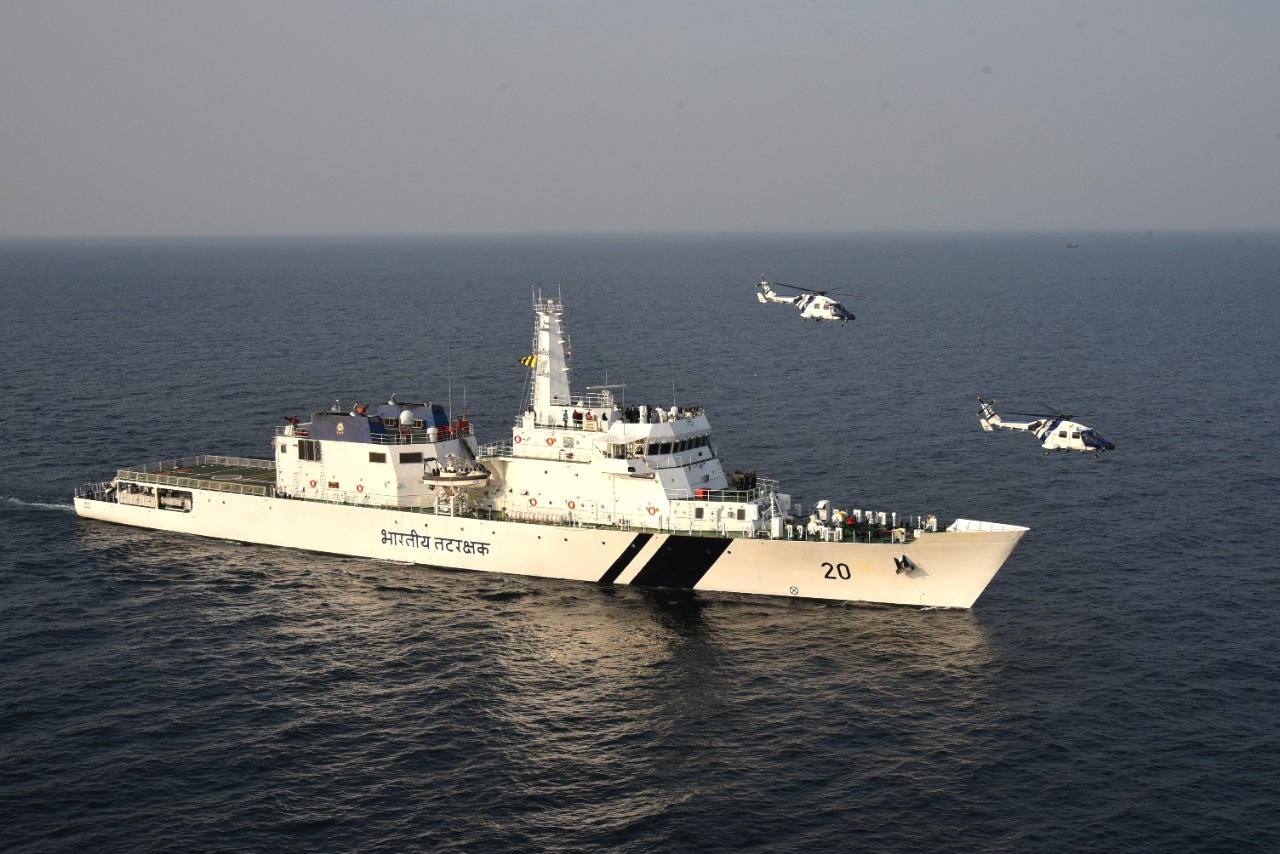
Dhruv MK.3 helicopters flying alongside ICGS Sajag.

In November 2024, the Indian Coast Guard had a strength of 182 ships and 78 aircraft. It plans to have 200 ships and 100 aircraft by 2030. At any given time, 55 to 60 surface platforms and 10 to 12 aircraft are deployed on patrol daily.

== Future of the Indian Coast Guard ==
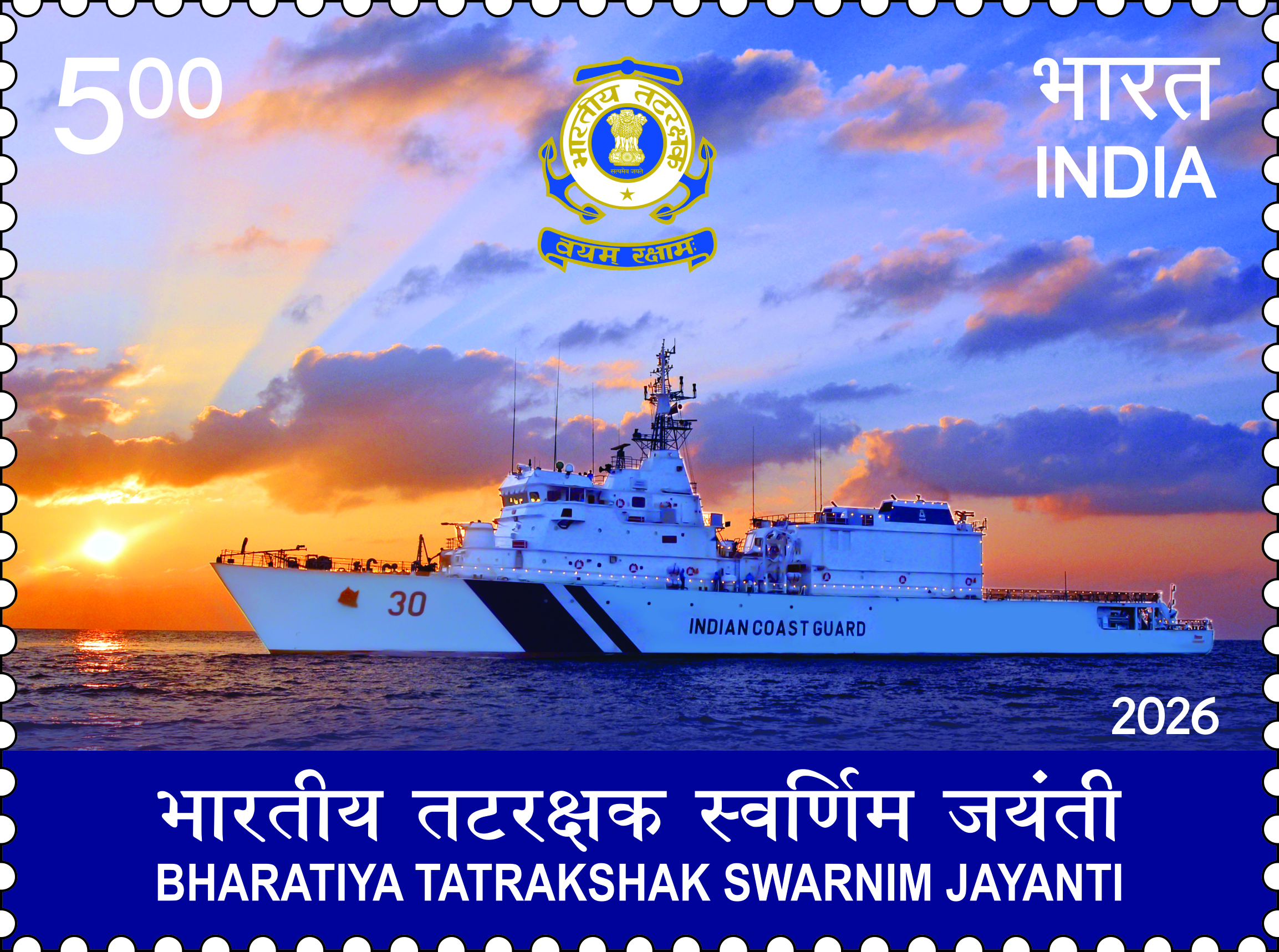
Bharatiya Tatrakshak Swarnim Stamp

The Indian Coast Guard expects to become a leading player in maritime security around the Indian Ocean. With a target set to triple its surface fleet strength by the turn of this decade, ICG has placed orders for 131 surveillance platforms that are already under construction in Indian shipyards and is in the process of signing contracts for building another 200 platforms. Contracts have been signed for state-of-the-art air cushion vehicles and advanced communication systems

The Indian Coast Guard was allotted ₹9,676.7 crore (US$1.0 billion) under the Capital and Revenue Head of the Union Budget 2025, which is a 26.5% increase over previous years. The funds will be used for the acquisition of more ALH, Dornier Do 228, fast patrol vessels (FPVs), training ships, and interceptor boats to augment current capacity.

== See also ==
- Coastal India
- Exclusive economic zone of India
- List of Indian Coast Guard directors general
- Indian Navy
- Indian Naval Academy
- Indian Coast Guard Academy
- Indian Army
- Indian Air Force
- Military of India
- Paramilitary forces of India
- Central Armed Police Forces
- Sagar Prahari Bal
