= Demographics of India =

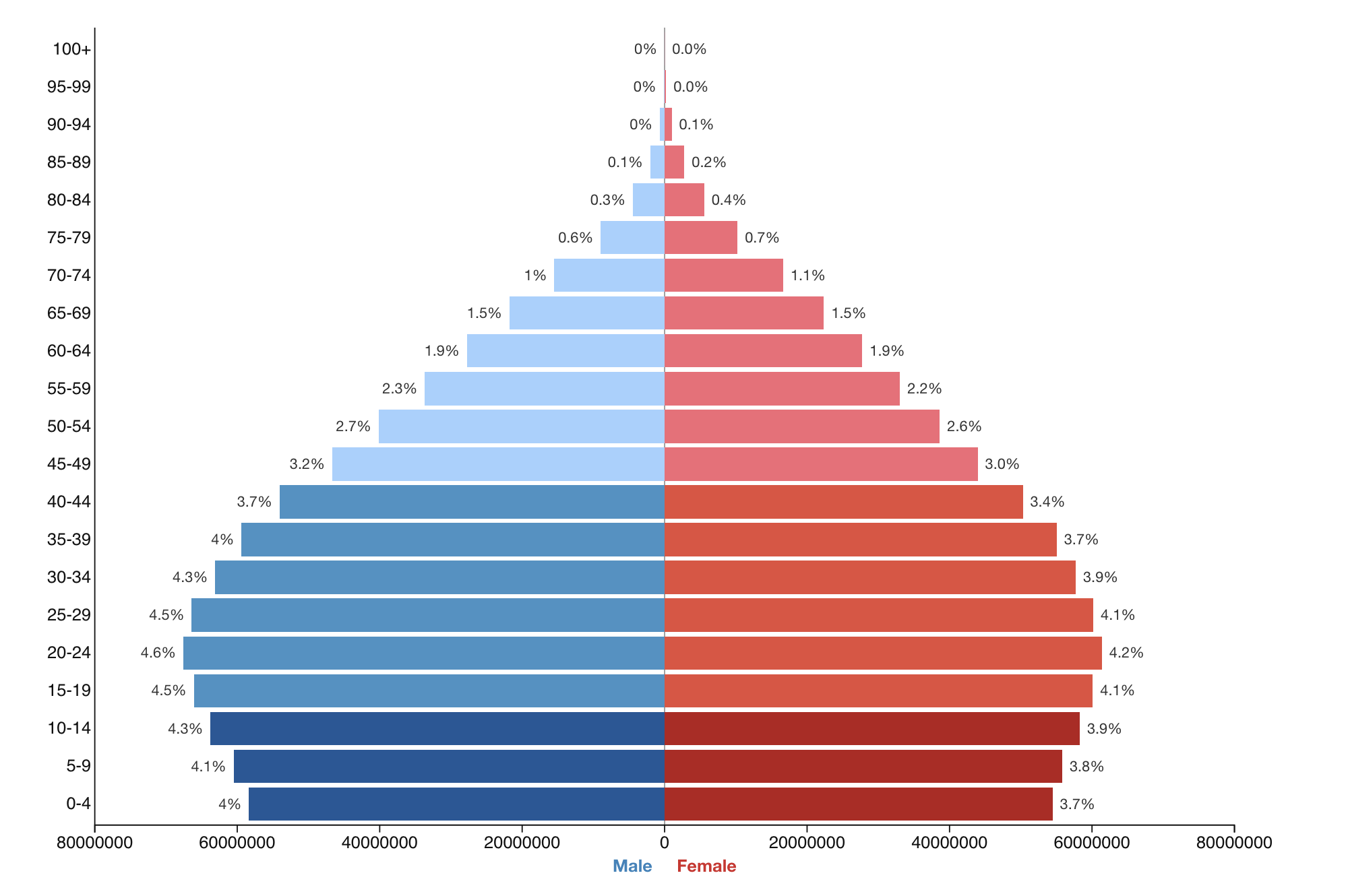
- Population pyramid of India in 2026
- Population: 1,414,203,889 (2021) 1,476,625,576 (2026)
- Density: 483.68 people/km^{2} (2023 est.)
- Growth rate: 0.89% (2023 est.)
- Birth rate: 15.6 births/1,000 population (2026 est.)
- Death rate: 6.7 deaths/1,000 population (2026 est.)
- Life expectancy: ▲72.03 years (2023 est.)
  - male: 70.52 years (2023 est.)
  - female: 73.60 years (2023 est.)
- Fertility rate: ▼1.93 children born/woman (2026)
- Infant mortality: ▼22.6 deaths/1,000 live births (2023)
- Net migration rate: -0.68 (negative net migration)
- Immigrant share: 0.3% (2024)

Age structure
- 0–14 years: 25.68% (male 183,695,000/female 166,295,000) (2021 est.)
- 15–64 years: 67.49% (male 472,653,000/female 447,337,000) (2021 est.)
- 65 and over: 6.83% (male 44,275,000/female 48,751,000) (2021 est.)

Sex ratio
- Total: 1.06 male(s)/female (2023)
- At birth: 1.1 male(s)/female (2023)
- Under 15: 1.11 male(s)/female (2023)
- 15–64 years: 1.07 male(s)/female (2023 est.)
- 65 and over: 0.85 male(s)/female (2023)

Nationality
- Nationality: Indian
- Major ethnic: Major Ethnic Groups (Indo-Aryan & Dravidian); Indo-European (70.16%); Indo-Aryan (70.12%); ▲ Hindustani (38.37%); Bengali (7.91%); ▼ Bengali Hindus (6.15%); ▲ Bengali Muslims (1.58%); Other Bengalis (0.18%); ▼ Marathi (6.92%); Gujarati (6.44%); ▼ Punjabi (4.49%); Kashmiris (0.26%); ▲ Bihari (2.35%); ▲ Assamese (1.03%); Other Indo-Aryans (2.35%); ▼ Iranian (0.04%); ▼ Dravidian (24.96%); Telugu (7.97%); ▼ Tamil (6.47%); Kannadiga (5.46%); ▼ Malayali (3.08%); ▲ Gondi (1.03%)
- Minor ethnic: Minor Ethnic Groups; ▲ Austro-Asiatic (1.48%); Munda & Santali (0.77%); ▲ Khasi (0.26%); Tibeto-Burman (0.74%); Bodo (0.44%); Naga (0.21%); Semitic (0.56%); Arab-Indians (0.56%); ▲ Others (1.52%); Anglo-Indians, Siddi, Jews, etc.

Language
- Official: See Languages of India
- Spoken: Hindi 43.6%; Bengali 8%; Marathi 6.9%; Telugu 6.8%; Tamil 6.7%; Gujarati 4.6%; Urdu 4.2%; Kannada 3.6%; Odia 3.1%; Malayalam 2.9%; Punjabi 2.7%; Assamese 1.3%; Maithili 1.1%; other 5.6%; (2011)

India is the most populous country in the world, comprising approximately one-sixth of the world population. According to the United Nations' World Population Dashboard, India's population reached slightly over 1.414 billion on 1 July 2021, surpassing that of China.

India remains a relatively young country, though it is undergoing a gradual demographic transition. As of 2024, the median age was approximately 29.8 years, compared to 40.2 in China. The United Nations Population Fund (UNFPA) estimates that 68% of the population is between 15 and 64 years old, creating a potential "demographic dividend" where a large working-age population can drive economic growth. However, the number of children is declining; the under-5 population peaked in 2007 and the under-15 cohort peaked in 2011.

Between 1975 and 2010, the population doubled to 1.2 billion. While the population continues to grow, the rate has slowed significantly from 2.3% annually (1972–1983) to roughly 0.89% in 2023. Current projections suggest the population will reach 1.7 billion by 2050.

India is highly diverse, hosting thousands of ethnic groups and four major language families: Indo-European, Dravidian, Austroasiatic, and Tibeto-Burman. The country also includes linguistic isolates such as Nihali and Burushaski, and distinct minority communities including Anglo-Indians and Siddi.

The human sex ratio has shown an upward trend after decades of decline, reaching 943 females per 1,000 males in 2011 and estimated at 1,060 males per 1,000 females (approx. 944 females/1000 males) in 2023.

== History ==
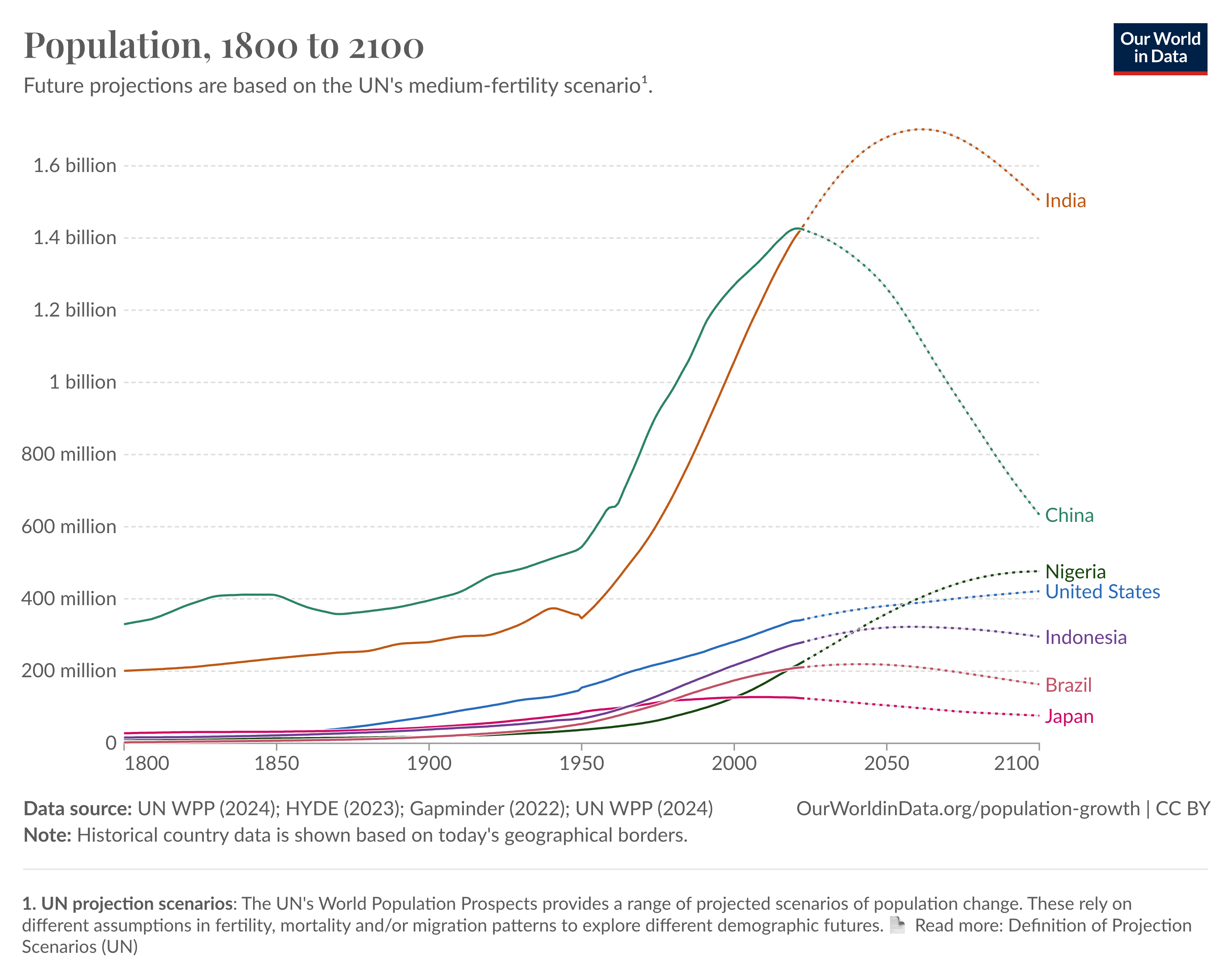
The historical population of India, China, and selected other countries since 1800 with future projections to 2100, based on 2024 UN's medium-fertility scenario

=== Prehistory to early 19th century ===
The following table lists estimates for the population of India, including what are now Pakistan and Bangladesh, from prehistory up until 1820. It includes estimates and growth rates according to five economic historians, along with interpolated estimates and overall aggregate averages derived from their estimates.

Year	Maddison (2001)		Clark (1967)		Biraben (1979)		Durand (1974)		McEvedy (1978)			
Year	Population	% growth / century	Population	% growth / century	Population	% growth / century	Population	% growth / century	Population	% growth / century	Period	% growth / century
10,000 BC	—N/a	—N/a	—N/a	—N/a	—N/a	—N/a	—N/a	—N/a	100,000	—N/a	Stone Age	3.9
4000 BC	—N/a	—N/a	—N/a	—N/a	—N/a	—N/a	—N/a	—N/a	1,000,000	3.9	Stone Age	3.9
2000 BC	—N/a	—N/a	—N/a	—N/a	—N/a	—N/a	—N/a	—N/a	6,000,000	9.4	Bronze Age	9.4
500 BC	—N/a	—N/a	—N/a	—N/a	—N/a	—N/a	—N/a	—N/a	25,000,000	10	Iron Age	10.2
400 BC	—N/a	—N/a	—N/a	—N/a	30,000,000	—N/a	—N/a	—N/a	26,600,000	6.3	Iron Age	10.2
200 BC	—N/a	—N/a	—N/a	—N/a	55,000,000	35.4	—N/a	—N/a	30,000,000	6.3	Maurya era	22.5
1 AD	75,000,000	—N/a	70,000,000	—N/a	46,000,000	–9.3	75,000,000	—N/a	34,000,000	6.5	Classical era	5.3
200	75,000,000	0	72,500,000	1.7	45,000,000	–1.1	75,000,000	0	39,000,000	7.1	Classical era	5.3
400	75,000,000	0	75,000,000	1.7	32,000,000	–18.6	75,000,000	0	45,000,000	7.4	Classical era	5.3
500	75,000,000	0	75,000,000	0	33,000,000	3.1	75,000,000	0	48,000,000	6.5	Classical era	5.3
600	75,000,000	0	75,000,000	0	37,000,000	12.1	75,000,000	0	51,000,000	6.5	Early medieval era	1.9
700	75,000,000	0	75,000,000	0	50,000,000	35.1	75,000,000	0	56,500,000	10.3	Early medieval era	1.9
800	75,000,000	0	75,000,000	0	43,000,000	–16.3	75,000,000	0	62,000,000	10.3	Early medieval era	1.9
900	75,000,000	0	72,500,000	–3.5	38,000,000	–13.2	75,000,000	0	69,500,000	11.4	Early medieval era	1.9
1000	75,000,000	0	70,000,000	–3.5	40,000,000	5.3	75,000,000	0	77,000,000	11.4	Early medieval era	1.9
1100	81,000,000	8	72,500,000	3.5	51,000,000	27.5	81,300,000	8.4	80,000,000	3.9	Late medieval era	8.1
1200	87,500,000	8	75,000,000	3.5	65,100,000	27.5	88,200,000	8.4	83,000,000	3.8	Late medieval era	8.1
1300	94,500,000	8	75,000,000	0	83,000,000	27.5	95,700,000	8.4	88,000,000	6	Late medieval era	8.1
1400	102,000,000	8	77,000,000	3.3	88,800,000	7	103,700,000	8.4	94,000,000	6.8	Late medieval era	8.1
1500	110,000,000	8	79,000,000	3.3	95,000,000	7	112,500,000	8.4	100,000,000	6.4	Late medieval era	8.1
1600	135,000,000	22.8	100,000,000	26.6	145,000,000	52.6	135,800,000	20.7	130,000,000	30	Mughal era	31.9
1650	150,000,000	22.2	150,000,000	125	160,000,000	20.7	149,100,000	20.7	145,000,000	24.4	Mughal era	31.9
1700	165,000,000	22.2	200,000,000	77.8	175,000,000	20.7	163,900,000	20.7	160,000,000	21.8	Mughal era	31.9
1750	182,100,000	21.8	200,000,000	0	182,700,000	9	180,000,000	20.7	170,000,000	12.9	Colonial era	12.2
1800	200,900,000	21.8	190,000,000	–10.8	190,700,000	9	—N/a	—N/a	185,000,000	18.4	Colonial era	12.2
1820	209,000,000	21.8	190,000,000	0	194,000,000	9	—N/a	—N/a	200,000,000	47.7	Colonial era	12.2

=== Population of India over time ===
India's population has changed significantly due to migrations, technological advancements, and societal developments. Below is a table of historical population estimates:

Historical Population of India (10,000 BC – 2021)
Era	Year	Estimated Population	Growth Rate (%)
Classical India	100 AD	52,748,932	+2.8%
Classical India	200 AD	54,902,817	+4.1%
Classical India	300 AD	57,654,213	+5.0%
Classical India	400 AD	60,834,921	+5.5%
Classical India	500 AD	64,291,488	+5.7%
Early Medieval India	600 AD	68,102,304	+5.9%
Early Medieval India	700 AD	71,837,610	+5.5%
Early Medieval India	800 AD	75,983,210	+5.8%
Early Medieval India	900 AD	81,274,936	+7.0%
Early Medieval India	1000 AD	86,732,843	+6.7%
Delhi Sultanate	1100 AD	91,403,287	+5.4%
Delhi Sultanate	1200 AD	96,289,634	+5.4%
Delhi Sultanate	1300 AD	101,984,726	+5.9%
Delhi Sultanate	1400 AD	111,209,832	+9.1%
Mughal Empire	1500 AD	121,847,294	+9.6%
Mughal Empire	1600 AD	136,204,781	+11.8%
Mughal Empire	1700 AD	161,874,263	+18.9%
Mughal Empire	1800 AD	186,432,976	+15.2%
Colonial Period	1810	190,000,000	+2.1%
Colonial Period	1820	195,000,000	+2.6%
Colonial Period	1830	200,000,000	+2.6%
Colonial Period	1840	205,000,000	+2.5%
Colonial Period	1850	210,000,000	+2.4%
British Raj	1860	215,000,000	+2.4%
British Raj	1870	220,000,000	+2.3%
British Raj	1881	253,891,821	+15.4%
British Raj	1891	287,223,431	+13.1%
British Raj	1901	317,318,032	+10.5%
British Raj	1911	317,369,222	+0.02%
British Raj	1921	318,866,673	+0.46%
British Raj	1931	337,515,000	+5.8%
British Raj	1941	389,000,000	+15.3%
Post-independence India	1951	361,088,000	-7.18%
Post-independence India	1961	439,235,000	+21.7%
Post-independence India	1971	548,159,652	+24.8%
Post-independence India	1981	683,329,097	+24.7%
Post-independence India	1991	846,387,888	+24.0%
Post-independence India	2001	1,028,610,328	+21.5%
Post-independence India	2011	1,210,854,977	+17.9%
Post-independence India	2021	1,414,203,889	+17.9%

The population grew from the South Asian Stone Age in 10,000 BC to the Maurya Empire in 200 BC at a steadily increasing growth rate, before population growth slowed down in the classical era up to 500 AD, and then became largely stagnant during the early medieval era up to 1000 AD. The population growth rate then increased in the late medieval era (during the Delhi Sultanate) from 1000 to 1500.

Under the Mughal Empire, India experienced a demographic upsurge, 15% of the population lived in urban centres, higher than the percentage of the population in 19th-century British India and contemporary Europe up until the 19th century. These estimates by Abraham Eraly and Paolo Malanima have been criticised by Tim Dyson, who considers them exaggerations and estimates urbanisation of the Mughal Empire to be less than 9% of the population.

Under the reign of Akbar (reigned 1556–1605) in 1600, the Mughal Empire's urban population was up to 17 million people, larger than the urban population in Europe. By 1700, Mughal India had an urban population of 23 million people, larger than British India's urban population of 22.3 million in 1871. Nizamuddin Ahmad (1551–1621) reported that, under Akbar's reign, Mughal India had 120 large cities and 3,200 townships. A number of cities in India had a population between a quarter-million and half-million people, with larger cities including Agra (in Agra Subah) with up to 800,000 people and Dhaka (in Bengal Subah) with over 1 million people. Mughal India also had a large number of villages, with 455,698 villages by the time of Aurangzeb (reigned 1658–1707).

=== Late 19th century to early 20th century ===
The total fertility rate is the number of children born per woman. It is based on fairly good data for the entire years. Sources: Our World in Data and Gapminder Foundation.

Years	1880	1881	1882	1883	1884	1885	1886	1887	1888	1889	1890	1902
Total Fertility Rate in India	5.95	5.92	5.89	5.86	5.82	5.79	4.38	5.76	5.76	5.75	5.75	5.75

Years	1921	1922	1923	1924	1925	1926	1927	1928	1929	1930
Total Fertility Rate in India	5.761	5.77	5.78	5.79	5.8	5.81	5.82	5.83	5.85	5.86

Life expectancy from 1881 to 1950

Years	1881	1891	1901	1905	1911	1915	1921	1925	1931	1935	1941	1950
Life expectancy in India	25.4	24.3	23.5	24.0	23.2	24.0	24.9	27.6	29.3	31.0	32.6	35.4

The population of India under the British Raj (including what are now Pakistan and Bangladesh) according to censuses:

Census year	Population	Growth (%)
1871	238,830,958	—N/a
1881	253,896,330	6.3
1891	287,223,431	13.1
1901	293,550,310	2.2
1911	315,156,396	7.4
1921	318,942,480	1.2
1931	352,837,778	10.6
1941	388,997,955	10.2

Studies of India's population since 1881 have focused on such topics as total population, birth and death rates, geographic distribution, literacy, the rural and urban divide, cities of a million, and the three cities with populations over eight million: Delhi, Greater Mumbai (Bombay), and Kolkata (Calcutta).

Mortality rates fell in the period 1920–45, primarily due to biological immunisation. Suggestions that it was the benefits of colonialism are refuted by academic thinking: "There can be no serious, informed belief... that... late colonial era mortality diminished and population grew rapidly because of improvements in income, living standards, nutrition, environmental standards, sanitation or health policies, nor was there a cultural transformation...".

== Languages ==
Mother tongue languages of India (2011)
1. Hindi (26.6%)
2. Bengali (7.94%)
3. Marathi (6.84%)
4. Telugu (6.68%)
5. Tamil (5.69%)
6. Gujarati (4.55%)
7. Urdu (4.19%)
8. Bhojpuri (4.18%)
9. Kannada (3.59%)
10. Malayalam (2.87%)
11. Others (26.9%)

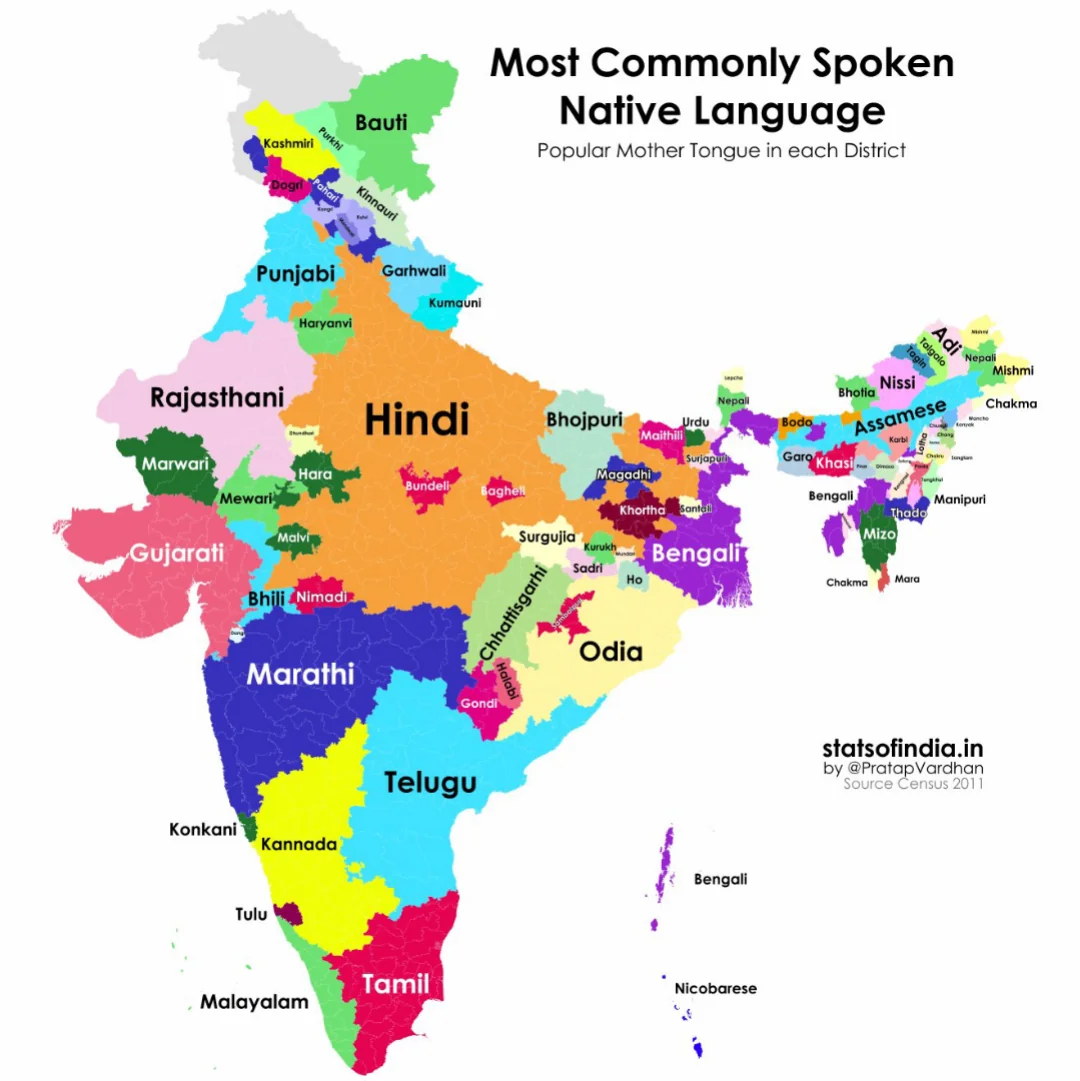
Most Commonly Spoken Native Language in India by District, 2011 Census

Top 30 Languages of India by number of native speakers from 1971 to 2011 (including ^{#}Non-scheduled languages)
Language	Language Family	Speakers (1971)	Speakers (1981)	Speakers (1991)	Speakers (2001)	Speakers (2011)
Hindi (Note: Includes Bihari languages, Bajri Rajasthani languages, Pahari, Awadhi language, Bagheli/Baghel Khan Language, Banjari Language. A total of 12 types.)	Indo-Aryan	202,767,971	257,749,009	329,505,193	422,048,642	528,347,193
Bengali	Indo-Aryan	44,792,312	51,298,319	69,595,738	83,369,769	97,237,669
Telugu	Dravidian	44,756,923	50,624,611	66,017,615	74,002,856	81,127,740
Marathi	Indo-Aryan	41,765,190	49,452,922	62,481,681	71,936,894	83,026,680
Tamil	Dravidian	37,690,106	–	53,006,368	60,793,814	69,026,881
Urdu	Indo-Aryan	28,620,895	34,941,435	43,406,932	51,536,111	50,772,631
Gujarati	Indo-Aryan	25,865,012	33,063,267	40,695,370	46,091,617	55,492,554
Kannada	Dravidian	21,710,649	25,697,146	32,753,676	37,924,011	43,706,512
Malayalam	Dravidian	21,938,760	25,700,705	30,377,176	33,066,392	34,838,819
Odia	Indo-Aryan	19,863,198	23,021,528	28,061,313	33,017,446	37,521,324
Punjabi	Indo-Aryan	14,108,443	19,611,199	23,378,744	29,102,477	33,124,726
Assamese	Indo-Aryan	8,959,558	–	13,079,696	13,168,484	15,311,351
Maithili	Indo-Aryan	6,130,026	7,522,265	7,766,921	12,179,122	13,583,464
Bhili/Bhilodi^{#}	Indo-Aryan	3,399,285	4,293,314	5,572,308	9,582,957	10,413,637
Santali	Austro-Asiatic	3,786,899	4,332,511	5,216,325	6,469,600	7,368,192
Kashmiri	Indo-Aryan	2,495,487	3,176,975	–	5,527,698	6,797,587
Nepali	Indo-Aryan	1,419,835	1,360,639	2,076,645	2,871,749	2,926,168
Gondi^{#}	Dravidian	1,688,284	1,913,262	2,124,852	2,713,790	2,984,453
Sindhi	Indo-Aryan	1,676,875	2,044,389	2,122,848	2,535,485	2,772,264
Konkani	Indo-Aryan	1,508,432	1,570,108	1,760,607	2,489,015	2,256,502
Dogri	Indo-Aryan	1,299,143	1,530,616	–	2,282,589	2,596,767
Khandeshi^{#}	Indo-Aryan	251,896	1,216,789	973,709	2,075,258	1,860,236
Kurukh^{#}	Dravidian	1,235,665	1,333,670	1,426,618	1,751,489	1,988,350
Tulu^{#}	Dravidian	1,158,419	1,417,224	1,552,259	1,722,768	1,846,427
Meiteilon (Manipuri)	Sino-Tibetan	791,714	901,407	1,270,216	1,466,705	1,761,079
Bodo	Sino-Tibetan	556,576	–	1,221,881	1,350,478	1,482,929
Khasi^{#}	Austro-Asiatic	479,028	628,846	912,283	1,128,575	1,431,344
Mundari^{#}	Austro-Asiatic	771,253	742,739	861,378	1,061,352	1,128,228
Ho^{#}	Austro-Asiatic	751,389	783,301	949,216	1,042,724	1,421,418
Tripuri^{#}	Sino-Tibetan	372,579	502,067	694,940	854,023	1,011,294

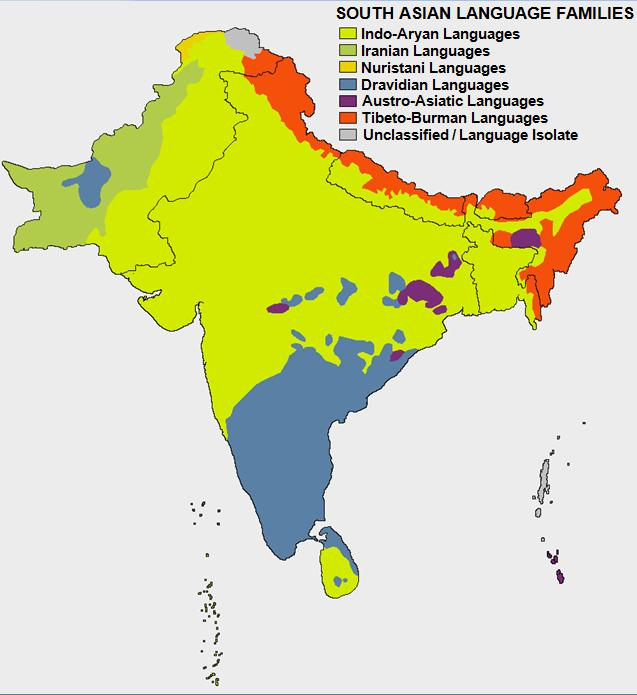
Map of South Asian language families

According to the 2001 census, 41.03% of the Indians spoke Hindi natively, while the rest spoke Assamese, Bengali, Gujarati, Maithili, Kannada, Malayalam, Marathi, Odia, Punjabi, Tamil, Telugu, Urdu and a variety of other languages. There are a total of 122 languages and 234 mother tongues spoken in India. Of these, 22 languages are specified in the Eighth Schedule of Indian Constitution, while 100 are non-specified.

The table below excludes Mao-Maram, Paomata and Purul subdivisions of Senapati District of Manipur state due to cancellation of census results.

== Vital statistics ==
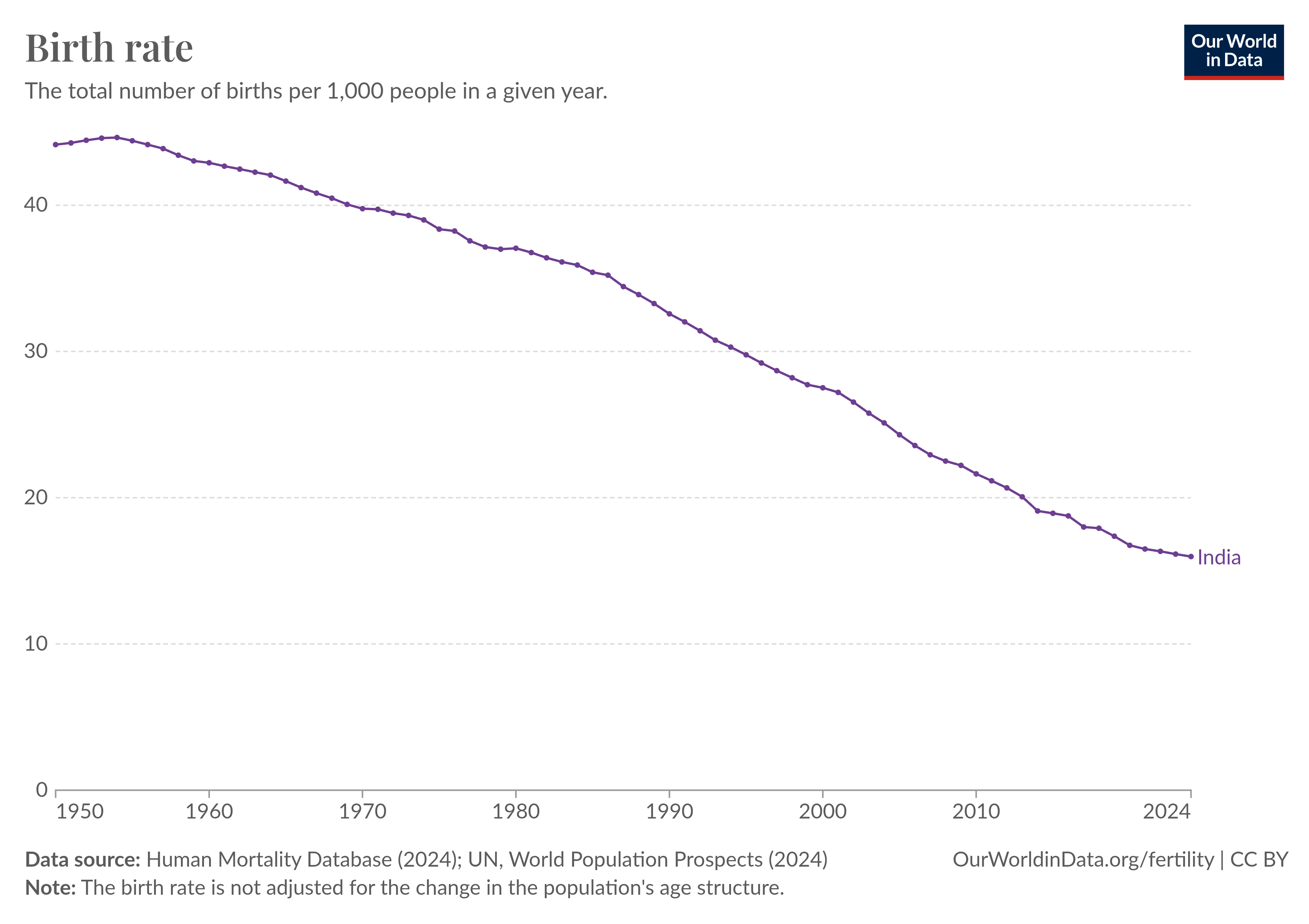
Crude birth rate trends in India (per 1000 people, national average)

=== UN estimates ===
United Nations, World Population Prospects: The 2024 revision – India
Year	Mid-year population	Births per year	Deaths per year	Annual change in population	Crude birth rate (per 1000)	Crude death rate (per 1000)	Natural change (per 1000)	Crude migration rate (per 1000)	Total Fertility rate	Infant mortality (per 1000)	Life expectancy
1950	346,278,817	15,287,998	7,852,219	7,435,779	44.15	22.68	21.6		5.73	181.2	41.7
1951	353,870,058	15,663,440	7,973,004	7,591,241	44.26	22.53	21.6	0.5	5.77	180.1	41.7
1952	361,874,904	16,082,888	8,048,990	8,004,846	44.44	22.24	21.9	0.2	5.82	177.5	42.0
1953	370,104,571	16,501,176	8,169,722	8,229,667	44.59	22.07	22.1	0	5.87	175.3	42.2
1954	378,687,141	16,903,336	8,122,090	8,582,570	44.64	21.45	22.7	−0.4	5.91	172.2	43.0
1955	387,700,891	17,219,756	8,168,768	9,013,750	44.41	21.07	22.8	−0.1	5.91	169.7	43.4
1956	396,988,906	17,526,402	8,232,471	9,288,015	44.15	20.74	22.8	0	5.91	167.3	43.8
1957	406,253,895	17,825,650	8,323,747	9,264,989	43.88	20.49	22.8	0	5.91	165.0	44.1
1958	415,777,437	18,053,426	8,374,383	9,523,542	43.42	20.14	22.7	−0.2	5.90	162.7	44.4
1959	425,780,669	18,321,022	8,395,630	10,003,232	43.03	19.72	22.7	−0.2	5.89	160.3	44.9
1960	435,990,344	18,705,012	8,467,290	10,209,675	42.90	19.42	22.9	0.2	5.92	158.2	45.2
1961	446,564,730	19,054,934	8,586,012	10,574,386	42.67	19.23	22.8	0.5	5.94	156.4	45.4
1962	457,283,092	19,422,986	8,679,851	10,718,362	42.48	18.98	22.9	0.5	5.95	154.5	45.7
1963	468,138,576	19,783,962	8,767,246	10,855,484	42.26	18.73	22.9	0.5	5.97	152.7	45.9
1964	479,229,599	20,156,988	8,871,377	11,091,023	42.06	18.51	23.0	0.3	5.98	151.1	46.2
1965	490,140,141	20,414,206	9,488,516	10,910,542	41.65	19.36	21.7	0.9	5.94	156.4	45.0
1966	500,740,250	20,632,990	9,543,207	10,600,109	41.20	19.06	21.6	0.2	5.88	154.7	45.3
1967	511,606,375	20,889,458	9,609,691	10,866,125	40.83	18.78	21.5	0	5.83	153.1	45.7
1968	522,716,894	21,162,298	9,155,303	11,110,519	40.48	17.52	22.4	−0.5	5.76	145.0	47.5
1969	533,880,544	21,386,208	9,218,624	11,163,650	40.06	17.27	22.3	0	5.68	143.3	47.9
1970	545,864,268	21,705,420	9,287,483	11,983,724	39.76	17.01	22.3	−0.1	5.62	141.7	48.2
1971	558,096,383	22,169,874	9,382,778	12,232,115	39.72	16.81	22.5	−0.1	5.57	139.9	48.6
1972	570,482,142	22,509,830	9,468,026	12,385,759	39.46	16.60	22.5	0	5.48	138.5	49.0
1973	583,465,595	22,929,810	9,517,150	12,983,453	39.30	16.31	22.7	0.1	5.40	136.3	49.5
1974	597,041,392	23,284,796	9,489,001	13,575,797	39.00	15.89	22.8	0	5.33	133.3	50.2
1975	611,309,532	23,451,070	9,492,655	14,268,140	38.36	15.53	22.6	0	5.20	130.7	50.8
1976	625,861,887	23,935,742	9,499,656	14,552,355	38.24	15.18	22.7	−0.4	5.13	127.9	51.4
1977	640,801,105	24,070,484	9,494,741	14,939,218	37.56	14.82	22.2	0.1	5.01	124.9	51.9
1978	655,728,226	24,359,834	9,461,503	14,927,121	37.15	14.43	22.1	0.3	4.89	121.7	52.5
1979	671,155,745	24,833,594	9,440,528	15,427,519	37.00	14.07	22.3	0.2	4.81	118.4	53.1
1980	687,354,031	25,471,068	9,452,567	16,198,286	37.06	13.75	22.5	0.4	4.78	115.2	53.6
1981	703,696,255	25,868,440	9,446,658	16,342,224	36.76	13.42	22.7	0.3	4.70	112.1	54.2
1982	720,313,474	26,221,360	9,431,256	16,617,219	36.40	13.09	22.6	0.3	4.62	109.3	54.7
1983	737,372,685	26,637,448	9,418,131	17,059,211	36.13	12.77	22.6	0.2	4.57	106.7	55.3
1984	754,875,451	27,113,114	9,414,277	17,502,766	35.92	12.47	22.7	0.2	4.52	104.2	55.8
1985	772,647,801	27,366,950	9,398,793	17,772,350	35.42	12.16	22.5	0.2	4.43	101.8	56.3
1986	790,689,978	27,848,424	9,392,670	18,042,177	35.22	11.88	22.7	−0.1	4.40	99.4	56.8
1987	808,931,261	27,860,878	9,365,358	18,241,283	34.44	11.58	22.2	0.2	4.31	97.0	57.3
1988	827,342,997	28,040,342	9,337,583	18,411,736	33.89	11.29	21.9	0.2	4.22	94.6	57.8
1989	846,039,530	28,154,986	9,306,083	18,696,533	33.28	11.00	21.6	0.3	4.13	92.2	58.2
1990	864,972,219	28,171,520	9,277,651	18,932,689	32.57	10.73	21.1	0.5	4.05	89.8	58.7
1991	883,927,607	28,305,720	9,256,425	18,955,388	32.02	10.47	21.0	0.2	3.96	87.6	59.1
1992	902,957,072	28,365,204	9,232,809	19,029,465	31.41	10.22	20.7	0.3	3.88	85.5	59.5
1993	922,118,380	28,374,418	9,221,708	19,161,308	30.77	10.00	20.3	0.4	3.80	83.5	59.8
1994	941,163,775	28,512,692	9,201,756	19,045,395	30.30	9.78	20.0	0.4	3.72	81.4	60.2
1995	960,301,048	28,588,052	9,191,892	19,137,273	29.77	9.57	19.7	0.4	3.65	79.3	60.6
1996	979,678,464	28,623,284	9,180,936	19,377,416	29.22	9.37	19.4	0.3	3.58	77.1	61.0
1997	999,133,765	28,659,994	9,166,224	19,455,301	28.68	9.17	19.0	0.4	3.51	74.8	61.4
1998	1,018,665,073	28,724,934	9,155,898	19,531,308	28.20	8.99	18.7	0.4	3.45	72.5	61.8
1999	1,038,225,821	28,790,310	9,141,493	19,560,748	27.73	8.80	18.4	0.3	3.38	70.2	62.2
2000	1,057,922,728	29,111,712	9,127,431	19,696,907	27.52	8.63	18.3	0.1	3.35	67.8	62.7
2001	1,077,898,572	29,324,930	9,143,228	19,975,844	27.21	8.48	18.2	0	3.30	65.4	63.1
2002	1,097,600,381	29,128,216	9,103,548	19,701,809	26.54	8.29	17.7	0.2	3.22	63.1	63.6
2003	1,116,802,997	28,794,442	9,074,469	19,202,616	25.78	8.13	17.2	0.2	3.12	60.8	64.1
2004	1,135,991,510	28,537,736	9,067,053	19,188,513	25.12	7.98	16.7	0.2	3.05	58.6	64.5
2005	1,154,676,319	28,063,000	9,027,961	18,684,809	24.30	7.82	16.1	0.1	2.96	56.3	65.0
2006	1,172,878,890	27,637,610	8,995,893	18,202,571	23.56	7.67	15.5	−0.1	2.86	54.1	65.4
2007	1,190,676,028	27,304,622	8,972,698	17,797,138	22.93	7.54	15.1	−0.3	2.78	51.9	65.8
2008	1,207,930,962	27,186,094	8,950,894	17,254,934	22.51	7.41	14.7	−0.4	2.72	49.6	66.1
2009	1,225,524,760	27,219,670	8,934,340	17,593,798	22.21	7.29	14.5	−0.5	2.67	47.4	66.5
2010	1,243,481,564	26,900,710	8,908,601	17,956,804	21.63	7.16	14.1	−0.2	2.60	45.2	66.9
2011	1,261,224,952	26,681,990	8,889,393	17,743,388	21.16	7.05	13.7	0	2.54	43.0	67.4
2012	1,278,674,506	26,432,416	8,879,964	17,449,554	20.67	6.95	13.3	0.1	2.47	40.8	67.9
2013	1,295,829,506	25,995,998	8,888,126	17,155,000	20.06	6.86	13.0	0.1	2.41	38.7	68.5
2014	1,312,277,184	25,050,538	8,884,412	16,447,678	19.09	6.77	12.3	0.2	2.31	36.7	69.1
2015	1,328,024,492	25,147,252	8,936,426	15,747,308	18.94	6.73	12.1	−0.2	2.29	34.7	69.6
2016	1,343,944,293	25,207,146	9,004,539	15,919,801	18.76	6.70	11.9	0	2.27	32.8	70.1
2017	1,359,657,392	24,466,744	9,072,749	15,713,099	18.00	6.67	11.3	0.3	2.20	31.1	70.5
2018	1,374,659,068	24,620,206	9,169,449	15,001,676	17.91	6.67	11.0	−0.1	2.18	29.4	70.7
2019	1,389,030,303	24,124,982	9,264,486	14,371,235	17.37	6.67	10.3	0	2.11	27.9	70.9
2020	1,402,617,692	23,485,340	10,118,286	13,587,389	16.74	7.21	9.2	0.4	2.05	26.6	70.1
2021	1,414,203,889	23,321,854	13,093,783	11,586,197	16.49	9.26	7.0	−1.0	2.01	25.5	67.2
2022	1,425,423,212	23,286,124	9,373,180	11,219,323	16.34	6.58	7.2	−0.4	1.99	23.9	67.7
2023	1,438,069,597	23,219,488	9,507,013	12,646,385	16.15	6.61	9.5	−1.4	1.98	22.6	72.0
2024	1,450,935,791	23,186,978	9,557,050	12,999,094	15.98	6.59	9.39	-0.43	1.96		
2025	1,463,865,525				15.8	6.6	9.1		1.94		
2026	1,476,625,576				15.6	6.7	8.9		1.93		

View source data.
View source data.
View source data.
View source data.
View source data.

==== Regional growth ====
Decadal growth rate by state and union territories (Census of India)
States and UTs	1901–11	1911–21	1921–31	1931–41	1941–51	1951–61	1961–71	1971–81	1981–91	1991–01	2001–11
India	+5.75	-0.31	+11.00	+14.22	+13.31	+21.51	+24.80	+24.66	+23.87	+21.54	+17.70
Jammu and Kashmir	+7.16	+5.75	+10.14	+10.36	+10.42	+9.44	+29.65	+29.69	+30.89	+29.43	+23.64
Himachal Pradesh	1.22	+1.65	+5.23	+11.54	+5.42	+17.87	+23.04	+23.71	+20.79	+17.54	+12.94
Punjab	-10.78	+6.26	+12.02	+19.82	-4.58	+21.56	+21.70	+23.89	+20.81	+20.10	+13.89
Chandigarh	-16.07	-1.65	+9.10	+14.11	+7.47	+394.13	+114.59	+75.55	+42.16	+40.28	+17.19
Uttarakhand	+8.20	-1.23	+8.74	+13.63	+12.67	+22.57	+24.42	+27.45	+23.13	+20.41	+18.81
Haryana	-9.70	+1.95	+7.14	+15.63	+7.60	+33.79	+32.22	+28.75	+27.41	+28.43	+19.90
Delhi	+1.98	+18.03	+30.26	+44.27	+90.00	+52.44	+52.93	+53.00	+51.45	+47.02	+21.21
Rajasthan	+6.70	-6.29	+14.14	+18.01	+15.20	+26.20	+27.83	+32.97	+28.44	+28.41	+21.31
Uttar Pradesh	-1.36	-3.16	+6.56	+13.57	+11.78	+16.38	+19.54	+25.39	+25.61	+25.85	+20.23
Bihar	+1.52	-0.97	+9.74	+12.22	+10.58	+19.79	+20.91	+24.16	+23.38	+28.62	+25.42
Sikkim	+48.98	-7.05	+34.37	+10.67	+13.34	+17.76	+29.38	+50.77	+28.47	+33.06	+12.89
Arunachal Pradesh	—N/a	—N/a	—N/a	—N/a	—N/a	—N/a	+38.91	+35.15	+36.83	+27.00	+26.03
Nagaland	+46.76	+6.55	+12.62	+6.04	+8.60	+14.07	+39.88	+50.05	+56.08	+64.53	-0.58
Manipur	+21.71	+10.92	+16.04	+14.92	+12.80	+35.04	+37.53	+32.46	+29.29	+24.86	+24.50
Mizoram	+10.64	+7.90	+26.42	+22.81	+28.42	+35.61	+24.93	+48.55	+39.70	+28.82	+23.48
Tripura	+32.48	+32.59	+25.63	+34.14	+24.56	+78.71	+36.28	+31.92	+34.30	+16.03	+14.84
Meghalaya	+15.71	+7.21	+13.83	+15.59	+8.97	+27.03	+31.50	+32.04	+32.86	+30.65	+27.95
Assam	+16.99	+20.48	+19.91	+20.40	+19.93	+34.98	+34.95	+23.36	+24.24	+18.92	+17.07
West Bengal	+6.25	-2.91	+8.14	+22.93	+13.22	+32.80	+26.87	+23.17	+24.73	+17.77	+13.84
Jharkhand	+11.19	+0.31	+16.86	+12.13	+9.35	+19.69	+22.58	+23.79	+24.03	+23.36	+22.42
Odisha	+10.44	-1.94	+11.94	+10.22	+6.38	+19.82	+25.05	+20.17	+20.06	+16.25	+14.05
Chhattisgarh	+24.15	+1.41	+14.51	+13.04	+9.42	+22.77	+27.12	+20.39	+25.73	+18.27	+22.61
Madhya Pradesh	+12.38	-2.40	+10.21	+12.06	+8.38	+24.73	+29.28	+27.16	+27.24	+24.26	+20.35
Gujarat	+7.79	+3.79	+12.92	+19.25	+18.69	+26.88	+29.39	+27.67	+21.19	+22.66	+19.28
Daman and Diu	+1.45	-3.26	+15.98	+17.52	+13.55	-24.56	+70.85	+26.07	+28.62	+55.73	+53.76
Dadra and Nagar Haveli	+19.52	+6.99	+23.23	+5.70	+2.70	+39.56	+27.96	+39.78	+33.57	+59.22	+55.88
Maharashtra	+10.74	-2.91	+14.91	+11.99	+19.27	+23.60	+27.45	+24.54	+25.73	+22.73	+15.99
Andhra Pradesh	+12.49	-0.13	+12.99	+12.75	+14.02	+15.65	+20.90	+23.10	+24.20	+14.59	+10.98
Karnataka	+3.60	-1.09	+9.38	+11.09	+19.36	+21.57	+24.22	+26.75	+21.12	+17.51	+15.60
Goa	+2.36	-3.55	+7.62	+7.05	+1.21	+7.77	+34.77	+26.74	+16.08	+15.21	+8.23
Lakshadweep	+4.85	-6.31	+17.62	+14.43	+14.60	+14.61	+31.95	+26.53	+28.47	+17.30	+6.30
Kerala	+11.75	+9.16	+21.85	+16.04	+22.82	+24.76	+26.29	+19.24	+14.32	+9.43	+4.91
Tamil Nadu	+8.57	+3.47	+8.52	+11.91	+14.66	+11.85	+22.30	+17.50	+15.39	+11.72	+15.61
Puducherry	+4.39	-5.06	+5.93	+10.20	+11.31	+16.34	+27.81	+28.15	+33.64	+20.62	+28.08
Andaman and Nicobar Islands	+7.34	+2.37	+8.78	+14.61	-8.28	+105.19	+81.17	+63.93	+48.70	+26.90	+6.86

=== Census of India: Sample Registration System ===
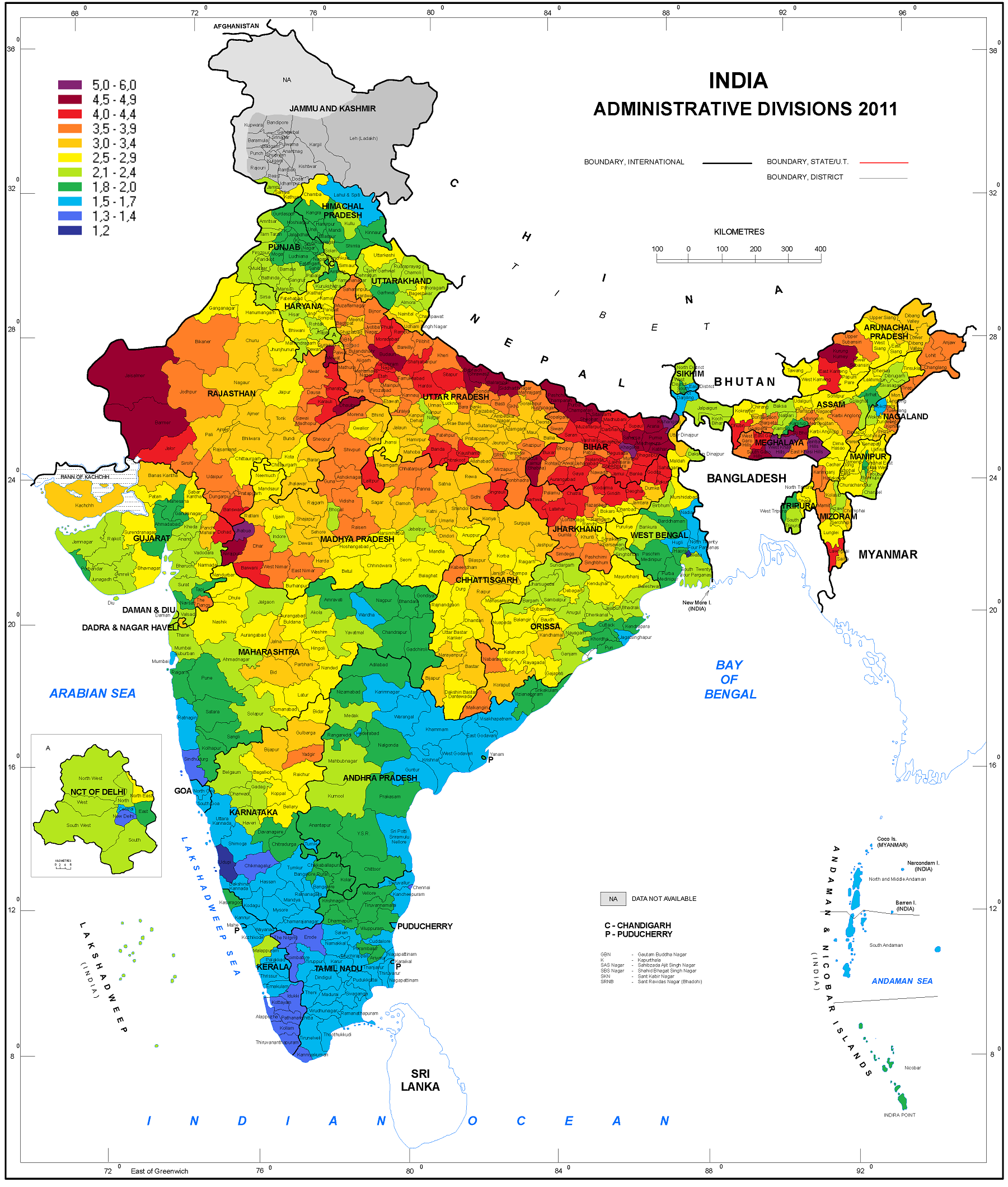
Total fertility rate map: average births per woman by districts, 2011

Census of India: Sample Registration System
Year	Average population	Live births^{1}	Deaths^{1}	Natural change	Crude birth rate (per 1000)	Crude death rate (per 1000)	Natural change (per 1000)	Total fertility rate
1981	716,493,000	24,289,000	8,956,000	15,333,000	33.9	12.5	21.4	4.52
1982	733,152,000	24,781,000	8,725,000	16,056,000	33.8	11.9	21.9	4.5
1983	750,034,000	25,276,000	8,925,000	16,351,000	33.7	11.9	21.8	4.5
1984	767,147,000	26,006,000	9,666,000	16,340,000	33.9	12.6	21.3	4.5
1985	784,491,000	25,810,000	9,257,000	16,553,000	32.9	11.8	21.1	4.3
1986	802,052,000	26,147,000	8,903,000	17,244,000	32.6	11.1	21.5	4.15
1987	819,800,000	26,316,000	8,936,000	17,380,000	32.1	10.9	21.2	4.1
1988	837,700,000	26,388,000	9,215,000	17,173,000	31.5	11.0	20.5	4.0
1989	855,707,000	26,185,000	8,814,000	17,371,000	30.6	10.3	20.3	3.9
1990	873,785,000	26,388,000	8,476,000	17,912,000	30.2	9.7	20.5	3.8
1991	891,910,000	26,133,000	8,741,000	17,392,000	29.3	9.8	19.5	3.64
1992	910,065,000	26,392,000	9,192,000	17,200,000	29.0	10.1	18.9	3.6
1993	928,226,000	26,640,000	8,633,000	18,007,000	0	9.3	19.4	3.5
1994	946,373,000	27,161,000	8,801,000	18,360,000	28.7	9.3	19.4	3.5
1995	964,486,000	27,295,000	8,680,000	18,615,000	28.3	9.0	19.3	3.5
1996	982,553,000	26,824,000	8,745,000	18,079,000	27.3	8.9	18.4	3.40
1997	1,000,558,000	27,215,000	8,905,000	18,310,000	27.2	8.9	18.3	3.3
1998	1,018,471,000	26,989,000	9,166,000	17,823,000	26.5	9.0	17.5	3.2
1999	1,036,259,000	26,943,000	9,015,000	17,928,000	26.0	8.7	17.3	3.2
2000	1,053,898,000	27,191,000	8,958,000	18,233,000	25.8	8.5	17.3	3.2
2001	1,071,374,000	27,213,000	9,000,000	18,213,000	25.4	8.4	17.0	3.10
2002	1,088,694,000	27,217,000	8,818,000	18,399,000	25.0	8.1	16.9	3.0
2003	1,105,886,000	27,426,000	8,847,000	18,579,000	24.8	8.0	16.8	3.0
2004	1,122,991,000	27,064,000	8,422,000	18,642,000	24.1	7.5	16.6	2.9
2005	1,140,043,000	27,133,000	8,664,000	18,469,000	23.8	7.6	16.2	2.9
2006	1,157,039,000	27,190,000	8,678,000	18,512,000	23.5	7.5	16.0	2.79
2007	1,134,024,000	26,195,954	8,391,778	17,804,176	23.1	7.4	15.7	2.7
2008	1,150,196,000	26,224,469	8,511,450	17,713,019	22.8	7.4	15.4	2.6
2009	1,166,228,000	26,240,130	8,513,464	17,726,666	22.5	7.3	15.2	2.6
2010	1,182,108,000	26,124,587	8,511,178	17,613,409	22.1	7.2	14.9	2.5
2011	1,197,658,000	26,108,944	8,503,372	17,605,572	21.8	7.1	14.7	2.44
2012	1,212,827,000	26,197,063	8,489,789	17,707,274	21.6	7.0	14.6	2.38
2013	1,227,012,000	26,258,057	8,589,084	17,668,973	21.4	7.0	14.4	2.34
2014	1,243,542,000	25,904,377	8,264,730	17,639,647	21.0	6.7	14.3	2.32
2015	1,259,108,000	26,189,446	8,184,202	18,005,244	20.8	6.5	14.3	2.27
2016	1,273,986,000	25,989,314	8,153,510	17,835,804	20.4	6.4	14.0	2.26
2017	1,288,522,000	26,028,144	8,117,689	17,910,455	20.2	6.3	13.9	2.18
2018	1,324,609,000	26,492,180	8,212,576	18,279,604	20.0	6.2	13.8	2.15
2019	1,338,995,000	24,820,886	7,641,076	17,179,810	18.5	5.7	12.8	2.08
2020	1,353,378,000	24,222,444	8,115,882	16,106,562	17.4	6.0	11.5	2.03
2021	1,414,203,889	27,294,135	10,606,529	16,687,606	19.3	7.5	11.8	2.00
2022	1,425,423,212	27,225,583	9,692,878	17,532,705	19.1	6.8	12.3	2.00
2023	1,438,069,596	26,460,481	9,203,645	17,256,836	18.4	6.4	12.0	1.91
2024	1,450,935,791	26,552,125	9,285,989	17,266,136	18.3	6.4	11.9	1.88
^{1} The numbers of births and deaths were calculated from the birth and death rates and the average population.

=== Life expectancy ===
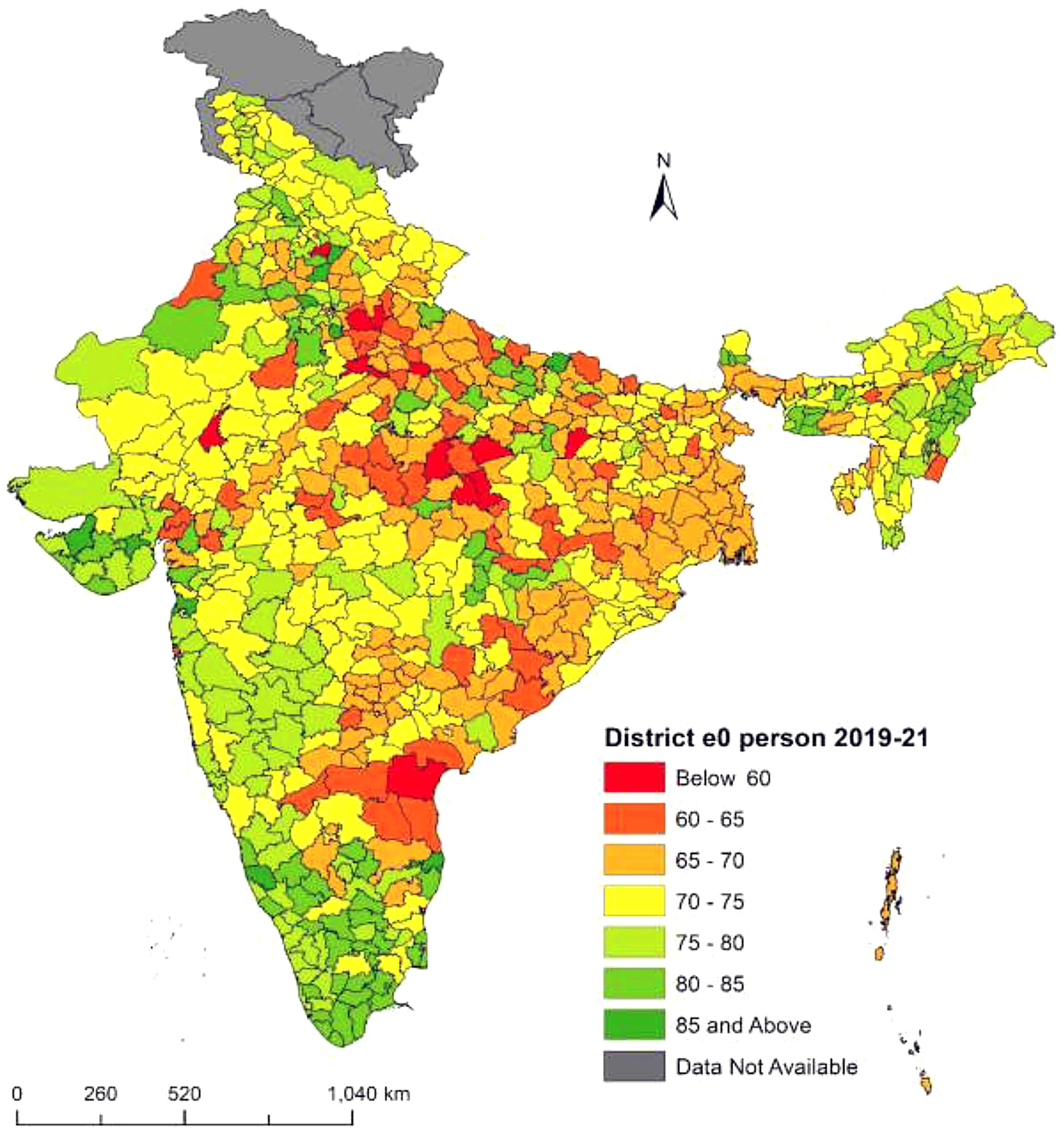
Life Expectancy at birth in India by district based on the analysis of NFHS-5 data (2019–2021)

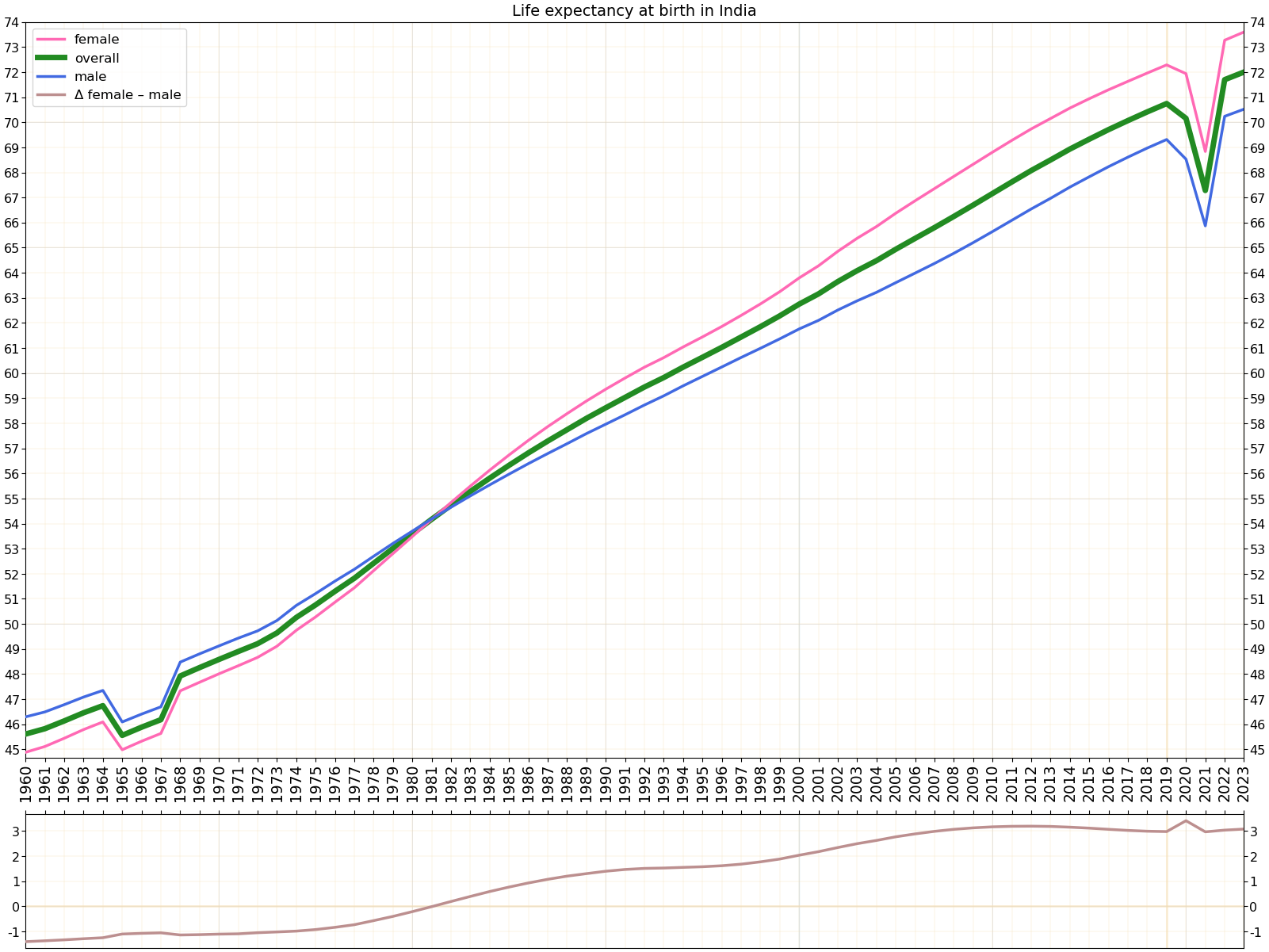
Life expectancy at birth in India since 1960 with calculated sex gap

Period	Life expectancy at birth	Life expectancy at age 15	Life expectancy at age 65	Life expectancy at age 80
1950	41.18	60.06	75.90	84.77
1955	43.74	60.96	76.14	84.86
1960	45.61	61.75	76.33	84.93
1965	45.56	61.84	76.20	84.91
1970	48.59	63.40	76.55	85.30
1975	50.76	64.68	77.00	85.69
1980	53.59	66.10	77.22	85.82
1985	56.32	67.35	77.30	85.81
1990	58.62	68.32	77.59	85.94
1995	60.63	69.08	78.06	86.22
2000	62.75	69.92	78.56	86.44
2005	64.94	70.84	78.87	86.45
2010	67.16	71.83	79.28	86.64
2015	69.33	72.88	79.91	87.14
2020	70.16	72.81	79.48	86.92

Demographic and Health Surveys From the Demographic Health Survey:

TFR of India to 2016

Crude birth rate and total fertility rate (wanted fertility rate)
Year	Total		Urban		Rural	
Year	CBR	TFR^{1}	CBR	TFR^{1}	CBR	TFR^{1}
1992–1993	28.7	3.39 (2.64)	24.1	2.70 (2.09)	30.4	3.67 (2.86)
1998–1999	24.8	2.85 (2.13)	20.9	2.27 (1.73)	26.2	3.07 (2.28)
2005–2006	23.1	2.68 (1.90)	18.8	2.06 (1.60)	25.0	2.98 (2.10)
2015–2016	19.0	2.18 (1.8)	15.8	1.75 (1.5)	20.7	2.41 (1.9)
2019–2021	17.1	1.99 (1.6)	14.0	1.63 (1.4)	18.6	2.14 (1.7)
CBR = crude birth rate (per 1000); TFR = total fertility rate (number of children per woman). ^{1}Number in parentheses represents the wanted fertility rate.

Total fertility rate (wanted fertility rate) by religion
Year	Hindu	Muslim	Christian	Sikh	Buddhist/ Neo-Buddhist	Jain	Other
2019–2021	1.94 (1.6)	2.36 (1.8)	1.88 (1.7)	1.61 (1.4)	1.39 (1.2)	1.60 (1.5)	2.15 (1.7)
CBR = crude birth rate (per 1000); TFR = total fertility rate (number of children per woman). ^{1}Number in parentheses represents the wanted fertility rate.

Crude birth rate and total fertility rate (wanted fertility rate) 2015–2016
State (Population 2011)	Total		Urban		Rural	
State (Population 2011)	CBR	TFR^{1}	CBR	TFR^{1}	CBR	TFR^{1}
Uttar Pradesh (199 812 341)	22.6	2.74 (2.06)	18.6	2.08 (1.62)	24.0	2.99 (2.22)
Maharashtra (112 374 333)	16.6	1.87 (1.57)	15.5	1.68 (1.41)	17.5	2.06 (1.73)
Bihar (104 099 452)	27.1	3.41 (2.48)	20.4	2.42 (1.83)	28.0	3.56 (2.58)
West Bengal (91 276 115)	16.6	1.77 (1.53)	14.0	1.57 (1.38)	18.0	1.85 (1.58)
Madhya Pradesh (72 626 809)	20.2	2.32 (1.82)	17.7	1.95 (1.61)	21.3	2.48 (1.91)
Tamil Nadu (72 147 030)	15.5	1.70 (1.51)	13.9	1.54 (1.38)	17.2	1.86 (1.63)
Rajasthan (68 548 437)	20.8	2.40 (1.81)	17.5	1.94 (1.52)	22.0	2.56 (1.91)
Karnataka (61 095 297)	15.9	1.81 (1.42)	15.2	1.65 (1.30)	16.5	1.92 (1.50)
Gujarat (60 439 692)	16.7	2.03 (1.54)	15.3	1.82 (1.39)	17.9	2.19 (1.64)
Andhra Pradesh (49 386 799)	16.1	1.83 (1.64)	13.9	1.53 (1.39)	17.0	1.96 (1.75)
Odisha (41 974 218)	18.1	2.05 (1.69)	15.6	1.73 (1.50)	18.7	2.12 (1.72)
Telangana (35 193 978)	17.1	1.79 (1.59)	17.1	1.67 (1.53)	17.2	1.88 (1.64)
Kerala (33 406 061)	11.2	1.56 (1.47)	11.4	1.57 (1.47)	11.0	1.55 (1.46)
Jharkhand (32 988 134)	21.7	2.55 (2.06)	16.3	1.78 (1.47)	23.5	2.83 (2.27)
Assam (31 205 576)	19.5	2.21 (1.78)	13.2	1.45 (1.25)	20.5	2.34 (1.87)
Punjab (27 743 338)	13.8	1.62 (1.37)	13.5	1.59 (1.32)	14.0	1.63 (1.39)
Chhattisgarh (25 545 198)	20.7	2.23 (1.88)	17.9	1.78 (1.58)	21.5	2.37 (1.97)
Haryana (25 351 462)	18.7	2.05 (1.63)	16.3	1.78 (1.44)	20.2	2.22 (1.75)
Jammu and Kashmir (12 541 302)	17.7	2.01 (1.67)	13.9	1.58 (1.39)	19.4	2.18 (1.77)
Uttarakhand (10 086 292)	19.0	2.07 (1.60)	17.1	1.80 (1.43)	20.0	2.24 (1.71)
Himachal Pradesh (6 864 602)	15.3	1.88 (1.55)	12.0	1.43 (1.15)	15.7	1.92 (1.59)
Tripura (3 673 917)	15.3	1.69 (1.55)	12.7	1.40 (1.34)	16.4	1.80 (1.62)
Meghalaya (2 966 889)	24.6	3.04 (2.79)	16.1	1.67 (1.57)	26.7	3.47 (3.18)
Manipur (2 855 794)	21.2	2.61 (2.33)	17.5	2.14 (1.96)	23.7	2.92 (2.57)
Nagaland (1 978 502)	21.4	2.74 (2.35)	16.3	1.78 (1.58)	24.1	3.38 (2.86)
Goa (1 458 545)	12.8	1.66 (1.37)	13.4	1.72 (1.37)	11.7	1.55 (1.37)
Arunachal Pradesh (1 383 727)	17.9	2.12 (1.64)	17.0	1.69 (1.26)	18.2	2.29 (1.79)
Mizoram (1 097 206)	18.7	2.26 (2.15)	16.9	1.97 (1.89)	21.2	2.71 (2.54)
Sikkim (610 577)	11.4	1.17 (0.88)	12.1	1.11 (0.82)	11.1	1.21 (0.91)
CBR = crude birth rate (per 1000); TFR = total fertility rate (number of children per woman). ^{1}Number in parentheses represents the wanted fertility rate.

Crude birth rate and total fertility rate (wanted fertility rate) 2019–2021
State (Population 2011)	Total		Urban		Rural	
State (Population 2011)	CBR	TFR^{1}	CBR	TFR^{1}	CBR	TFR^{1}
Uttar Pradesh (199 812 341)	20.5	2.35 (1.77)	16.7	1.88 (1.49)	21.8	2.50 (1.86)
Maharashtra (112 374 333)	13.8	1.71 (1.43)	12.6	1.50 (1.27)	15.0	1.89 (1.58)
Bihar (104 099 452)	25.9	2.98 (2.25)	20.4	2.35 (1.88)	27.0	3.11 (2.31)
West Bengal (91 276 115)	15.5	1.64 (1.42)	12.4	1.39 (1.24)	17.0	1.73 (1.48)
Madhya Pradesh (72 626 809)	17.2	1.99 (1.61)	13.7	1.61 (1.34)	18.5	2.12 (1.69)
Tamil Nadu (72 147 030)	13.7	1.76 (1.59)	12.7	1.61 (1.50)	14.6	1.89 (1.66)
Rajasthan (68 548 437)	18.7	2.01 (1.61)	15.3	1.67 (1.42)	19.8	2.11 (1.65)
Karnataka (61 095 297)	14.2	1.67 (1.38)	13.2	1.50 (1.25)	14.9	1.79 (1.46)
Gujarat (60 439 692)	15.0	1.86 (1.53)	13.3	1.65 (1.39)	16.3	2.0 (1.60)
Andhra Pradesh (49 386 799)	13.8	1.68 (1.55)	12.5	1.47 (1.36)	14.3	1.78 (1.64)
Odisha (41 974 218)	15.9	1.82 (1.52)	13.1	1.48 (1.26)	16.5	1.89 (1.57)
Telangana (35 193 978)	15.3	1.75 (1.55)	16.0	1.75 (1.57)	15.3	1.74 (1.54)
Kerala (33 406 061)	11.8	1.79 (1.68)	11.9	1.82 (1.71)	11.6	1.76 (1.65)
Jharkhand (32 988 134)	20.2	2.26 (1.87)	14.2	1.56 (1.32)	22.0	2.48 (2.04)
Assam (31 205 576)	16.8	1.87 (1.56)	13.1	1.50 (1.37)	17.4	1.93 (1.59)
Punjab (27 743 338)	13.3	1.63 (1.35)	12.1	1.55 (1.29)	14.0	1.68 (1.38)
Chhattisgarh (25 545 198)	16.4	1.82 (1.57)	13.6	1.42 (1.28)	17.2	1.94 (1.66)
Haryana (25 351 462)	16.4	1.91 (1.54)	14.1	1.65 (1.38)	17.5	2.04 (1.62)
Jammu and Kashmir (12 541 302)	13.1	1.41 (1.3)				
Uttarakhand (10 086 292)	16.7	1.85 (1.46)	16.8	1.84 (1.47)	16.6	1.86 (1.47)
Himachal Pradesh (6 864 602)	12.7	1.66 (1.43)	11.2	1.43 (1.36)	12.9	1.69 (1.44)
Tripura (3 673 917)	14.5	1.70 (1.49)	11.0	1.39 (1.29)	15.8	1.81 (1.56)
Meghalaya (2 966 889)	24.2	2.91 (2.66)	14.8	1.57 (1.43)	26.5	3.31 (3.04)
Manipur (2 855 794)	17.4	2.17 (1.98)	14.7	1.84 (1.73)	19.1	2.38 (2.13)
Nagaland (1 978 502)	15.4	1.72 (1.57)	12.5	1.21 (1.13)	16.8	2.00 (1.82)
Goa (1 458 545)	10.3	1.30 (1.21)	10.3	1.26 (1.19)	10.3	1.36 (1.24)
Arunachal Pradesh (1 383 727)	16.0	1.80 (1.49)	14.8	1.44 (1.24)	16.2	1.88 (1.54)
Mizoram (1 097 206)	15.0	1.87 (1.78)	13.9	1.63 (1.56)	16.4	2.19 (2.08)
Sikkim (610 577)	10.2	1.05 (0.85)	7.8	0.71 (0.54)	11.7	1.32 (1.11)
Delhi	14.8	1.62 (1.29)	14.6	1.60 (1.27)	23.4	2.47 (2.06)
CBR = crude birth rate (per 1000); TFR = total fertility rate (number of children per woman). ^{1}Number in parentheses represents the wanted fertility rate.

Regional vital statistics

Birth rate, death rate, natural growth rate, and infant mortality rate, by state and UT(2010)
State or UT	Birth rate			Death rate			Natural growth rate			Infant mortality rate		
State or UT	Total	Rural	Urban	Total	Rural	Urban	Total	Rural	Urban	Total	Rural	Urban
Andaman and Nicobar Islands	15.6	15.5	15.8	4.3	4.8	3.3	11.3	10.7	12.6	25	29	18
Andhra Pradesh	17.9	18.3	16.7	7.6	8.6	5.4	10.2	9.7	11.3	46	51	33
Arunachal Pradesh	20.5	22.1	14.6	5.9	6.9	2.3	14.6	15.2	12.3	31	34	12
Assam	23.2	24.4	15.8	8.2	8.6	5.8	14.9	15.8	10.1	58	60	36
Bihar	28.1	28.8	22.0	6.8	7.0	5.6	21.3	21.8	16.4	48	49	38
Chandigarh	15.6	21.6	15.0	3.9	3.7	3.9	11.6	17.9	11.0	22	20	23
Chhattisgarh	25.3	26.8	18.6	8.0	8.4	6.2	17.3	18.4	12.4	51	52	44
Dadra and Nagar Haveli	26.6	26.0	28.6	4.7	5.1	3.3	21.9	20.9	25.3	38	43	22
Daman and Diu	18.8	19.1	18.3	4.9	4.9	4.8	13.9	14.2	13.6	23	19	29
Delhi	17.8	19.7	17.5	4.2	4.6	4.1	13.6	15.0	13.4	30	37	29
Goa	13.2	12.6	13.7	6.6	8.1	5.7	6.6	4.5	8.0	10	10	10
Gujarat	21.8	23.3	19.4	6.7	7.5	5.5	15.1	15.8	14.0	44	51	30
Haryana	22.3	23.3	19.8	6.6	7.0	5.6	15.7	16.3	14.3	48	51	38
Himachal Pradesh	16.9	17.5	11.5	6.9	7.2	4.2	10.0	10.3	7.3	40	41	29
Jammu and Kashmir	18.3	19.5	13.5	5.7	5.9	4.7	12.6	13.6	8.8	43	45	32
Jharkhand	25.3	26.7	19.3	7.0	7.4	5.4	18.3	19.3	13.9	42	44	30
Karnataka	19.2	20.2	17.5	7.1	8.1	5.4	12.1	12.1	12.1	38	43	28
Kerala	14.8	14.8	14.8	7.0	7.1	6.7	7.8	7.7	8.1	13	14	10
Lakshadweep	14.3	15.5	13.2	6.4	6.1	6.7	8.0	9.5	6.5	25	23	27
Madhya Pradesh	27.3	29.2	20.5	8.3	9.0	6.0	18.9	20.2	14.5	62	67	42
Maharashtra	17.1	17.6	16.4	6.5	7.5	5.3	10.6	10.2	11.1	28	34	20
Manipur	14.9	14.8	15.3	4.2	4.3	4.0	10.7	10.5	11.3	14	15	9
Meghalaya	24.5	26.6	14.8	7.9	8.4	5.6	16.6	18.2	9.2	55	58	37
Mizoram	17.1	21.1	13.0	4.5	5.4	3.7	12.5	15.7	9.3	37	47	21
Nagaland	16.8	17.0	16.0	3.6	3.7	3.3	13.2	13.3	12.7	23	24	20
Odisha	20.5	21.4	15.2	8.6	9.0	6.6	11.9	12.4	8.6	61	63	43
Puducherry	16.7	16.7	16.7	7.4	8.2	7.0	9.3	8.5	9.6	22	25	21
Punjab	16.6	17.2	15.6	7.0	7.7	5.8	9.6	9.5	9.8	34	37	28
Rajasthan	26.7	27.9	22.9	6.7	6.9	6.0	20.0	20.9	16.9	55	61	31
Sikkim	17.8	18.1	16.1	5.6	5.9	3.8	12.3	12.3	12.3	30	31	19
Tamil Nadu	15.9	16.0	15.8	7.6	8.2	6.9	8.3	7.8	8.9	24	25	22
Tripura	14.9	15.6	11.5	5.0	4.8	5.7	9.9	10.8	5.8	27	29	19
Uttar Pradesh	28.3	29.2	24.2	8.1	8.5	6.3	20.2	20.7	17.9	61	64	44
Uttarakhand	19.3	20.2	16.2	6.3	6.7	5.1	13.0	13.5	11.1	38	41	25
West Bengal	16.8	18.6	11.9	6.0	6.0	6.3	10.7	12.6	5.6	31	32	25

Neonatal and infant demographics

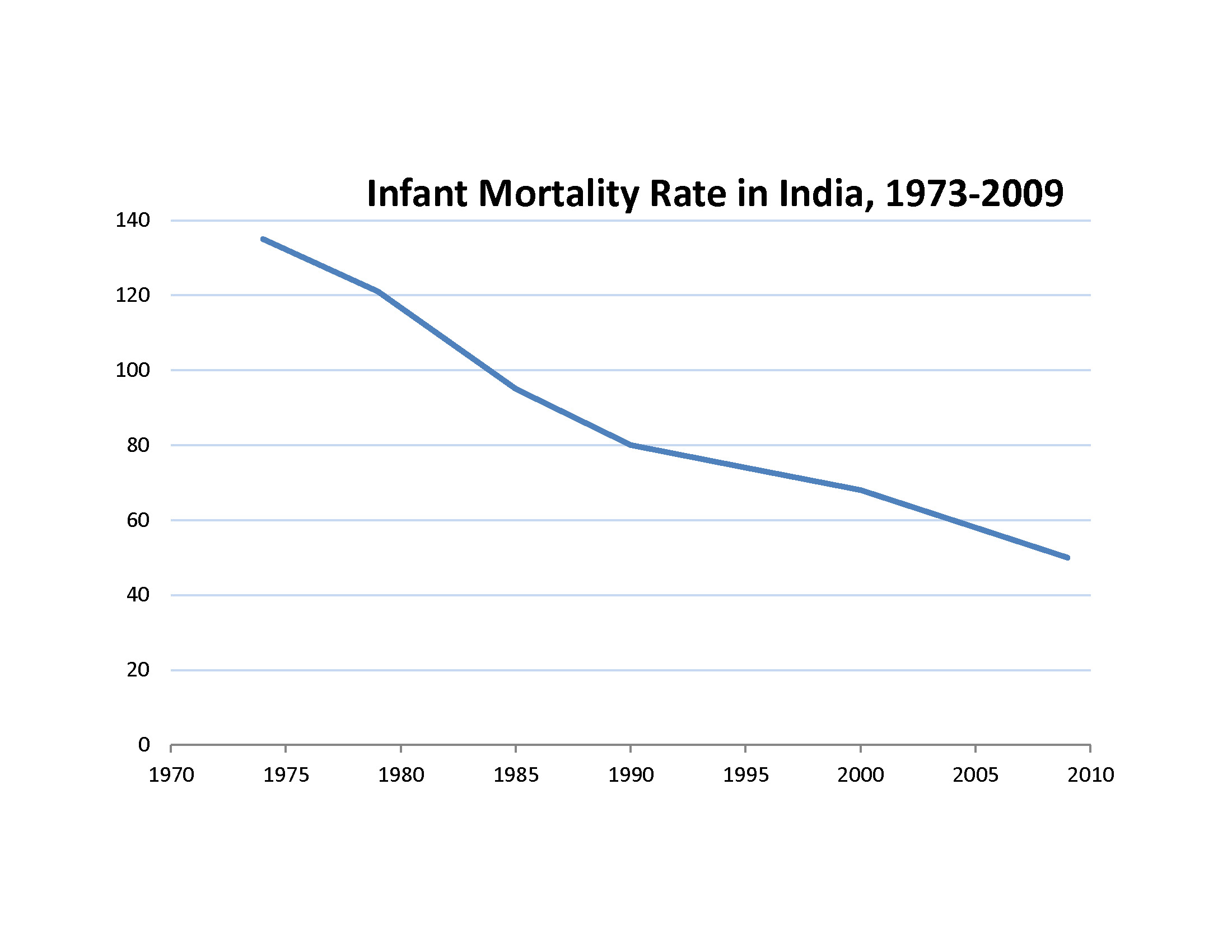
Infant mortality rate trends in India (per 1000 births, under age 1, national average)

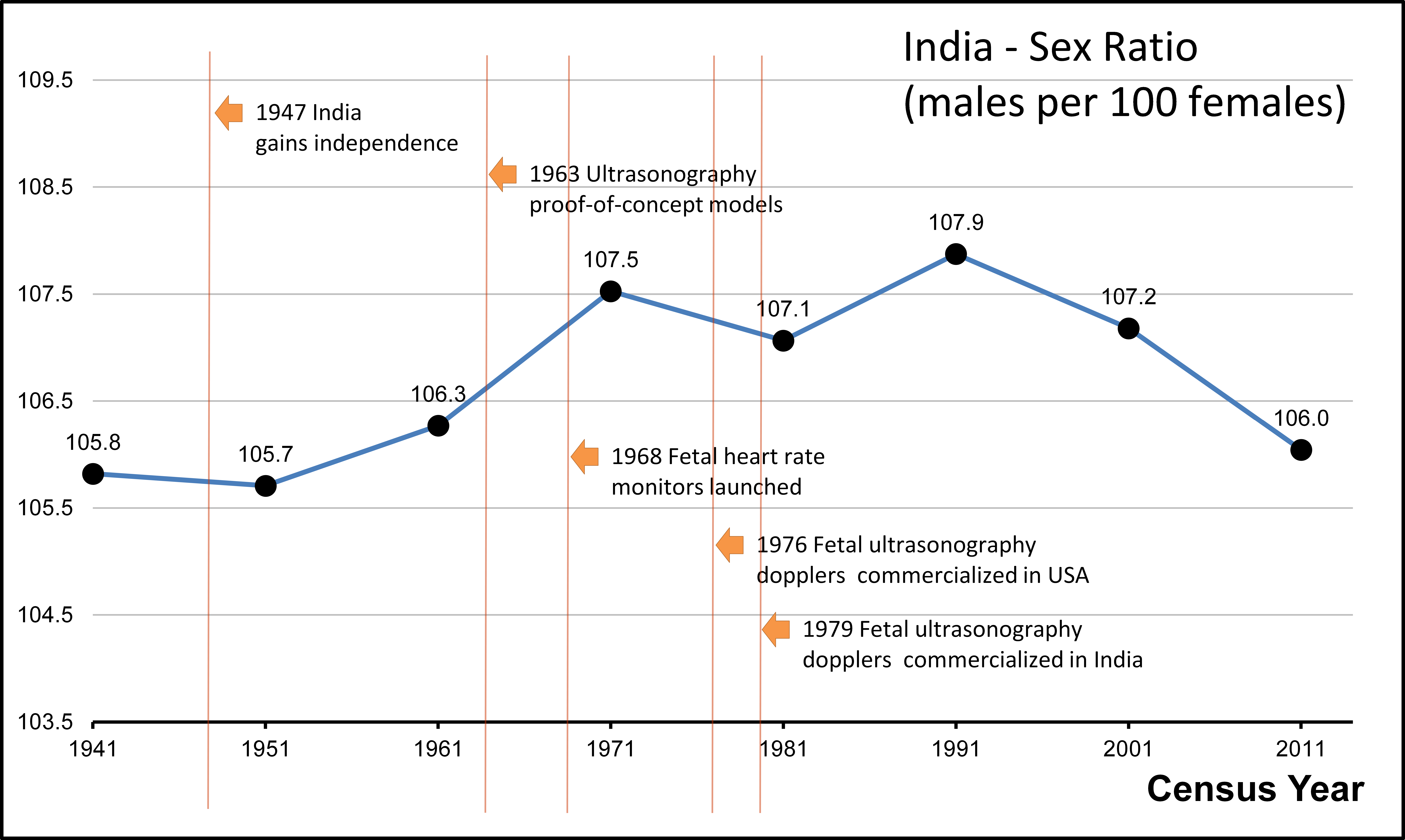
Male to female sex ratio for India, based on its official census data, from 1941 through 2011. The data suggest the existence of high sex ratios before and after the arrival of ultrasound-based prenatal care and sex screening technologies in India.

The table below represents the infant mortality rate trends in India, based on sex, over the last 15 years. In the urban areas of India, average male infant mortality rates are slightly higher than average female infant mortality rates.

Infant mortality rate trend (deaths per 1000) As per NFHS & UNICEF Data.
Year	Male	Female	Total
1998	69.8	73.5	71.6
2005	56.3	58	57
2009	49	52	—N/a
2014	43.7	37.90	40.7
2018	29.95	29.88	29.94

India's 2011 census shows a serious decline in the number of girls under the age of seven – activists posit that eight million female fetuses may have been aborted between 2001 and 2011.

== Ethnic groups ==
Ethno-Linguistic groups in India chart (2011)
1. Indo-Aryan (78.0%)
2. Dravidian (19.6%)
3. Austroasiatic (1.11%)
4. Tibeto-Burman (1.01%)
5. Others (0.19%)

The national Census of India does not recognise racial or ethnic groups within India, but recognises many of the tribal groups as Scheduled Castes and Tribes (see list of Scheduled Tribes in India). For a list of ethnic groups in the Republic of India (as well as neighbouring countries), see South Asian ethnic groups. According to a 2009 study published by Reich et al., the modern Indian population is composed of two genetically divergent and heterogeneous populations which mixed in ancient times (about 1,200–3,500 BP), known as Ancestral North Indians (ANI) and Ancestral South Indians (ASI). ANI corresponds to the Indo-Aryan-speaking population of northern India, whereas ASI corresponds to the Dravidian-speaking population of southern India. 700,000 people from the United States of any race live in India. Around 150,000 Anglo-Indian people still live in India. India is a country with a vast diversity of ethnic groups, each with its own distinct culture, language, and traditions. The major ethnic groups in India include the Indo-Aryans, Dravidians, Sino-Tibetans, Austroasiatic peoples, and various indigenous tribes. These groups are spread across different regions of India, each contributing to the country's rich cultural mosaic.

== Population size and structure ==
Map showing the population density in India, per 2011 Census.

India occupies 2.41% of the world's land area but supports over 18% of the world's population. At the 2001 census 72.2% of the population lived in about 638,000 villages and the remaining 27.8% lived in more than 5,100 towns and over 380 urban agglomerations. By 2011, the share of the population living in rural areas decreased to 68.84%, while that of those living in urban areas increased to 31.16%. India's population exceeded that of the entire continent of Africa by 200 million people in 2010. However, because Africa's population growth is extremely high compared to the rest of the world, it is expected to surpass both China and India by the early 2030s. Comparative demographics

Comparative demographics
Category	Global ranking	References
Area	7th	
Population	1st	
Population growth rate	102nd of 212	in 2010
Population density	24th of 212	in 2010
Male to Female ratio, at birth	12th of 214	in 2009

Population growth of India per decade
Census year	Population	Change (%)
1951	361,088,003	–
1961	439,235,000	21.6
1971	548,160,000	24.8
1981	683,329,000	24.7
1991	846,387,888	23.9
2001	1,028,737,436	21.5
2011	1,210,193,422	17.7

List of states and union territories by demographics

Population distribution by states/union territories (2011)
Rank	State/UT	Population	Percent (%)	Male	Female	Difference between male and female	Sex ratio	Rural	Urban	Area (km^{2})	Density (per km^{2})
1	Uttar Pradesh	199,812,341	16.50	104,480,510	95,331,831	9,148,679	930	155,111,022	44,470,455	240,928	828
2	Maharashtra	112,374,333	9.28	58,243,056	54,131,277	4,111,779	929	61,545,441	50,827,531	307,713	365
3	Bihar	104,099,452	8.60	54,278,157	49,821,295	4,456,862	918	92,075,028	11,729,609	94,163	1,102
4	West Bengal	91,276,115	7.54	46,809,027	44,467,088	2,341,939	950	62,213,676	29,134,060	88,752	1,030
5	Madhya Pradesh	72,626,809	6.00	37,612,306	35,014,503	2,597,803	931	52,537,899	20,059,666	308,245	236
6	Tamil Nadu	72,147,030	5.96	36,137,975	36,009,055	128,920	996	37,189,229	34,949,729	130,058	555
7	Rajasthan	68,548,437	5.66	35,550,997	32,997,440	2,553,557	928	51,540,236	17,080,776	342,239	201
8	Karnataka	61,095,297	5.05	30,966,657	30,128,640	838,017	973	37,552,529	23,578,175	191,791	319
9	Gujarat	60,439,692	4.99	31,491,260	28,948,432	2,542,828	919	34,670,817	25,712,811	196,024	308
10	Andhra Pradesh	49,386,799	4.08	24,738,068	24,648,731	89,337	996	34,776,389	14,610,410	160,205	308
11	Odisha	41,974,218	3.47	21,212,136	20,762,082	450,054	979	34,951,234	6,996,124	155,707	269
12	Telangana	35,193,978	2.91	17,704,078	17,489,900	214,178	988	21,585,313	13,608,665	114,840	307
13	Kerala	33,406,061	2.76	16,027,412	17,378,649	−1,351,237	1084	17,445,506	15,932,171	38,863	859
14	Jharkhand	32,988,134	2.72	16,930,315	16,057,819	872,496	948	25,036,946	7,929,292	79,714	414
15	Assam	31,205,576	2.58	15,939,443	15,266,133	673,310	958	26,780,526	4,388,756	78,438	397
16	Punjab	27,743,338	2.29	14,639,465	13,103,873	1,535,592	895	17,316,800	10,387,436	50,362	550
17	Chhattisgarh	25,545,198	2.11	12,832,895	12,712,303	120,592	991	19,603,658	5,936,538	135,191	189
18	Haryana	25,351,462	2.09	13,494,734	11,856,728	1,638,006	879	16,531,493	8,821,588	44,212	573
19	Delhi (UT)	16,787,941	1.39	8,887,326	7,800,615	1,086,711	868	944,727	12,905,780	1,484	11,297
20	Jammu and Kashmir	12,541,302	1.04	6,640,662	5,900,640	740,022	889	9,134,820	3,414,106	222,236	56
21	Uttarakhand	10,086,292	0.83	5,137,773	4,948,519	189,254	963	7,025,583	3,091,169	53,483	189
22	Himachal Pradesh	6,864,602	0.57	3,481,873	3,382,729	99,144	972	6,167,805	688,704	55,673	123
23	Tripura	3,673,917	0.30	1,874,376	1,799,541	74,835	960	2,710,051	960,981	10,486	350
24	Meghalaya	2,966,889	0.25	1,491,832	1,475,057	16,775	989	2,368,971	595,036	22,429	132
25	Manipur	2,855,794	0.24	1,438,687	1,417,107	21,580	985	1,899,624	822,132	22,327	128
26	Nagaland	1,978,502	0.16	1,024,649	953,853	70,796	931	1,406,861	573,741	16,579	119
27	Goa	1,458,545	0.12	739,140	719,405	19,735	973	551,414	906,309	3,702	394
28	Arunachal Pradesh	1,383,727	0.11	713,912	669,815	44,097	938	1,069,165	313,446	83,743	17
29	Puducherry (UT)	1,247,953	0.10	612,511	635,442	−22,931	1037	394,341	850,123	479	2,598
30	Mizoram	1,097,206	0.09	555,339	541,867	13,472	976	529,037	561,997	21,081	52
31	Chandigarh (UT)	1,055,450	0.09	580,663	474,787	105,876	818	29,004	1,025,682	114	9,252
32	Sikkim	610,577	0.05	323,070	287,507	35,563	890	455,962	151,726	7,096	86
33	Andaman and Nicobar Islands (UT)	380,581	0.03	202,871	177,710	25,161	876	244,411	135,533	8,249	46
34	Dadra and Nagar Haveli (UT)	343,709	0.03	193,760	149,949	43,811	774	183,024	159,829	491	698
35	Daman and Diu (UT)	243,247	0.02	150,301	92,946	57,355	618	60,331	182,580	112	2,169
36	Lakshadweep (UT)	64,473	0.01	33,123	31,350	1,773	946	14,121	50,308	32	2,013
–	Total (India)	1,210,854,977	100	623,724,248	586,469,174	35,585,741	943	833,087,662	377,105,760	3,287,240	382

Literacy rate

Literacy rate map of India, 2011.

Literacy rate by state/union territory in 2011
State or UT code	State or UT	Overall (%)	Male (%)	Female (%)
1	Jammu and Kashmir	68.74%	76.75%	58.01%
2	Himachal Pradesh	83.78%	90.83%	76.60%
3	Punjab	75.84%	81.48%	71.34%
4	Chandigarh	86.43%	90.54%	81.38%
5	Uttarakhand	79.63%	88.33%	70.70%
6	Haryana	76.64%	85.38%	66.77%
7	Delhi	86.34%	91.03%	80.93%
8	Rajasthan	67.06%	80.51%	52.66%
9	Uttar Pradesh	69.72%	79.24%	59.26%
10	Bihar	63.82%	73.39%	53.33%
11	Sikkim	82.20%	87.29%	76.43%
12	Arunachal Pradesh	66.95%	73.69%	59.57%
13	Nagaland	80.11%	83.29%	76.69%
14	Manipur	79.85%	86.49%	73.17%
15	Mizoram	91.58%	93.72%	89.40%
16	Tripura	87.75%	92.18%	83.15%
17	Meghalaya	75.48%	77.17%	73.78%
18	Assam	73.18%	78.81%	67.27%
19	West Bengal	77.08%	82.67%	71.16%
20	Jharkhand	67.63%	78.45%	56.21%
21	Odisha	72.90%	82.40%	64.36%
22	Chhattisgarh	71.04%	81.45%	60.59%
23	Madhya Pradesh	70.63%	80.53%	60.02%
24	Gujarat	79.31%	87.23%	70.73%
25	Daman and Diu	87.07%	91.48%	79.59%
26	Dadra and Nagar Haveli	77.65%	86.46%	65.93%
27	Maharashtra	83.20%	89.82%	75.48%
28	Andhra Pradesh	67.35%	74.77%	59.96%
29	Karnataka	75.60%	82.85%	68.13%
30	Goa	87.40%	92.81%	81.84%
31	Lakshadweep	92.28%	96.11%	88.25%
32	Kerala	93.91%	96.02%	91.98%
33	Tamil Nadu	80.33%	86.81%	73.86%
34	Puducherry	86.55%	92.12%	81.22%
35	Andaman and Nicobar Islands	86.27%	90.11%	81.84%
–	Overall (India)	74.03%	82.14%	65.46%

Population Estimates by Sex and Age Group (Census 09.II.2011):

Age group	Male	Female	Total	Percentage (%)	Cumulative percentage
0–4	58,632,074	54,174,704	112,806,778	9.32	9.32
5–9	66,300,466	60,627,660	126,928,126	10.48	19.8
10–14	69,418,835	63,290,377	132,709,212	10.96	30.76
15–19	63,982,396	56,544,053	120,526,449	9.95	40.71
20–24	57,584,693	53,839,529	111,424,222	9.20	49.91
25–29	51,344,208	50,069,757	101,413,965	8.38	58.29
30–34	44,660,674	43,934,277	88,594,951	7.32	65.61
35–39	42,919,381	42,221,303	85,140,684	7.03	72.64
40–44	37,545,386	34,892,726	72,438,112	5.98	78.62
45–49	32,138,114	30,180,213	62,318,327	5.15	83.77
50–54	25,843,266	23,225,988	49,069,254	4.05	87.82
55–59	19,456,012	19,690,043	39,146,055	3.23	91.05
60–64	18,701,749	18,961,958	37,663,707	3.11	94.16
65–69	12,944,326	13,510,657	26,454,983	2.18	96.34
70–74	9,651,499	9,557,343	19,208,842	1.59	97.93
75–79	4,490,603	4,741,900	9,232,503	0.76	98.69
80–84	2,927,040	3,293,189	6,220,229	0.51	99.2
85–89	1,120,106	1,263,061	2,383,167	0.20	99.4
90–94	652,465	794,069	1,446,534	0.12	99.52
95–99	294,759	338,538	633,297	0.05	99.57
100+	289,325	316,453	605,778	0.05	99.62
Unknown	2,372,881	2,116,921	4,489,802	0.37	99.99
Total	623,270,258	587,584,719	1,210,854,977	100.00	
Age group	Male	Female	Total	Percent	
0–14	194,351,375	178,092,741	372,444,116	30.76	
15–64	394,175,879	373,559,847	767,735,726	63.40	
65+	32,370,123	33,815,210	66,185,333	5.47	

Population Estimates by Sex and Age Group (01.III.2016):

Age group	Male	Female	Total	%
Total	664,184,000	626,890,000	1,291,074,000	100
0–4	62,872,000	56,038,000	118,910,000	9.21
5–9	61,499,000	56,969,000	118,468,000	9.18
10–14	65,142,000	59,682,000	124,824,000	9.67
15–19	67,223,000	60,871,000	128,094,000	9.92
20–24	63,521,000	57,356,000	120,877,000	9.36
25–29	57,272,000	53,357,000	110,629,000	8.57
30–34	50,782,000	49,250,000	100,032,000	7.75
35–39	45,318,000	44,787,000	90,105,000	6.98
40–44	41,280,000	40,497,000	81,777,000	6.33
45–49	36,602,000	35,107,000	71,709,000	5.55
50–54	30,738,000	29,016,000	59,754,000	4.63
55–59	24,403,000	23,307,000	47,710,000	3.70
60–64	19,133,000	19,288,000	38,421,000	2.98
65–69	15,198,000	16,114,000	31,312,000	2.43
70–74	11,002,000	11,723,000	22,725,000	1.76
75–79	7,703,000	8,367,000	16,070,000	1.24
80+	4,496,000	5,161,000	9,657,000	0.75
Age group	Male	Female	Total	Percent
0–14	189,513,000	172,689,000	362,202,000	28.05
15–64	436,272,000	412,836,000	849,108,000	65.77
65+	38,399,000	41,365,000	79,764,000	6.18

Population Estimates by Sex and Age Group (01.VII.2021):

Age group	Male	Female	Total	%
Total	700,623,000	662,383,000	1,363,006,000	100
0–4	60,153,000	54,120,000	114,273,000	8.38
5–9	62,276,000	55,390,000	117,666,000	8.63
10–14	61,266,000	56,785,000	118,051,000	8.66
15–19	64,862,000	59,420,000	124,282,000	9.12
20–24	66,770,000	60,474,000	127,244,000	9.34
25–29	62,944,000	56,956,000	119,900,000	8.80
30–34	56,614,000	52,961,000	109,575,000	8.04
35–39	50,027,000	48,836,000	98,863,000	7.25
40–44	44,450,000	44,315,000	88,765,000	6.51
45–49	40,204,000	39,903,000	80,107,000	5.88
50–54	35,235,000	34,331,000	69,566,000	5.10
55–59	29,082,000	28,062,000	57,144,000	4.19
60–64	22,465,000	22,079,000	44,544,000	3.27
65–69	16,823,000	17,583,000	34,406,000	2.52
70–74	12,546,000	13,904,000	26,450,000	1.94
75–79	8,269,000	9,294,000	17,563,000	1.29
80+	6,637,000	7,970,000	14,607,000	1.07
Age group	Male	Female	Total	Percent
0–14	183,695,000	166,295,000	349,990,000	25.68
15–64	472,653,000	447,337,000	919,990,000	67.50
65+	44,275,000	48,751,000	93,026,000	6.83

Population between age 0–6 by state/union territory
State or UT code	State or UT	Total	Male	Female	Difference
1	Jammu and Kashmir	2,008,670	1,080,662	927,982	152,680
2	Himachal Pradesh	763,864	400,681	363,183	37,498
3	Punjab	2,941,570	1,593,262	1,348,308	244,954
4	Chandigarh	117,953	63,187	54,766	8,421
5	Uttarakhand	1,328,844	704,769	624,075	80,694
6	Haryana	3,297,724	1,802,047	1,495,677	306,370
7	Delhi	1,970,510	1,055,735	914,775	140,960
8	Rajasthan	10,504,916	5,580,212	4,924,004	656,208
9	Uttar Pradesh	29,728,235	15,653,175	14,075,060	1,578,115
10	Bihar	18,582,229	9,615,280	8,966,949	648,331
11	Sikkim	61,077	31,418	29,659	1,759
12	Arunachal Pradesh	202,759	103,430	99,330	4,100
13	Nagaland	285,981	147,111	138,870	8,241
14	Manipur	353,237	182,684	170,553	12,131
15	Mizoram	165,536	83,965	81,571	2,394
16	Tripura	444,055	227,354	216,701	10,653
17	Meghalaya	555,822	282,189	273,633	8,556
18	Assam	4,511,307	2,305,088	2,206,219	98,869
19	West Bengal	10,112,599	5,187,264	4,925,335	261,929
20	Jharkhand	5,237,582	2,695,921	2,541,661	154,260
21	Odisha	5,035,650	2,603,208	2,432,442	170,766
22	Chhattisgarh	3,584,028	1,824,987	1,759,041	65,946
23	Madhya Pradesh	10,548,295	5,516,957	5,031,338	485,619
24	Gujarat	7,564,464	3,974,286	3,519,890	454,396
25	Daman and Diu	25,880	13,556	12,314	1,242
26	Dadra and Nagar Haveli	49,196	25,575	23,621	1,954
27	Maharashtra	12,848,375	6,822,262	6,026,113	796,149
28	Andhra Pradesh	8,642,686	4,448,330	4,194,356	253,974
29	Karnataka	6,855,801	3,527,844	3,327,957	199,887
30	Goa	139,495	72,669	66,826	5,843
31	Lakshadweep	7,088	3,715	3,373	342
32	Kerala	3,322,247	1,695,889	1,626,358	69,531
33	Tamil Nadu	6,894,821	3,542,351	3,352,470	189,881
34	Puducherry	127,610	64,932	62,678	2,254
35	Andaman and Nicobar Islands	39,497	20,094	19,403	691
–	Total (India)	158,789,287	82,952,135	75,837,152	7,114,983

Population above the age of seven by state/union territory
State or UT code	State or UT	Total	Male	Female
1	Jammu and Kashmir	–	–	–
2	Himachal Pradesh	–	–	–
3	Punjab	–	–	–
4	Chandigarh	–	–	–
5	Uttarakhand	–	–	–
6	Haryana	22,055,357	11,703,083	10,352,274
7	Delhi	14,782,725	7,920,675	6,862,050
8	Rajasthan	58,116,096	30,039,874	28,076,222
9	Uttar Pradesh	169,853,242	88,943,240	80,910,002
10	Bihar	85,222,408	44,570,067	40,652,341
11	Sikkim	546,611	290,243	256,368
12	Arunachal Pradesh	1,179,852	616,802	563,050
13	Nagaland	1,694,621	878,596	816,025
14	Manipur	2,368,519	1,187,080	1,181,439
15	Mizoram	925,478	468,374	457,104
16	Tripura	3,226,977	1,644,513	1,582,464
17	Meghalaya	2,408,185	1,210,479	1,197,706
18	Assam	26,657,965	13,649,839	13,008,126
19	West Bengal	81,235,137	41,740,125	39,495,012
20	Jharkhand	27,728,656	14,235,767	13,492,889
21	Odisha	36,911,708	18,598,470	18,313,238
22	Chhattisgarh	21,956,168	11,002,928	10,953,240
23	Madhya Pradesh	62,049,270	32,095,963	29,953,307
24	Gujarat	52,889,452	27,507,996	25,381,456
25	Daman and Diu	217,031	136,544	80,487
26	Dadra and Nagar Haveli	293,657	167,603	126,054
27	Maharashtra	99,524,597	51,539,135	47,985,462
28	Andhra Pradesh	76,022,847	38,061,551	37,961,296
29	Karnataka	54,274,903	27,529,898	26,745,005
30	Goa	1,318,228	668,042	650,186
31	Lakshadweep	57,341	29,391	27,950
32	Kerala	–	–	–
33	Tamil Nadu	65,244,137	32,616,520	32,627,617
34	Puducherry	1,116,854	545,553	571,301
35	Andaman and Nicobar Islands	340,447	182,236	158,211
–	Total (India)	1,051,404,135	540,772,113	510,632,022

== Religion ==
Based on the latest Census Data

Population of India by Religion (2011 Census)
1. Hindus (79.8%)
2. Muslims (14.2%)
3. Christians (2.31%)
4. Sikhs (1.72%)
5. Buddhists (0.69%)
6. Jains (0.37%)
7. Other Religions and Persuasions (0.66%)
8. Religion Not Stated (0.24%)

Population pyramid by religion

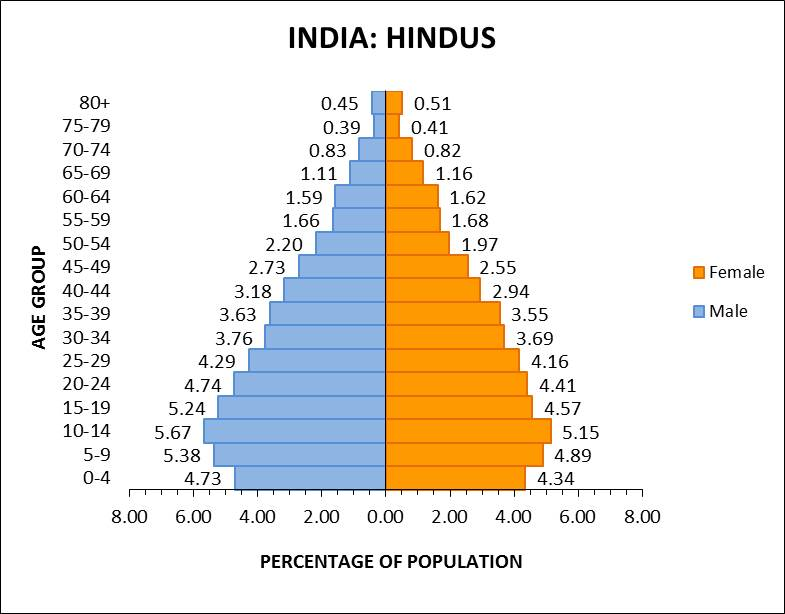
Hindu population pyramid in India based on the 2011 Census data. This chart visualizes the distribution of the Hindu population across various age groups in India.

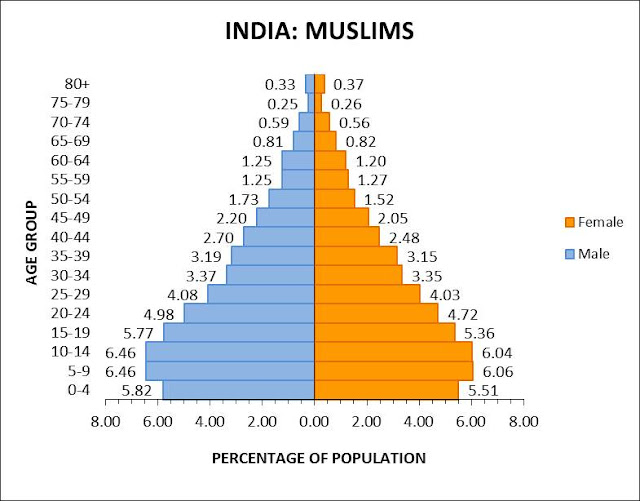
Muslim population pyramid in India based on the 2011 Census data. This chart visualizes the distribution of the Muslim population across various age groups in India.

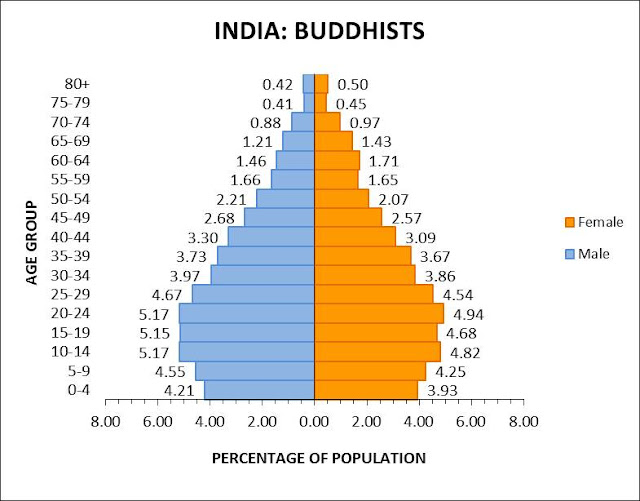
Buddhist population pyramid in India based on the 2011 Census data. This chart visualizes the distribution of the Buddhist population across various age groups in India.

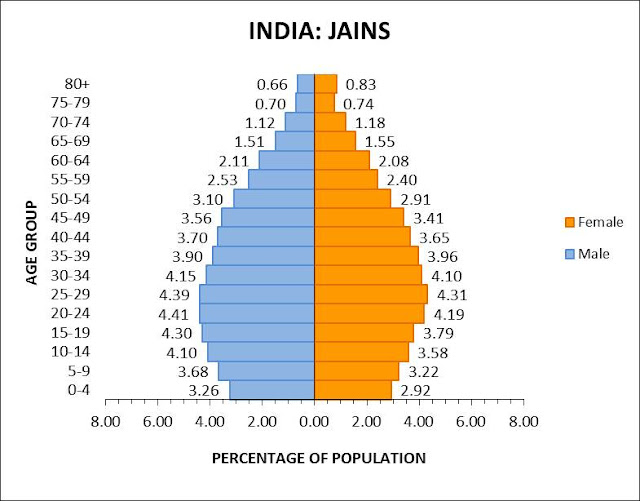
Jain population pyramid in India based on the 2011 Census data. This chart visualizes the distribution of the Jain population across various age groups in India.

The table below summarises India's demographics (excluding the Mao-Maram, Paomata and Purul subdivisions of Senapati district of Manipur state due to cancellation of census results) according to religion at the 2011 census in per cent. The data are "unadjusted" (without excluding Assam and Jammu and Kashmir); the 1981 census was not conducted in Assam and the 1991 census was not conducted in Jammu and Kashmir.

Religious populations' numbers (2011)
Religion	Population	Percentage (%)
Hindus	966,378,868	79.80%
Muslims	172,245,158	14.23%
Christians	27,819,588	2.30%
Sikhs	20,833,116	1.72%
Buddhists	8,442,972	0.70%
Jains	4,451,753	0.37%
Others	7,937,734	0.66%
Not Stated	2,867,303	0.24%

Changes in religious demographics over time
Year	Hindus	Muslims	Christians	Sikhs	Buddhists	Jainis	Zoroastrians	Others/ Religion not specified
1951	84.1%	9.8%	2.3%	1.79%	0.74%	0.46%	0.13%	0.43%
1961	83.45%	10.69%	2.44%	1.79%	0.74%	0.46%	0.09%	0.43%
1971	82.73%	11.21%	2.60%	1.89%	0.70%	0.48%	0.09%	0.41%
1981	82.30%	11.75%	2.44%	1.92%	0.70%	0.47%	0.09%	0.42%
1991	81.53%	12.61%	2.32%	1.94%	0.77%	0.40%	0.08%	0.44%
2001	80.46%	13.43%	2.34%	1.87%	0.77%	0.41%	0.06%	0.72%
2011	79.80%	14.23%	2.30%	1.72%	0.70%	0.37%	—N/a	0.9%

Characteristics of religious groups
Religious group	Population (2011) %	Growth (2001–2011)	Sex ratio (2011)				Literacy (2011) (%)	Work participation (2011) (%)
Religious group	Population (2011) %	Growth (2001–2011)	total	rural	urban	child	Literacy (2011) (%)	Work participation (2011) (%)
Hinduism	79.80%	16.8%	939	946	921	913	73.3%	41.0%
Islam	14.23%	24.6%	951	957	941	943	68.5%	32.6%
Christianity	2.30%	15.5%	1023	1008	1046	958	84.5%	41.9%
Sikhism	1.72%	8.4%	903	905	898	828	75.4%	36.3%
Buddhism	0.70%	6.1%	965	960	973	933	81.3%	43.1%
Jainism	0.37%	5.4%	954	935	959	889	94.9%	35.5%
Others/Religion Not Specified	0.90%	n/a	959	947	975	974	n/a	n/a

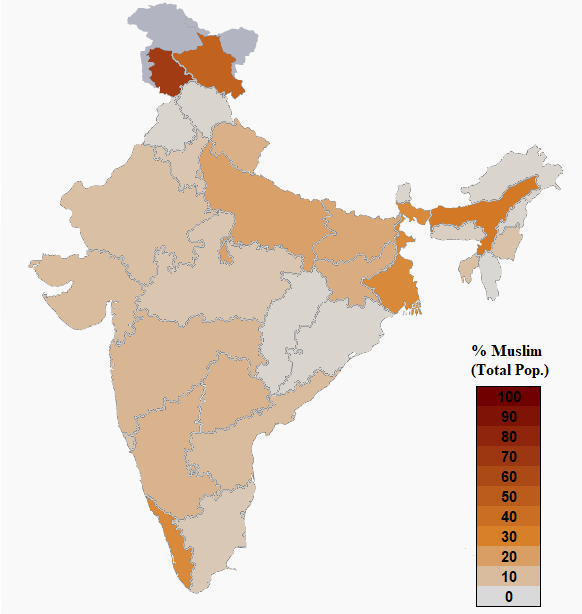
Percentage of total population of India's administrative divisions made up by Muslims (2011)

== Caste/tribe ==
Caste and community statistics as recorded from "Socially and Educationally Backward Classes Commission" (SEBC) or Mandal Commission of 1979, which was completed in 1983.

India has chosen not to officially count caste population since then.

The following data are from the Mandal report:

Caste/Tribe demographics (1983)
Caste/Tribe	Population	Percentage	Notes
Total population	731,000,000	100%	*Margin of error 0.34%
Scheduled castes and tribes	164,913,600	22.56%	
Scheduled castes	110,015,500	15.05%	
Scheduled tribes	54,898,100	7.51%	
Non OBC/SC/ST Hindu castes/communities	128,509,800	17.58%	
Brahmin (including Bhumihar)	40,351,200	5.52%	
Kshtriyas(Rajput)	28,509,000	3.90%	
Maratha	16,155,100	2.21%	
Jats	7,310,000	1%	
Vaishya, Bania, etc.	13,742,800	1.88%	
Kayasthas	7,821,700	1.07%	
Others [ Including Yadavs (Kshtriyas) ]	14,620,000	2%	
Non-Hindu communities and groups	121,346,000	16.6%	Non-Hindu scheduled and OBC
Muslim (Non S.T)	81,798,900	11.19%	0.02%
Christian (Non S.T)	15,789,600	2.16%	0.44%
Sikh (Non scheduled)	12,207,700	1.67%	0.22%
Buddhist (Non S.T)	4,897,700	0.67%	0.03%
Jain (Non scheduled)	3,435,700	0.47%	
Other backward classes and communities (OBC)	380,120,000	52%	*OBC is a derived figure
Hindu OBC	318,716,000	43.60%	
Non-Hindu OBC	61,404,000	8.40%	*52% of Non-Hindus

== Largest cities of India ==
Largest cities or towns in India 2011 census of India
Rank	Name	State/UT	Pop.	Rank	Name	State/UT	Pop.
1	Mumbai	Maharashtra	12,478,447	11	Kanpur	Uttar Pradesh	2,920,067
2	Delhi	Delhi	11,007,835	12	Lucknow	Uttar Pradesh	2,901,474
3	Chennai	Tamil Nadu	8,696,010	13	Nagpur	Maharashtra	2,405,421
4	Bengaluru	Karnataka	8,425,970	14	Indore	Madhya Pradesh	1,960,521
5	Hyderabad	Telangana	6,809,970	15	Thane	Maharashtra	1,818,872
6	Ahmedabad	Gujarat	5,570,585	16	Bhopal	Madhya Pradesh	1,795,648
7	Kolkata	West Bengal	4,486,679	17	Visakhapatnam	Andhra Pradesh	1,730,320
8	Surat	Gujarat	4,462,002	18	Pimpri-Chinchwad	Maharashtra	1,729,359
9	Pune	Maharashtra	3,115,431	19	Patna	Bihar	1,683,200
10	Jaipur	Rajasthan	3,073,350	20	Vadodara	Gujarat	1,670,806

== Charts ==
View source data.
View source data.
View source data.

== See also ==
- Culture of India
- Indian diaspora
- Immigration to India
- Religion in India
- Irreligion in India

=== Government ===
- Census of India
- National Commission on Population
- Caste census

=== Lists ===
- List of states and union territories of India by population
- List of states and union territories of India by fertility rate
- List of Indian states by life expectancy at birth
- List of cities in India by population
- List of metropolitan areas in India
- List of million-plus urban agglomerations in India

== Bibliography ==
- Arnold, David. Pandemic India: From Cholera to COVID-19 (Oxford University Press, 2022). Venkatesh, Archana (January 2023). "Review of Arnold, David, Pandemic India: From Cholera to Covid-19". H-Net Reviews.
- Chakravorty, Swastika, Srinivas Goli, and Kuriath S. James. "Family demography in India: Emerging patterns and its challenges Archived 24 January 2023 at the Wayback Machine". Sage Open 11.2 (2021): doi:10.1177/2158244021100817.
- Chamie, Joseph; Mirkin, Barry (August 2017), "Busting at the seams: India is unprepared for a near future when it will be the world's most populous country", Quartz, archived from the original on 16 August 2017. Joseph Chamie is former director of the United Nations Population Division and Barry Mirkin is former chief of the Population Policy Section of the United Nations Population Division.
- Chandrasekhar, S., and Ajay Sharma. "Urbanization and spatial patterns of internal migration in India ". Spatial demography 3.2 (2015): 63–89.
- Sekher, T. V. "Rural demography of India". in International handbook of rural demography (Springer, Dordrecht, 2012) pp. 169–189.
- Smith, Robert D., and Mohandas K. Mallath. "History of the growing burden of cancer in India: from antiquity to the 21st century". Journal of Global Oncology 5 (2019): 1–15.

Medieval India

- Lal, K. S. (1978). Growth of Muslim population in medieval India (A.D. 1000–1800). Delhi, Research Publications.
- Lal, K. S. (1995). Growth of scheduled tribes and castes in medieval India. New Delhi: Aditya Prakashan.
