= National Commission on Population =

National Population Commission (राष्ट्रीय जनसंख्या आयोग) is a commission of the government of India.

It was established on 11 May 2000. It is chaired by the prime minister. Chief ministers of all states, ministers of the related central ministries, secretaries of the concerned departments, eminent physicians, demographers and the representatives of the civil society are members of the commission.

== Mandate ==
The commission has the mandate

- to review, monitor and give direction for implementation of the National Population Policy with the view to achieve the goals set in the Population Policy
- promote synergy between health, educational environmental and developmental programmes so as to hasten population stabilization
- promote inter sectoral coordination in planning and implementation of the programmes through different sectors and agencies in center and the states
- develop a vigorous peoples programme to support this national effort.

== See also ==
- Demographics of India
- Politics of India
- Human overpopulation
