= Rustom Faramroze Contractor =

Indian former military leader

Vice Admiral R. F. Contractor PVSM, AVSM, NM
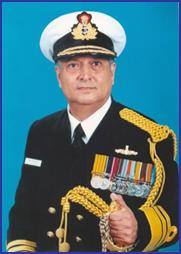
- Military career
- Allegiance: India
- Branch: Indian Navy; Indian Coast Guard
- Service years: 1971–2008
- Rank: Vice Admiral
- Nickname: Rusi
- Commands: Indian Coast Guard; Western Fleet; INS Viraat (R22); INS Ranvijay (D55); INS Rajput (D51); INS Sukanya (P50)
- Awards: Param Vishisht Seva Medal; Ati Vishisht Seva Medal; Nao Sena Medal

Vice Admiral Rustom Faramroze 'Rusi' Contractor, PVSM, AVSM, NM is a former flag officer in the Indian Navy. He last served as the 17th Director General of the Indian Coast Guard, from 2006 to 2008. He earlier served as the flag officer commanding Western Fleet and commanded the aircraft carrier INS Viraat (R22).

== Early life and education ==
Contractor was born in Nagpur. He completed his education at the St. Francis De'Sales High School. He subsequently joined the National Defence Academy, Khadakvasla in 1967.

== Naval career ==
Contractor was commissioned into the Indian Navy on 1 July 1971. After a few sea tenures, he opted to specialise in navigation and direction. In the late 1980s, the Navy started to acquire offshore patrol vessels from South Korea. Contractor was the commissioning commanding officer lead ship of the Sukanya-class patrol vessel, INS Sukanya (P50). He commissioned the vessel in South Korea on 31 August 1989 and brought her home to India. He attended the Naval higher command course (NHCC) at the College of Naval Warfare, Karanja.

Contractor served as the commanding officer INS Jarawa and naval officer-in-charge, Port Blair. He also commanded the Rajput-class guided-missile destroyers INS Rajput (D51) and INS Ranvijay (D55). In December 1997, he took over as the commanding officer of the naval base in Goa, INS Mandovi. He concurrently served as the commandant of Indian Naval Academy. The academy moved to its present location, Ezhimala, in 2008.

On 15 June 2000, Contractor took command of the aircraft carrier INS Viraat (R22). He was the 10th commanding officer of the carrier. He was in command of the carrier during the first International Fleet review in 2001 in Mumbai. He later served as the chief staff officer (operations) of the Eastern Naval Command. He also attended the Royal College of Defence Studies in London.

=== Flag rank ===
Contractor was promoted to acting rank of rear admiral and appointed assistant chief of naval staff - information warfare and operations (ACNS IW&O). This appointment was that of an assistant principal staff officer at Naval HQ. He subsequently moved to Kochi as the chief of staff (COS), Southern Naval Command. On 26 January 2005, he was awarded the Ati Vishisht Seva Medal. After a year-long tenure as COS, he was appointed flag officer commanding Western Fleet (FOCWF). He was the FOCWF during the President's fleet review in 2006, flying his flag on INS Ranjit (D53).

Contractor took command of the Western Fleet from Rear Admiral Pratap Singh Byce on 11 May 2005. After a year-long stint as FOCWF, he relinquished command, handing over to Rear Admiral Anup Singh. He moved to NHQ as the assistant controller of carrier projects (ACCP).

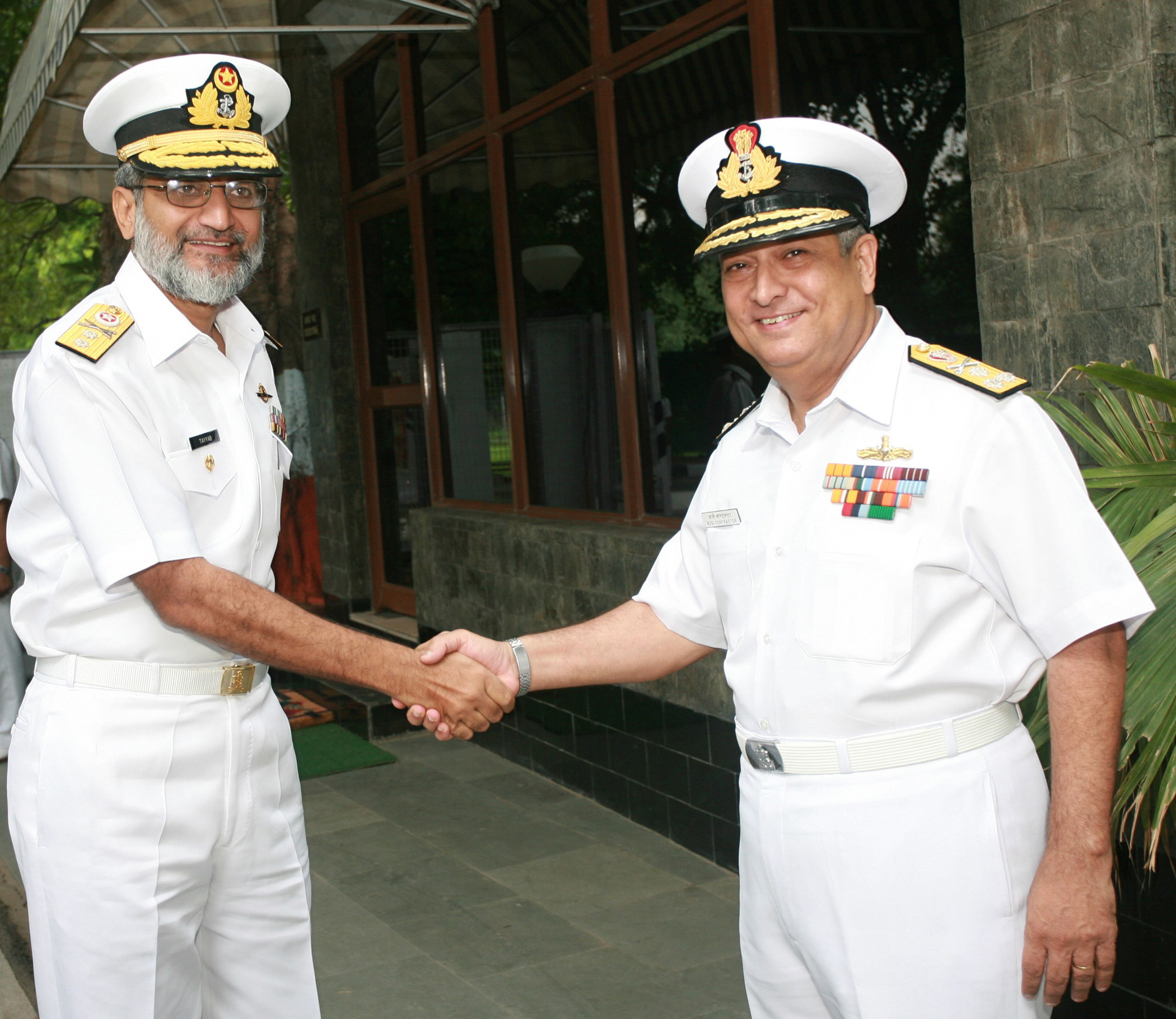
RAdm Tayyab Ali Dogar, DG Pakistan Maritime Security Agency calls on DGICG, VAdm Contractor (right).

=== DGICG ===
The Indian Coast Guard (ICG) came into being on 19 August 1978. The new service was to function under the overall command and control of a director general (DGICG). On 31 August 2006, Contractor was promoted to the rank of vice admiral and took over as the 17th director general of the Indian Coast Guard (DGICG), succeeding Director General Dr. P Paleri. During his tenure, the third Coast Guard air enclave (in Probandar) was commissioned. In 2007, he met with his Pakistani counterpart, the director general Pakistan Maritime Security Agency Rear Admiral Tayyab Ali Dogar to resolve issues regarding violation of the Exclusive Economic Zone (EEZ). The hotline between the two directors general was also established during his tenure.

He served as the DGICG over two-and-a-half years. He relinquished charge on 30 November 2008 to Vice Admiral Anil Chopra.

== Post-retirement ==
Contractor retired after 37 years of service on 30 November 2008. He was awarded the Param Vishisht Seva Medal on 26 January 2009 for his tenure as DGICG. In August 2009, the Armed Forces Tribunal was set up by an act of Parliament. Contractor was among the 15 administrative members of the tribunal, and was part of the Mumbai bench.

He is a freemason under the District Grand Lodge of Bombay.

== Awards and decorations ==

Param Vishisht Seva Medal	Ati Vishisht Seva Medal	Nao Sena Medal	Paschimi Star
Sangram Medal	Operation Vijay Medal	Operation Parakram Medal	Sainya Seva Medal
Videsh Seva Medal	50th Independence Anniversary Medal	25th Independence Anniversary Medal	30 Years Long Service Medal
	20 Years Long Service Medal	9 Years Long Service Medal	

Military offices
Preceded by N. Venugopal	Commandant of Indian Naval Academy; 1997-1999	Succeeded by Surinder Pal Singh Cheema
Preceded by S. K. Damle	Commanding officer INS Viraat; 2000-2001	Succeeded by Devendra Kumar Joshi
Preceded by Pratap Singh Byce	Flag Officer Commanding Western Fleet; 2005-2006	Succeeded by Anup Singh
Preceded by P. Paleri	Director General of the Indian Coast Guard; 2006–2008	Succeeded by Anil Chopra
