= NMSI (disambiguation) =

NMSI refers to the National Museum of Science and Industry, now Science Museum Group.

NMSI may also refer to:

- National mobile subscriber identity
- Order of Muleege Dynasty (NMSI)
