= Ahmed Naseem =

Maldivian politician (born 1948)

Ahmed Naseem NMSI
- އަޙްމަދު ނަސީމް
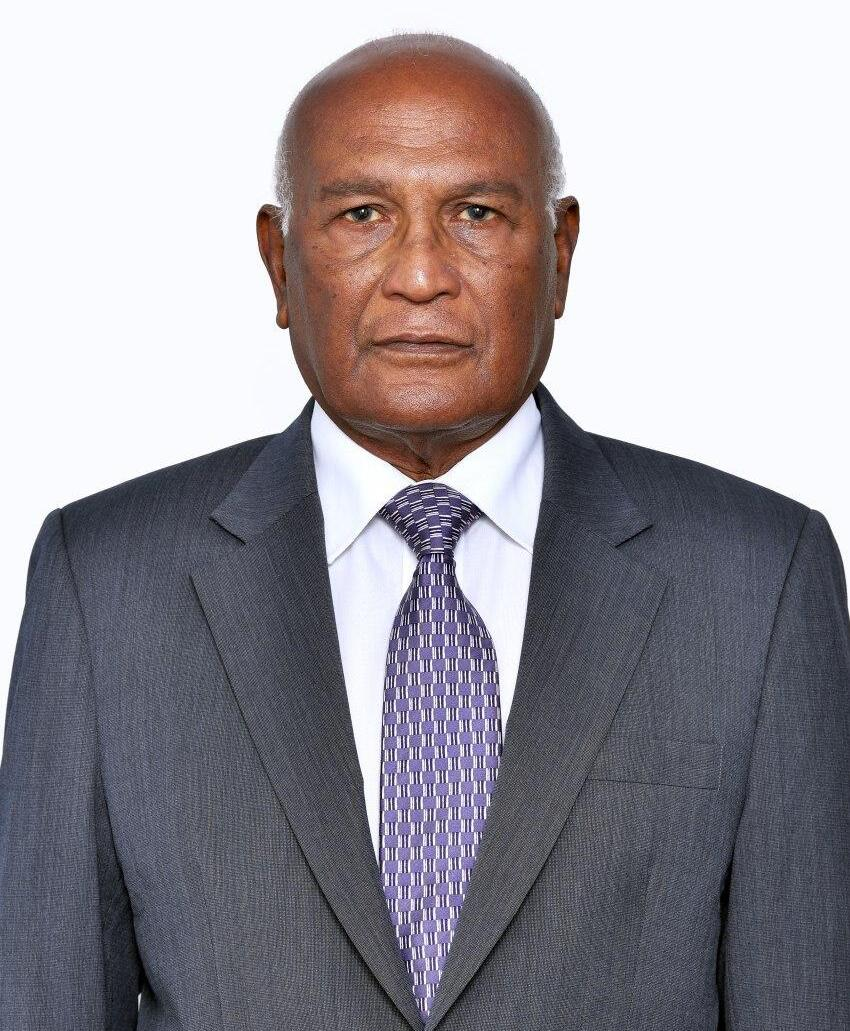
- Official portrait, 2022

Minister of Health
- In office 22 October 2020 – 17 November 2023
- President: Ibrahim Mohamed Solih
- Preceded by: Abdulla Ameen
- Succeeded by: Abdulla Khaleel

Minister of Foreign Affairs
- In office 21 March 2011 – 7 February 2012
- President: Mohamed Nasheed
- Preceded by: Mohamed Aslam
- Succeeded by: Abdul Samad Abdulla

Personal details
- Born: 13 July 1948 (age 77) Fura Malé, Maldive Islands
- Party: Democratic (2003–present)
- Spouse: Maumoona Haleem (m. 1972)
- Children: 4
- Parent: Kerafa Mohamed Kaleyfan (father)

Ahmed Naseem, NMSI (Dhivehi: އަޙްމަދު ނަސީމް; born 13 July 1948), often referred to as Kerafa Naseem, is a Maldivian politician and diplomat who served as the Minister of Health from October 2020 to November 2023, and Minister of Foreign Affairs from March 2011 to February 2012. He was a Minister at the President's Office from 2018 to 2020.

== Early life and family ==
Ahmed Naseem was born on 13 July 1948. (Note: See @AmnaShath (July 13, 2023). "Wishing you a very happy birthday Minister @KerafaNaseem. May you stay happy and healthy always. Lots of love and prayers" (Tweet) – via Twitter.) He was the son of Kerafa Mohamed Kaleyfan. Naseem married Maumoona Haleem in 1972; they have a son and two daughters.

== Career ==
=== Tourism ===
Naseem, after being educated in Sri Lanka, returned to the Maldives in 1968. Around the time, a foreign researcher submitted a journal to the Maldivian government, concluding that tourism development in the Maldives was unfeasible. The report cited a lack of motorized vessels, limited air transportation, inadequate water and electricity infrastructure, and the overall unsuitability of the Maldives for tourism. However, Naseem disagreed with the conclusions, believing that the researcher lacked understanding of the country's potential for tourism, which Naseem felt could only be fully recognized by the locals.

In 1969, Naseem joined the Maldivian Mission to the United Nations, returning to the Maldives in 1970. During a stop in Sri Lanka, Naseem met George Corbin, an Italian interested in exploring the Maldives for tourism opportunities. Corbin, one of the eventual pioneers of Maldivian tourism, believed in the future of tourism development in the country. The meeting between Naseem and Corbin led to discussions with Koli Mohamed Umar Manik, a close associate of Naseem, resulting in a plan to bring a group of tourists to the Maldives with Corbin's assistance.

Naseem recognized the importance of designating specific areas for tourism and the necessity of establishing a structured framework for its development. One of the significant challenges he faced was the limited flight availability to the Maldives. Air Ceylon, which operated flights to the Maldives at the time, had only a few services. In collaboration with air vice marshal Paddy Mendis of the Sri Lankan Air Force, Naseem arranged two chartered flights to bring the first group of tourists to the Maldives.

When tourism began in the Maldives, one of the challenges for Ahmed Naseem and his colleagues was convincing the Maldivian public that the industry could succeed. Despite initial skepticism, the gradual increase in tourist arrivals brought renewed optimism. Naseem later entered the tourism sector himself, managing several resorts. His approach was to start modestly, with plans for gradual development, while prioritizing the maintenance of high service standards.

== Minister of Foreign Affairs ==
=== Appointment ===
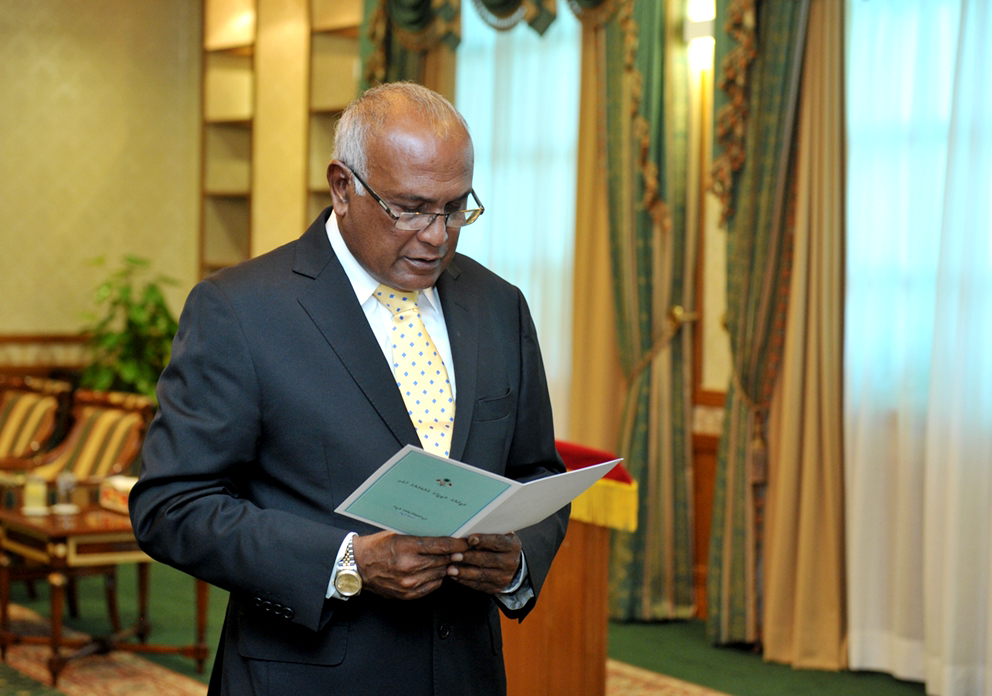
Naseem being sworn in as Foreign Minister

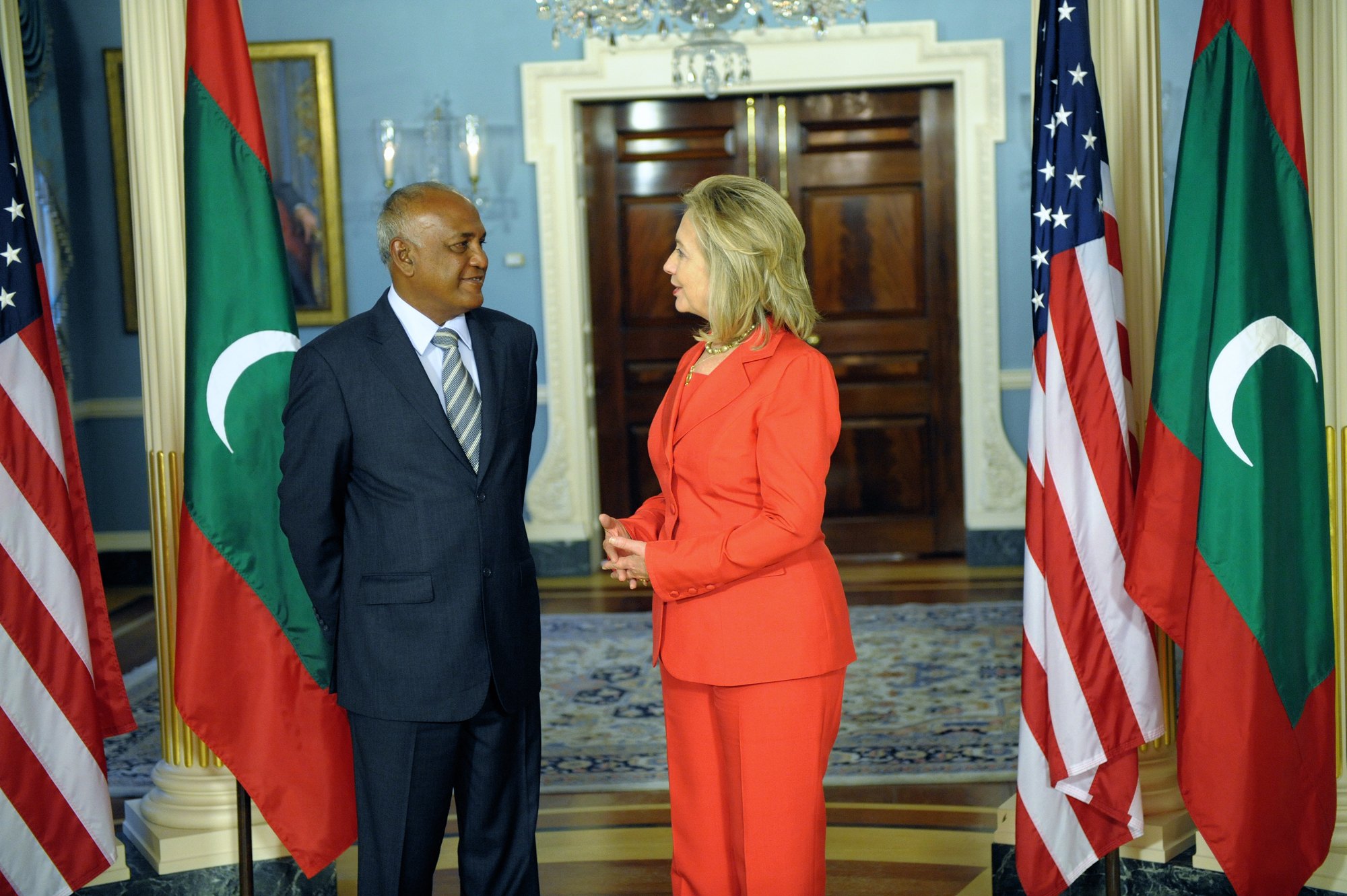
Naseem Meets with US Secretary of State, Hillary Clinton in 2011

Naseem, along with Attorney general Abdulla Muizzu, were sworn in on 21 March 2011; High court judge Yoosuf Hussain administered their oaths. After their appointment, president Mohamed Nasheed stated that

"I had utmost confidence in their ability to discharge their duties in their new posts".

On 27 March, Naseem's Name was sent to the People's Majlis for approval per Article 129(d) of the constitution. He was approved to serve as Minister of Foreign Affairs.

== Minister of Health ==
Naseem was appointed Minister of Health on 22 October 2020, following the resignation of Abdulla Ameen.
