= Asif Sandila =

Pakistan Navy admiral

Admiral Asif Sandila NI(M) HI(M) SI(M) LoM OM BJSN BYD NMSI
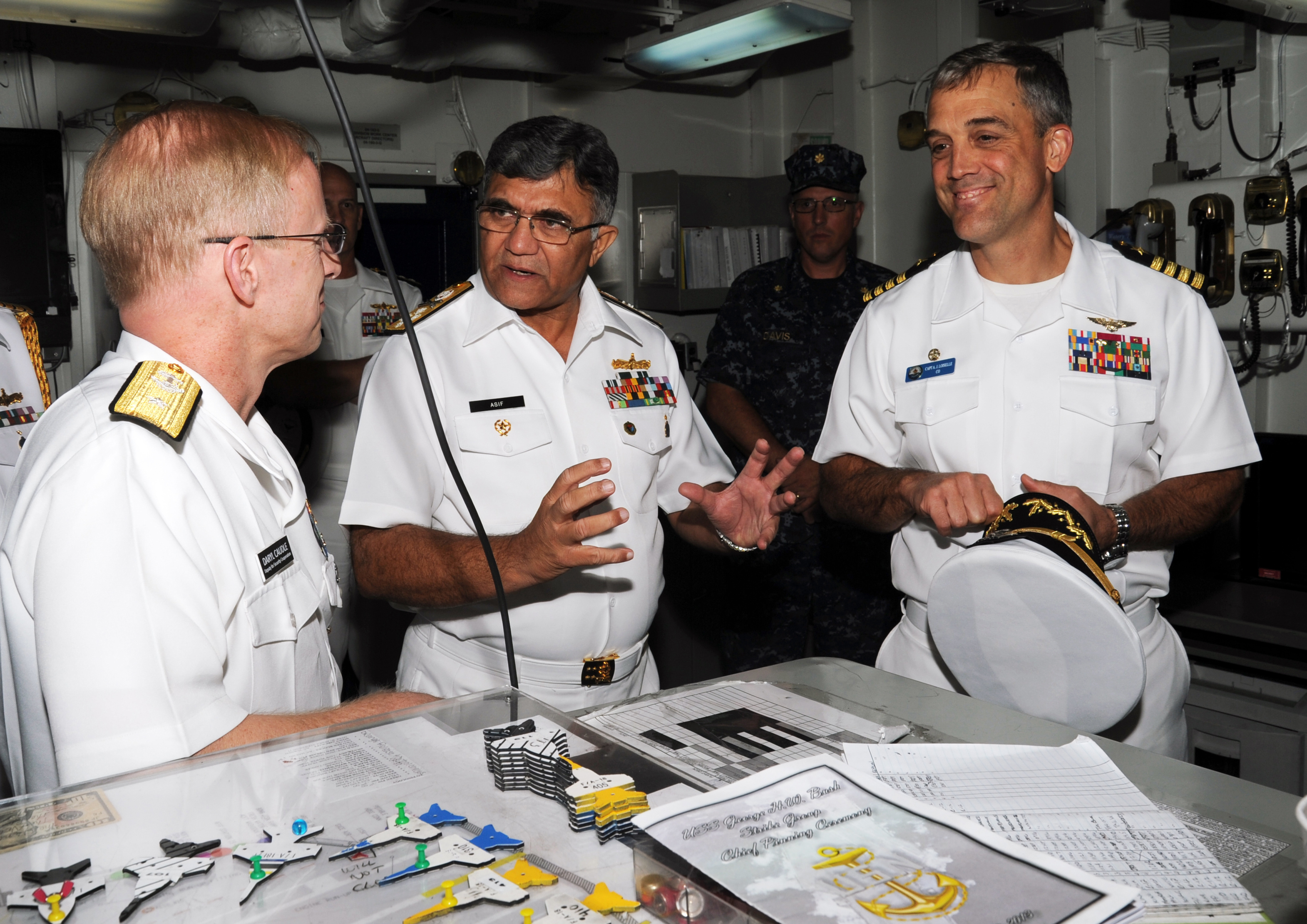
- Adm. Asif boarded on George H.W. Bush, an aircraft carrier, in 2013.

Chief of Naval Staff
- In office 3 October 2011 – 3 October 2014
- Preceded by: Adm. Noman Bashir
- Succeeded by: Adm. Muhammad Zakaullah

Personal details
- Born: Mohammad Asif Sandila; 1954 (age 71–72) Sangla Hill in Sheikhupura, Punjab, Pakistan
- Citizenship: Pakistan
- Education: Pakistan Naval Academy

Military service
- Allegiance: Pakistan
- Branch/service: Pakistan Navy
- Years of service: 1972–2014
- Rank: Admiral (PN No. 1795)
- Unit: Naval Operations Branch
- Commands: Vice Chief of Naval Staff; DCNS (Operations) at the Navy NHQ; DCNS (Projects) at the Navy NHQ; Commander Pakistan Fleet; Commander Logistics; DG Pakistan Maritime Security Agency; Pakistan Naval Observatory; OTC of 25th Destroyer Squadron
- Battles/wars: Indian Ocean earthquake in 2004; Indo-Pakistani standoff in 2008
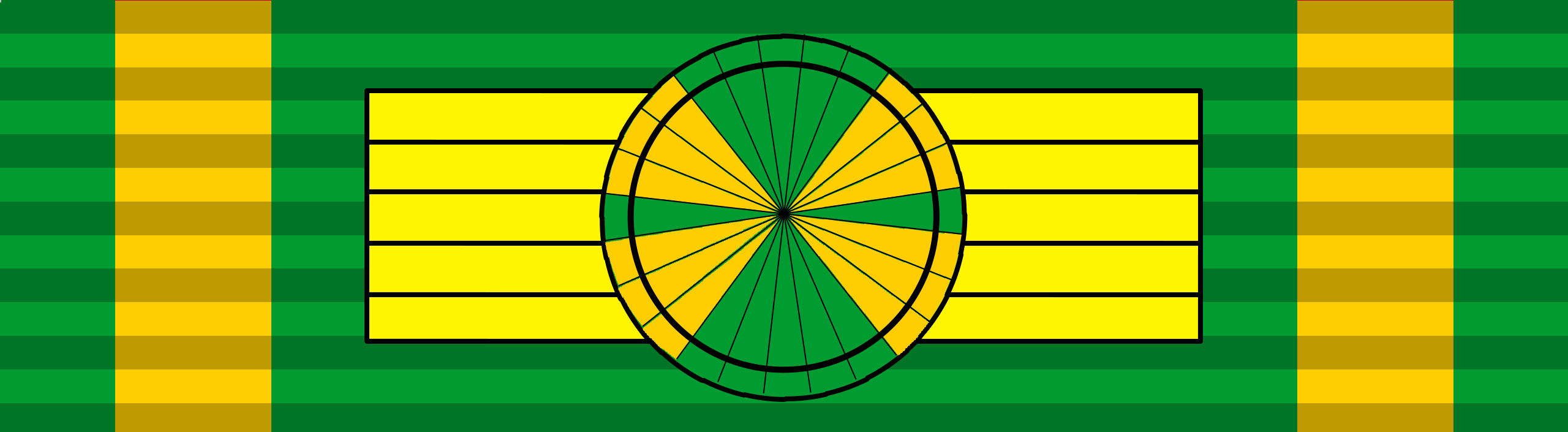
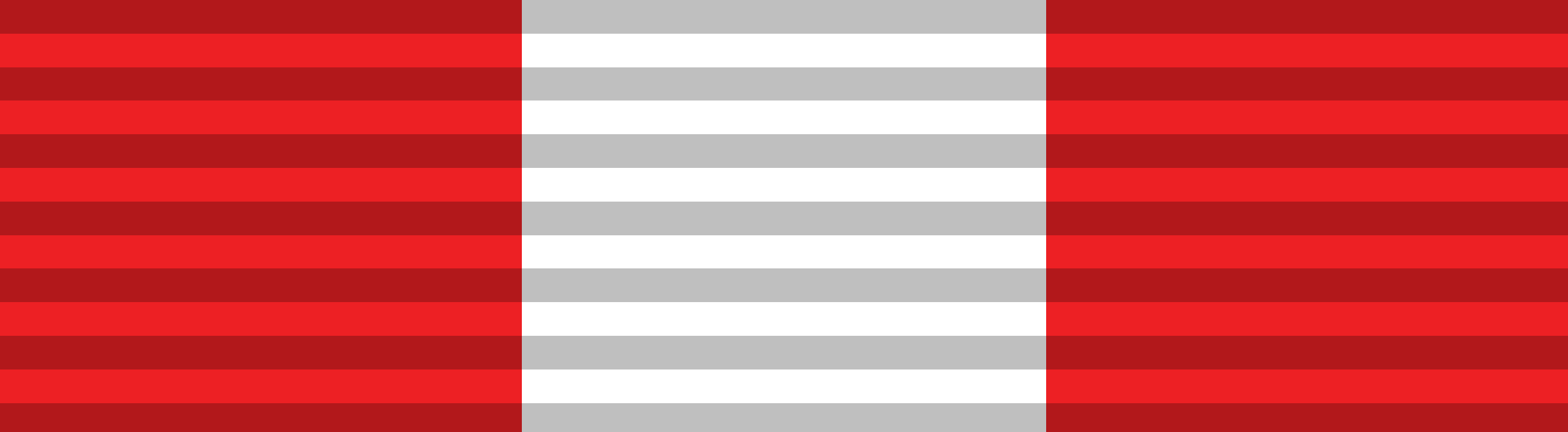
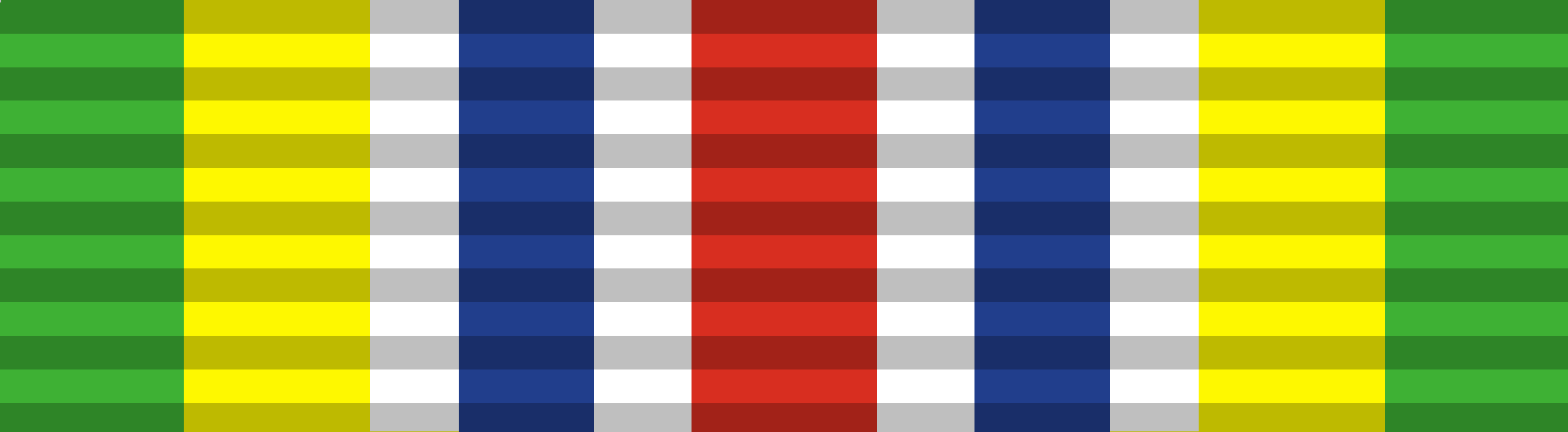
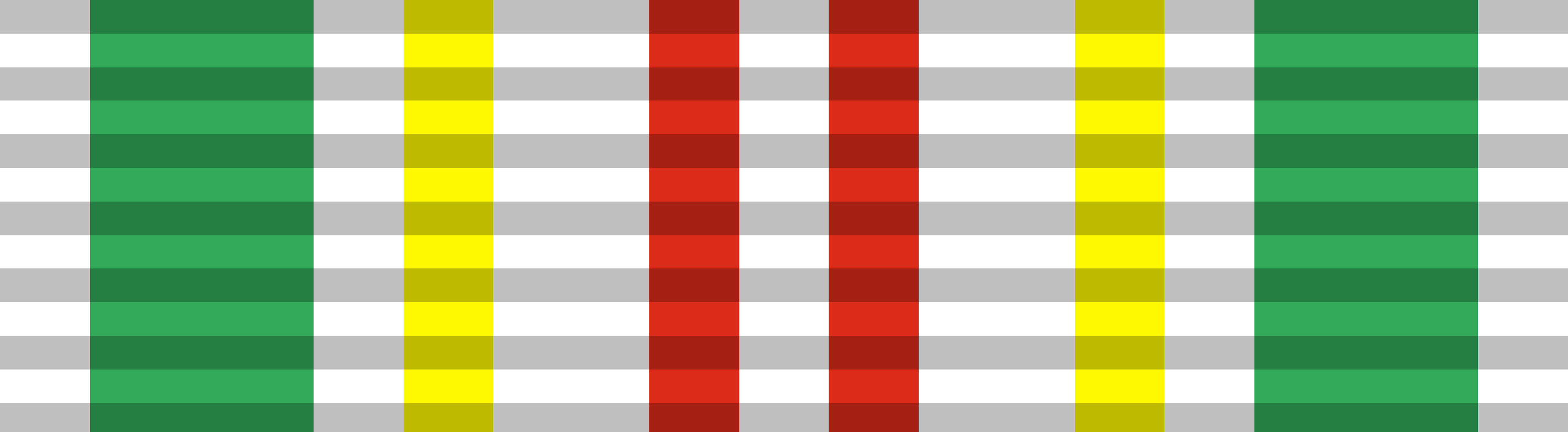
- Awards: Nishan-e-Imtiaz (Military) Hilal-e-Imtiaz (Military) Sitara-i-Imtiaz (Military) National Order of Merit Order of King Abdulaziz Turkish Legion of Merit Order of Muleege Dynasty Legion of Merit Bintang Jalasena Utama Yudha Dharma Utama

Mohammad Asif Sandila NI(M) HI(M) SI(M) LoM OM BJSN BYD NMSI (Urdu: محمد ﺁصف سندیلہ; born: 1954), is a retired four-star admiral in the Pakistan Navy who was the 19th Chief of Naval Staff of the Pakistan Navy. Prior to this command appointment, Sandila briefly tenured as the Vice Chief Naval Staff in the Pakistan Navy which he assumed in 2010.

In 2011, President Asif Ali Zardari, on the request of Prime Minister Yousaf Raza Gillani, promoted Sandila to four-star admiral and appointed him as the Chief of the Naval Staff on 7 October 2011 upon retirement of the then Chief of Naval Staff Admiral Noman Bashir.

== Biography ==
=== Early life and education ===
Asif Sandila was born into a Punjabi Jat family in a village at the Sangla Hill located in Sheikhupura District, Punjab in Pakistan in 1954.

After his matriculation from a local high school in 1967, Sandila went to attend Cadet College Kohat where he secured his FSc, and went to join the Pakistan Navy in 1972. He was selected to attend the Pakistan Naval Academy, initially focusing on mathematics, and was directed to attend the Britannia Royal Naval College in Dartmouth in the United Kingdom in 1974. In England, he was trained in navigation and qualified as a surface warfare officer in 1975.

Upon returning to Pakistan in 1975, he was gained commissioned as S-Lt. in the Naval Operations Branch, and was trained in anti-submarine operations on PNS Jehangir in 1976–77. S-Lt. Sandila was further trained in torpedo operations and navigation at the PNS Badr in 1977–79. He served on various surface warships as principle warfare officers throughout his career in the Navy.

He later attended, and is a graduate of the Naval War College in Lahore, and attended the staff course in Indonesian Navy's Naval Staff College. He later went to attend the National Defence University where he graduated with MSc in War studies.

== Career in the military ==
=== War and command appointments in the Pakistan Navy ===
After joining the Pakistan Navy as Midshipman in 1972, he served on the PNS Jahangir and PNS Badr as navigation and torpedo officer from 1977 until 1980. In 1985–88, Lt-Cdr. Sandila was affiliated with the Institute of Strategic Studies of the Quaid-i-Azam University in Islamabad, where he instruct courses on Strategic studies. He was later posted at the Pakistan Naval Academy in Karachi where he instruct courses on military navigation.

In 1988–91, Cdr. Sandila was taken to be serve as aide-de-camp to Adm. Iftikhar Ahmed Sirohey, the Chairman joint chiefs. In 1990s, Capt. Sandila later commanded Badr, a guided-missile destroyer, and did a tour of duty when he visited Middle East and the Europe.

In 2003–04, Cdre. Sandila took over the command of the 25th Destroyer Squadron as its officer in tactical command, and was leading the task force for overseeing the rescue operations from Maldives, where he was credited of rescuing more than 370 European tourists affected by the deadly underwater earthquake and tsunami in Indian Ocean in 2004.

In 2005, Cdre. Sandila commanded the mission through the Moawin and Tippu Sultan visiting on a bilateral missions in Mediterranean countries (Tunisia), Europe (France and the Britain), and later ending his voyage in United States (New York). In April 2005, Cdre. Sandila took participation in Mine hunter exercises with the French Navy, Royal Navy, and the U.S. Navy before reporting back to Pakistan.

In 2005, Cdre. Sandila was eventually promoted to two-star rank in the Navy, first serving as the Director-General of the Pakistan Maritime Security Agency (PMSA) until 2007, during which, he also served as the command of the Naval Observatory located in Jinnah Naval Base.

In 2007, R-Adm. Sandila was posted in the Navy NHQ in Islamabad as DCNS (Projects) and later as DCNS (Operations), for a brief time until being posted as senior fleet commander as Commander Pakistan Fleet (COMPAK) in 2008. During this time, R-Adm. Sandila was involved in operational deployment of navy's combatant commands at the Arabian Sea to deter any Indian Navy's attack on Pakistan, resulting during the military standoff in 2008. In 2009, R-Adm. Sandila was later posted in Navy NHQ in Islamabad as DCNS (Operations), for a brief time.

In 2009, R-Adm. Sandila was posted as Commander Logistics (COMLOG), where he was responsible for Navy's military logistics and engineering.

== Chief of Naval Staff ==
On 1 January 2010, R-Adm. Sandila was promoted to the three-star rank in the Navy while serving on the command assignment. In 2011, Vice-Admiral Sandila was later appointed as Vice-Chief of Naval Staff (VNCS) under Adm. Noman Bashir.

At the time of the promotion to the four-star appointment in 2011, V-Adm. Sandila was in a race along with four senior admirals in the Navy, though V-Adm. Sandila was the most senior among all:

  - Vice-Admiral Asif Sandila., Vice-Chief of Naval Staff (VCNS) at the Navy NHQ in Islamabad.
  - Vice-Admiral Tanveer Faiz. DCNS (Projects) at the Navy NHQ in Islamabad.
  - Vice-Admiral Abbas Raza. Senior commander in Karachi coast as Commander Karachi (COMKAR)
  - Vice-Admiral T. A. Dogar. Senior commander in Karachi as commander Naval Air Defence Command

On 6 October 2011, Farahnaz Ispahani, the presidential spokesperson, confirmed that the President Zardari has approved the promotion paper and promoted V-Adm. Sandila as four-star admiral in the Navy, taking the command of the Navy from Adm. Numan as its Chief of Naval Staff on 8 October 2011. His 4 star promotion became headline news in the country with much media speculation on the nature of his assignment. The change of command ceremony was held at Naval Headquarters, Islamabad. Admiral Sandila received the guard of honor prior to the assuming the navy's command. Under his command, the Navy focused towards the seaborne operations involved with the CTF-150 and the CTF-151.

In 2014, the Government of Pakistan confirmed his retirement from the 42-year military service, and after retiring from the Navy after, Adm. Sandila went to established the Moawin Foundation, an organization focused toward promoting the literacy and building schools all over the country.

Upon his retirement, he handed over the command of the Navy to Admiral Muhammed Zakaullah.

== Awards and decorations ==

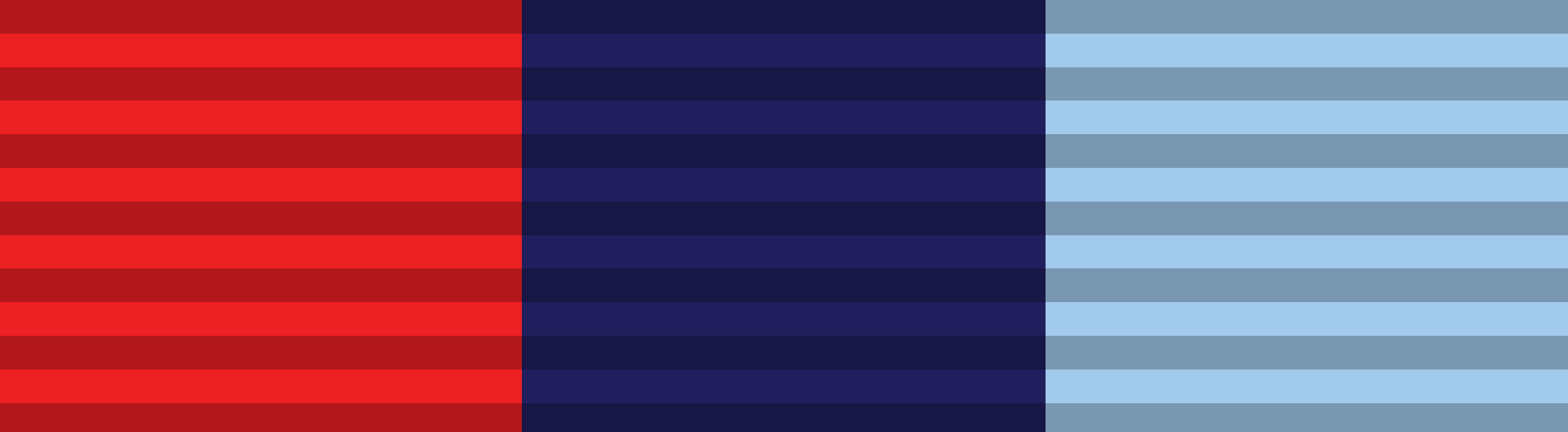

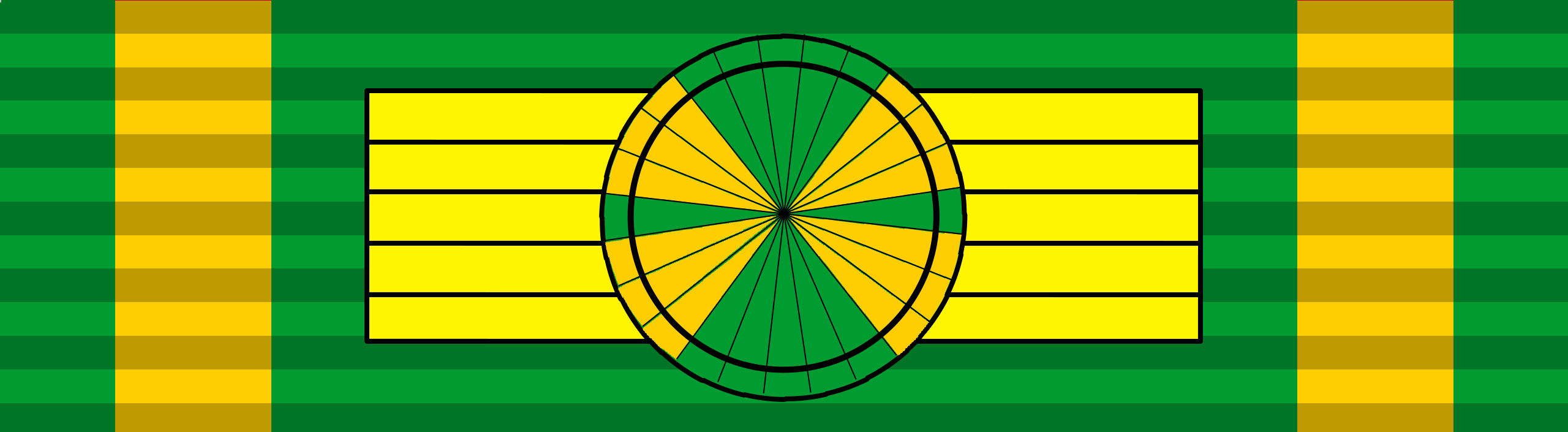

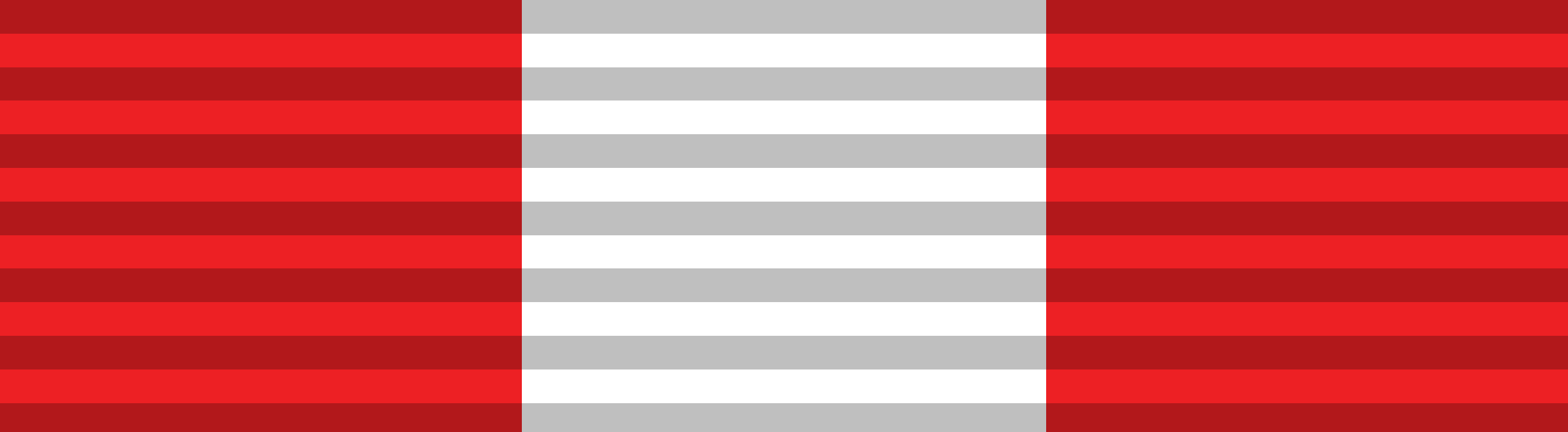

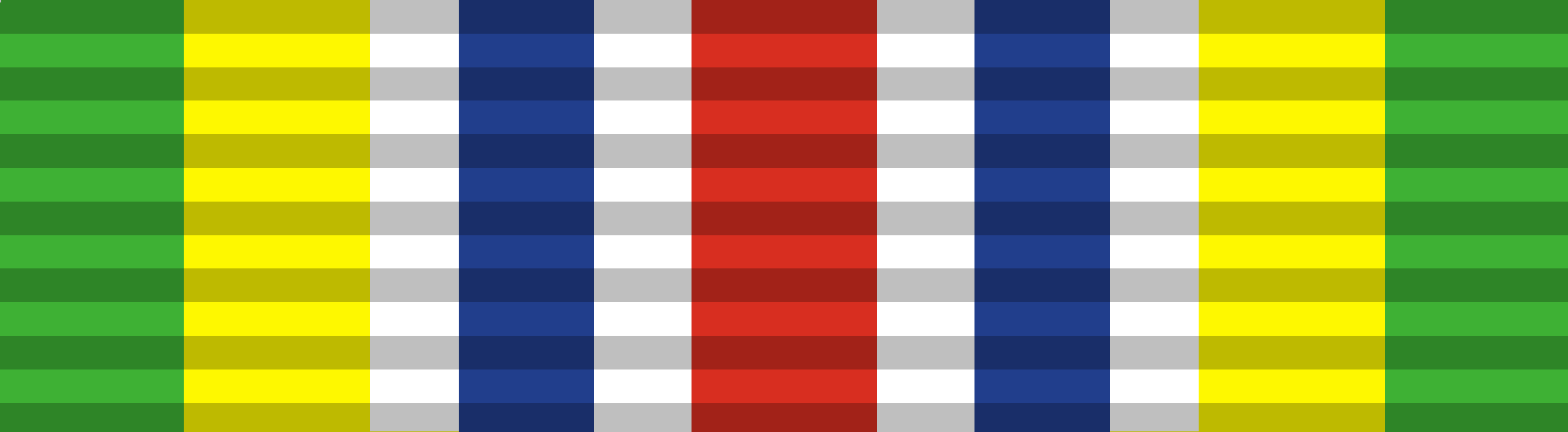

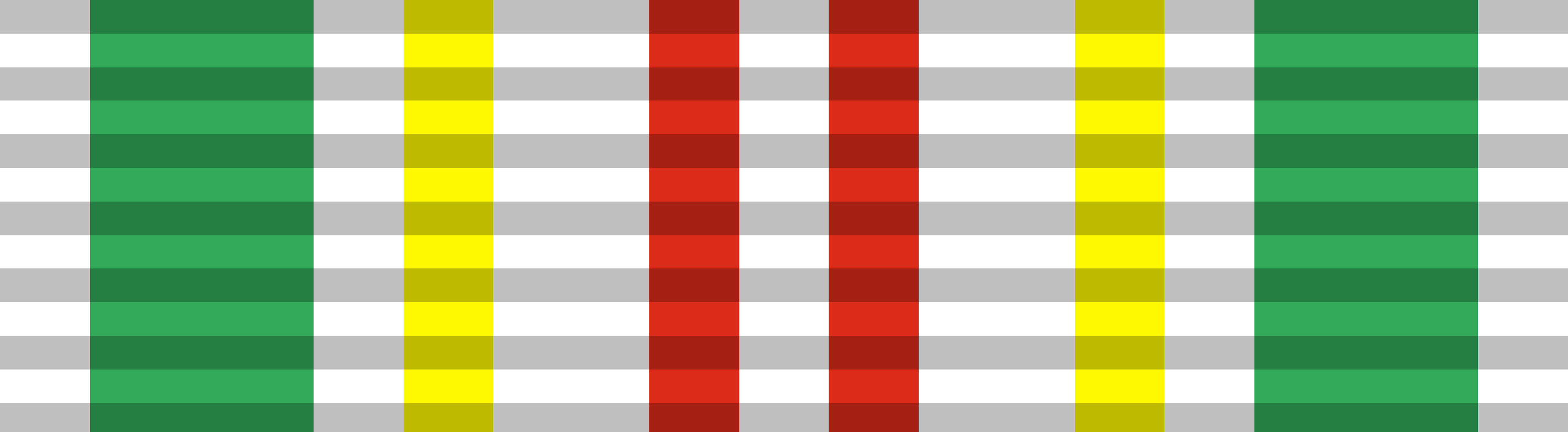

Pakistan Navy Operations Branch Badge
Command at Sea insignia
Nishan-e-Imtiaz (Military) (Order of Excellence)		Hilal-e-Imtiaz (Military) (Crescent of Excellence)	
Sitara-e-Imtiaz (Military) (Star of Excellence)	Tamgha-e-Baqa (Nuclear Test Medal) 1998	Tamgha-e-Istaqlal Pakistan (Escalation with India Medal) 2002	10 Years Service Medal
20 Years Service Medal	30 Years Service Medal	35 Years Service Medal	40 Years Service Medal
Tamgha-e-Sad Saala Jashan-e- Wiladat-e-Quaid-e-Azam (100th Birth Anniversary of Muhammad Ali Jinnah) 1976	Hijri Tamgha (Hijri Medal) 1979	Jamhuriat Tamgha (Democracy Medal) 1988	Qarardad-e-Pakistan Tamgha (Resolution Day Golden Jubilee Medal) 1990
Tamgha-e-Salgirah Pakistan (Independence Day Golden Jubilee Medal) 1997	National Order of Merit (Knight) (France)	Order of King Abdul Aziz (1st Class) (Saudi Arabia) 2017	Turkish Legion of Merit (Turkey)
Order of Muleege Dynasty (Maldives) 2013	The Legion of Merit (Degree of Commander) (USA)	Bintang Jalasena Utama (Indonesia) 2014	Bintang Yudha Dharma Utama (Indonesia) 2014

=== Foreign Decorations ===
Foreign Awards
France	National Order of Merit - Knight (Chevalier)
Saudi Arabia	Order of King Abdul Aziz (1st Class)
Turkey	Turkish Legion of Merit
Maldives	Order of Muleege Dynasty
USA	The Legion of Merit (Degree of Commander)
Indonesia	Bintang Jalasena Utama
Indonesia	Bintang Yudha Dharma Utama

== See also ==
- Pakistan Army
- Appointment preferences for Army for appointment of Chairman Joint Chiefs of Staff Committee

Military offices
Preceded by ADM Noman Bashir	Chief of Naval Staff; 7 October 2011 – 1 October 2014	Succeeded by ADM Muhammad Zakaullah
Preceded by VADM Shahid Iqbal	Vice Chief of the Naval Staff; 10 August 2010 – 6 October 2011	Succeeded by VADM Tayyab Ali Dogar
