= Tayyab Ali Dogar =

Pakistani vice admiral (1955–2019)

Vice Admiral Tayyab Ali Dogar HI(M) SI(M) SBt TI(M)
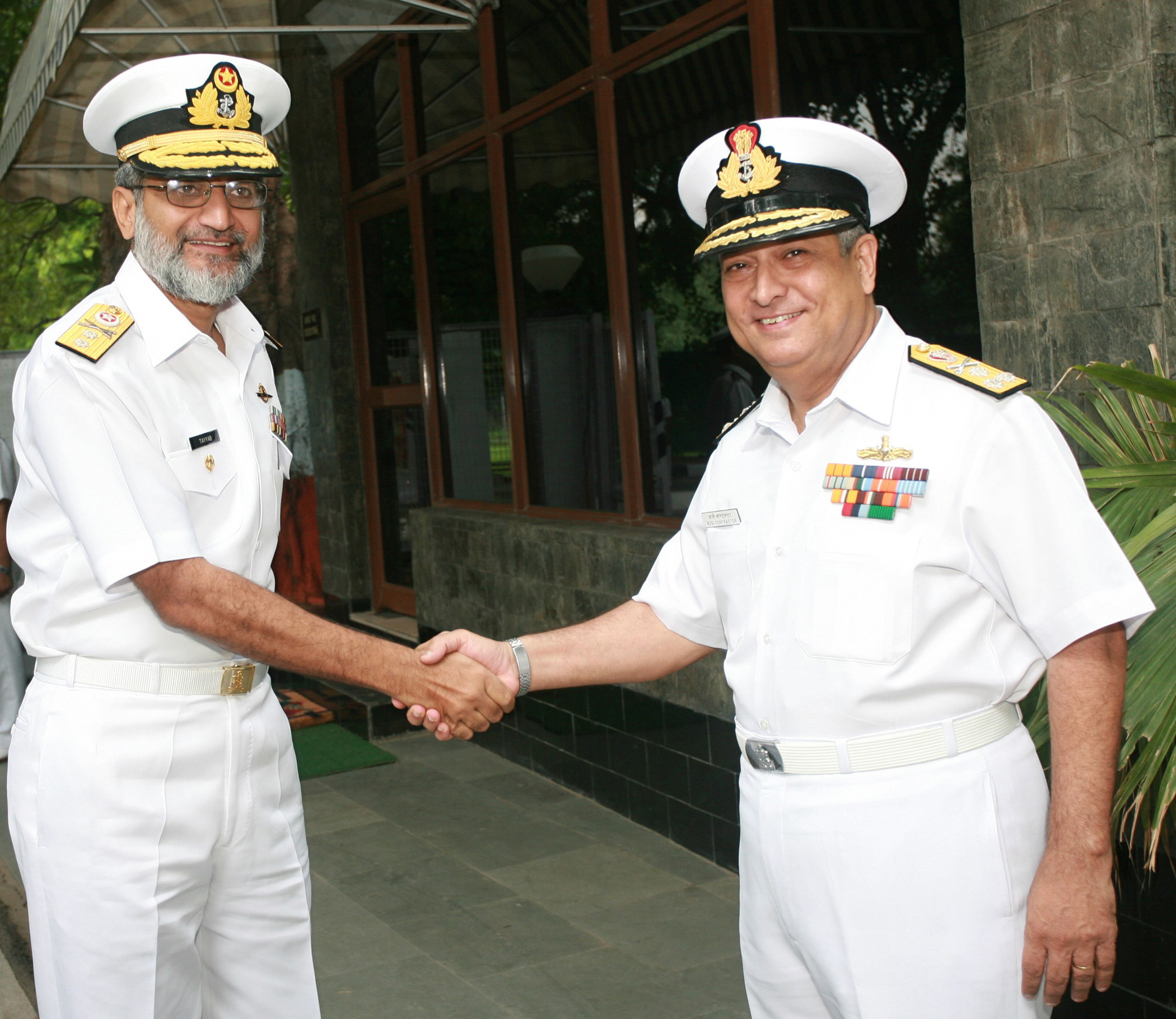
- RAdm Tayyab Ali Dogar (left) with the DGICG VAdm R. F. Contractor
- Born: Tayyab; 14 July 1955; Multan, Pakistan
- Died: 13 March 2019 (aged 63); Lahore, Pakistan
- Burial place: Army Graveyard Cavalry Ground Lahore
- Relatives: Yusuf Ali, Vice Admiral (Retd.) Mahmood Ali, Brig. (Retd.) Yasub Ali Dogar, Col. (Retd) Shuaib Ali, Ayub Ali Dogar
- Military career
- Allegiance: Pakistan
- Branch: Pakistan Navy
- Service years: 1974–2012
- Rank: Vice Admiral
- Unit: Naval Operations Branch
- Commands: Vice-Chief of Naval Staff; Naval Air Defence Command; Commander Karachi (COMKAR); Commander Coastal Areas; Maritime Security Agency; Flag Officer Sea Training; OC Pakistan Marines
- Conflicts: Indo-Pakistani wars and conflicts; Indo-Pakistani standoff in 2001; Indo-Pakistani standoff in 2008; Indo-Pakistani maritime trespassing; War in North-West Pakistan; Operation Madad; Operation Rah-e-Nijat; Operation Mehran; War in Afghanistan
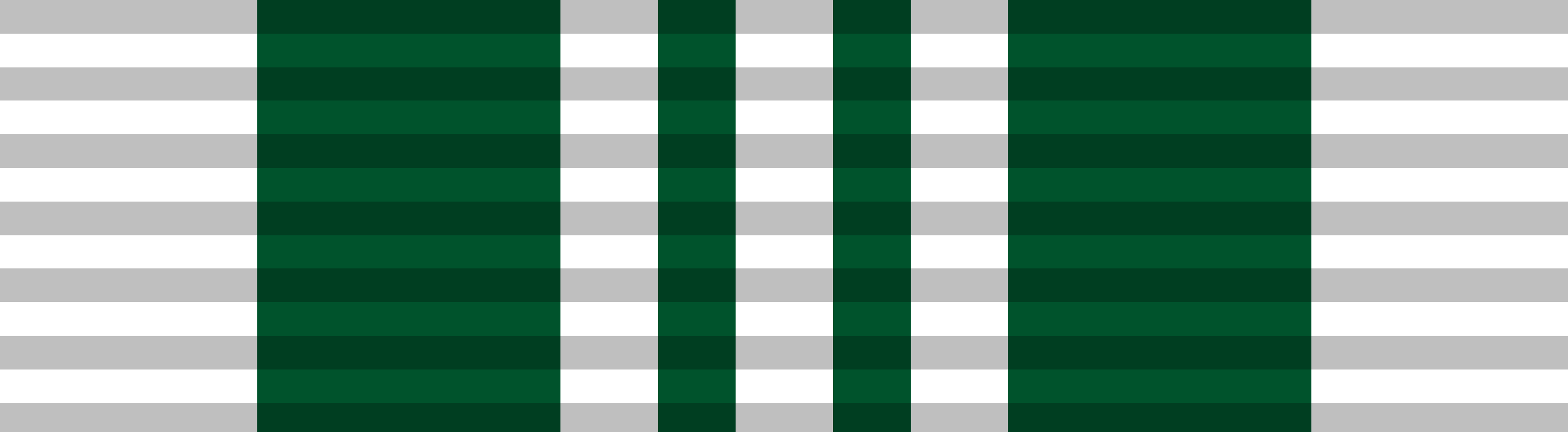
- Awards: Hilal-e-Imtiaz (Military) Sitara-e-Imtiaz (Military) Sitara-e-Basalat Tamgha-e-Imtiaz (Military)

Tayyab Ali Dogar HI(M) SI(M) SBt TI(M) (Urdu: طيب على ڈوگر) was a Pakistani vice admiral in the Pakistan Navy.

== Biography ==
Dogar was educated at the Cadet College Hasan Abdal, and joined the Pakistan Navy on 15 December 1973, gaining commissioned in the Navy in June 1976 as Sub-Lieutenant in the Naval Operations Branch. He was further educated at the Defence Services Command and Staff College in Dhaka, and later graduated with MSc in Defence studies from the National Defence University (NDU) in Islamabad.

Dogar completed his specialization in Torpedo and Anti-Submarine Warfare (Long TAS) and served in the Submarine Command as the Director Submarine Operations and ACNS (Submarine acquisition) at the Navy NHQ.

In the 1990s, Cdr. Dogar commanded the two Hangor-class submarine before commanding the squadron as a one-star admiral in 2005. In 2007, Cdre. Dogar was elevated on a two-star rank, and was appointed as the Director-General of the Maritime Security Agency (MSA), the coast guard, which he led the agency until 2008. During this time, he held talks with the Director General of the Indian Coast Guard Vice Admiral R. F. Contractor to resolve issues involving the military activities in Sir Creek area.

In 2009, R-Adm. Tayyab Ali Dogar was posted as the Flag Officer Sea Training (FOST), which is an appointment that required the admiral to oversee and supervise all kinds of seaborne training in the Navy. During this time, he was involved in operational deployment of the Pakistan Marines at the Sir Creek region after the military standoff between India and Pakistan.

In 2010, Rear Admiral Tayyab Ali Dogar took over the command of the Pakistan Coastline as the Commander Coastal Area (COMCOAST), and was later promoted on the three-star rank in the Navy. In 2010, V-Adm. Dogar oversaw the massive relief efforts involving the units of Naval aviation, Marine Corps, and the Army, during the great floods took place in Pakistan. Vice-Admiral Dogar was the first commander of the Naval Air Defence Command, where he oversaw the induction of new weapon systems used by the Pakistan Marines.

In 2011, Vice Admiral Tayyab Ali Dogar was in the race for the promotion to the four-star appointment:

  - Vice-Admiral Asif Sandila, Vice-Chief of Naval Staff (VCNS) at the Navy NHQ in Islamabad.
  - Vice-Admiral Tanveer Faiz. DCNS (Projects) at the Navy NHQ in Islamabad.
  - Vice-Admiral Abbas Raza. Senior commander in Karachi coast as Commander Karachi (COMKAR)
  - Vice-Admiral Tayyab Ali Dogar. Senior commander in Karachi as Naval Air Defence.

In 2011, Vice Admiral Tayyab Ali Dogar was posted as the Vice-Chief of Naval Staff under Admiral Asif Sandila which he served till his retirement on 13 July 2012.

After retiring from the Navy in 2013, Dogar accepted the presiding position at the Navy League, a lobbying firm, which he continued to serve till his death.

== Death ==
Tayyab Ali Dogar died on Tuesday 13 March 2019 in CMH Lahore due to cardiac arrest. He is survived by his wife, Amna Tayyab and his two children, Dua Batul Tayyab and Ibrahim Tayyab Dogar.

== Awards and decorations ==

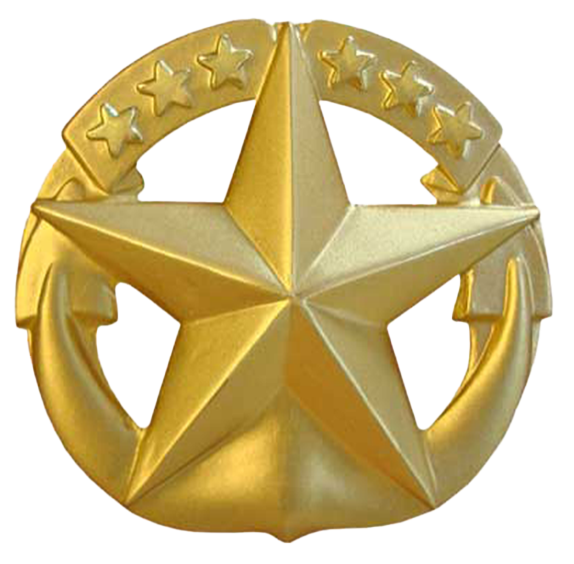

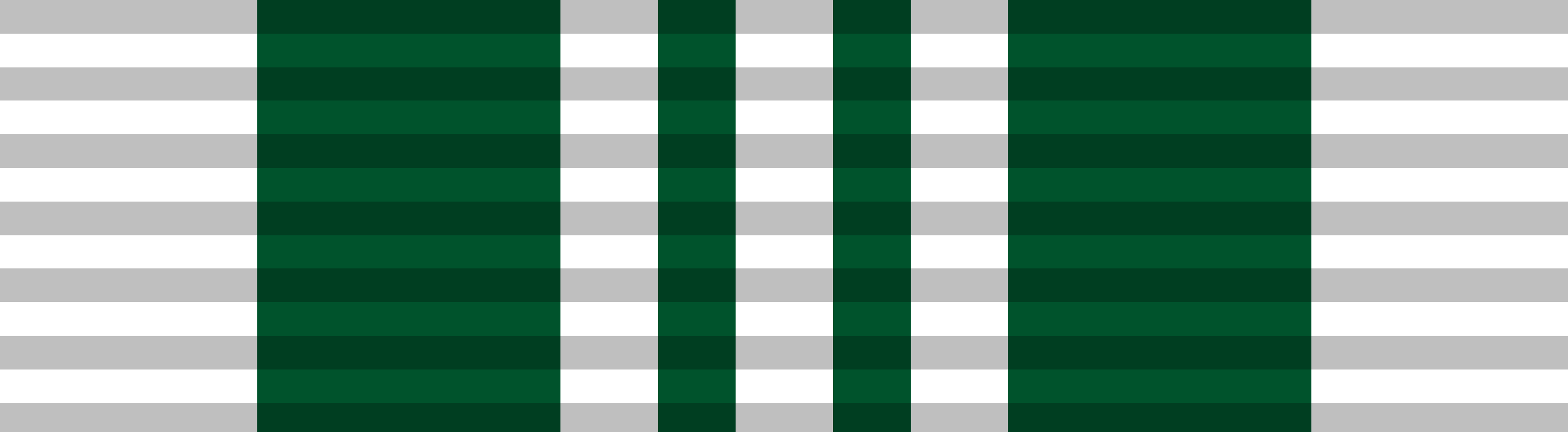

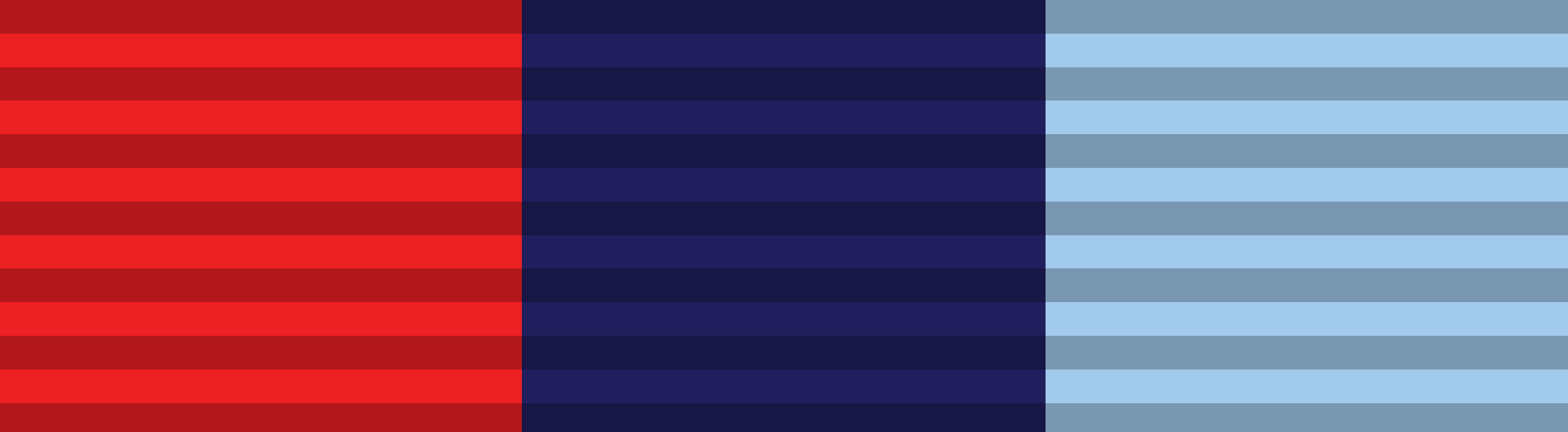

Pakistan Navy Operations Branch Badge
Submarine insignia
Hilal-e-Imtiaz (Military) (Crescent of Excellence)	Sitara-e-Imtiaz (Military) (Star of Excellence)	Sitara-e-Basalat (Star of Good Conduct)	Tamgha-e-Imtiaz (Military) (Medal of Excellence)
Tamgha-e-Baqa (Nuclear Test Medal) 1998	Tamgha-e-Istaqlal Pakistan (Escalation with India Medal) 2002	10 Years Service Medal	20 Years Service Medal
30 Years Service Medal	35 Years Service Medal	40 Years Service Medal	Tamgha-e-Sad Saala Jashan-e- Wiladat-e-Quaid-e-Azam (100th Birth Anniversary of Muhammad Ali Jinnah) 1976
Hijri Tamgha (Hijri Medal) 1979	Jamhuriat Tamgha (Democracy Medal) 1988	Qarardad-e-Pakistan Tamgha (Resolution Day Golden Jubilee Medal) 1990	Tamgha-e-Salgirah Pakistan (Independence Day Golden Jubilee Medal) 1997

Military offices
Preceded by VADM Asif Sandila	Vice Chief of the Naval Staff; 7 October 2011 – 2012	Succeeded by VADM ?
