= Pradeep Chauhan =

Vice Admiral Pradeep Chauhan AVSM, VSM
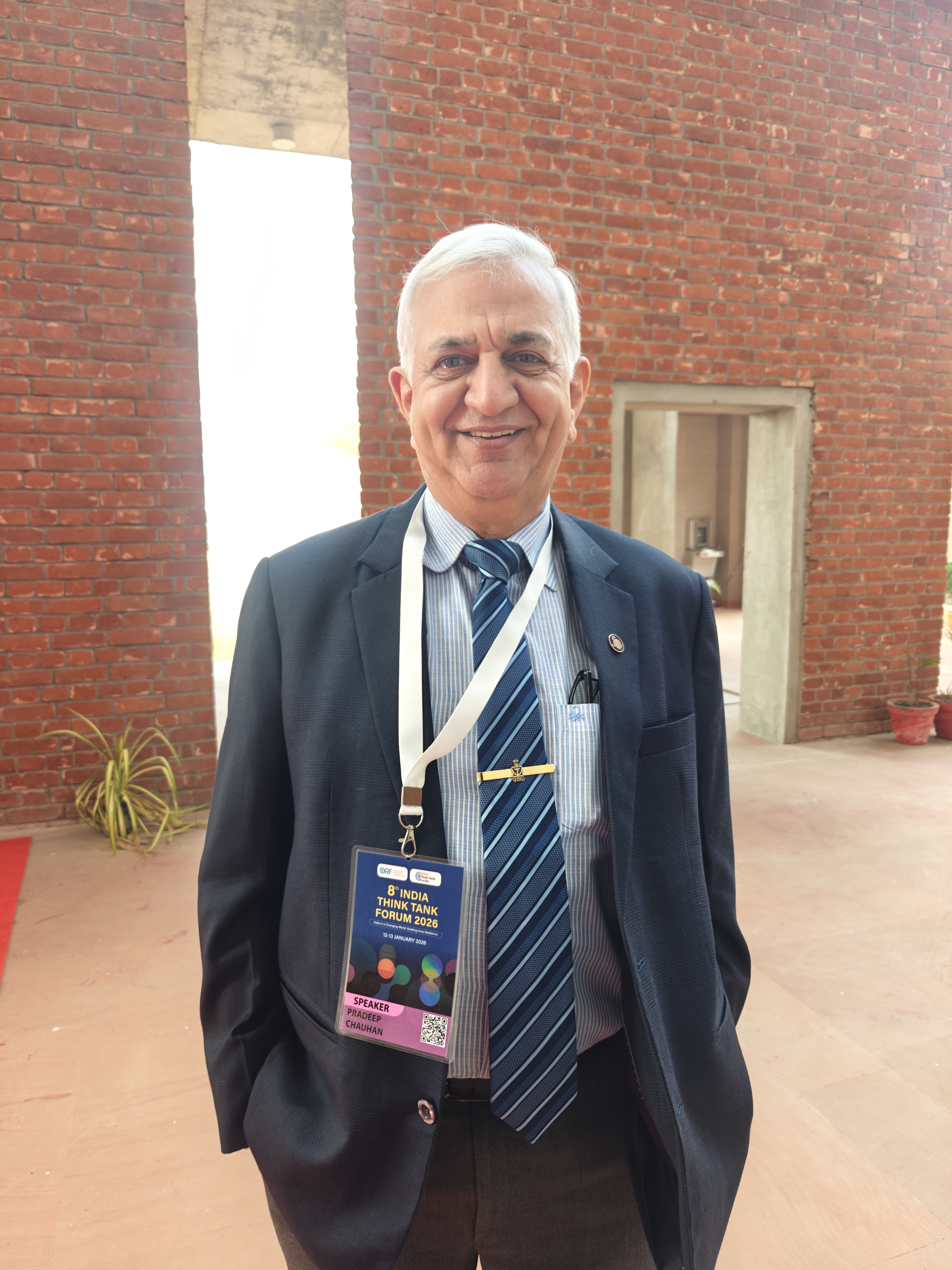
- Vice Admiral Pradeep Chauhan (retd), at the India Think Tank Forum 2026.
- Military career
- Allegiance: India
- Branch: Indian Navy
- Rank: Vice Admiral
- Commands: Indian Naval Academy; INS Viraat (R22); INS Brahmaputra (F31); Mauritius Coast Guard
- Awards: Ati Vishisht Seva Medal; Vishisht Seva Medal

Vice Admiral Pradeep Chauhan, AVSM, VSM is a former Flag Officer in the Indian Navy. He last served as the Commandant of Indian Naval Academy at Ezhimala. His previous posting was as the Assistant Chief of Naval Staff, Foreign Cooperation, Strategic Threats and Transformation

== Career ==
He is an alumnus of India's National Defence Academy, Pune, the Defence Services Staff College at Wellington, the Naval War College, Mumbai and the National Defence College, New Delhi.

Chauhan has over 35 years of rich and varied experience in the Indian Navy. In his seagoing career, he has been singularly privileged to have held command of the Indian Navy's frontline surface-combatants on four occasions. He has been instrumental in the conceptualisation and proving of tactics-of-war for the Indian Navy and has been the principal director in the Directorate of Naval Operations at Naval Headquarters, New Delhi. A navigation and direction specialist, he commanded the aircraft carrier INS Viraat. He was also part of the ‘Fourth Indian Scientific Expedition to Antarctica. Shore postings include, among others, heading the Naval Training Team at the Defence Services Staff College, and principal director naval operations at Naval Headquarters.

Adm Chauhan was appointed as the first assistant chief of naval staff (foreign cooperation and intelligence).

he was promoted as a rear admiral in 2005, and he was promoted to the rank of vice admiral in 2009 and took over as the chief of staff of the Western Naval Command in August 2009. He is a recipient of the Vishisht Seva Medal and the Ati Vishisht Seva Medal.

== Post-retirement ==
Currently, Vice Admiral Pradeep Chauhan is the Director General of the National Maritime Foundation, New Delhi, which is India’s foremost resource centre for the development and advocacy of strategies for the promotion and protection of India’s maritime interests.

Military offices
Preceded by Anurag G Thapliyal	Commandant, Indian Naval Academy; February 2012 - November 2013	Succeeded by Ajit Kumar P
Preceded by Anil Chopra	Commanding officer INS Viraat; January 2004 - May 2005	Succeeded by Surinder Pal Singh Cheema
