= Anil Chopra (admiral) =

Indian navy flag officer

Vice Admiral Anil Chopra PVSM, AVSM
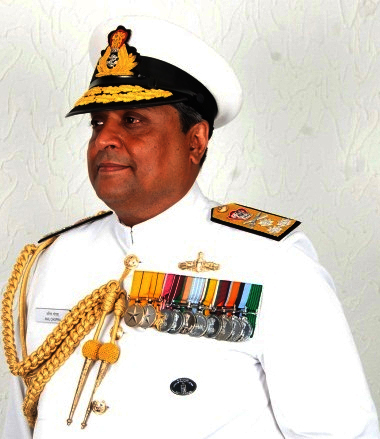
- Military career
- Allegiance: India
- Branch: Indian Navy; Indian Coast Guard
- Rank: Vice Admiral
- Commands: Western Naval Command; Eastern Naval Command; Western Fleet; INS Viraat; INS Rajput (D51); INS Kuthar (P46)

Vice Admiral Anil Chopra, PVSM, AVSM is a retired Indian Navy Flag officer, who served as Flag Officer Commanding-in-Chief Western Naval Command from 2014 to 2015.

He previously served as Flag Officer Commanding-in-Chief Eastern Naval Command from 1 November 2011, after having served as Director General Indian Coast Guard from 2008.

== Naval career ==
He joined the Indian Navy on July 1, 1975. and commanded the corvette INS Kuthar (1993–94), the destroyer INS Rajput (2000-2001) and the aircraft carrier, INS Viraat (2003-2004).

He was awarded the Ati Vishisht Seva Medal in 2007.

== Awards and decorations ==

Param Vishisht Seva Medal	Ati Vishisht Seva Medal	Paschimi Star	Sangram Medal
Operation Parakram Medal	Videsh Seva Medal	50th Anniversary of Independence Medal	25th Anniversary of Independence Medal
30 Years Long Service Medal	20 Years Long Service Medal		9 Years Long Service Medal

Military offices
Preceded by Shekhar Sinha	Flag Officer Commanding-in-Chief, Western Naval Command; 2014-2015	Succeeded by Surinder Pal Singh Cheema
Preceded by Anup Singh	Flag Officer Commanding-in-Chief, Eastern Naval Command; 2011-2014	Succeeded by Satish Soni
Preceded by R. F. Contractor	Director General of the Indian Coast Guard; 2008 - 2011	Succeeded by M. P. Muralidharan
Preceded by Shekhar Sinha	Flag officer commanding Western Fleet; 24 January 2008 - 27 November 2008	Succeeded by Surinder Pal Singh Cheema
Preceded by Devendra Kumar Joshi	Commanding officer INS Viraat; 7 January 2003 - 6 January 2004	Succeeded by Pradeep Chauhan
