= Order of Muleege Dynasty =

National honour in the Maldives

Order of the Dignified Rule of Muleege Dynasty

Awarded by Maldives
- Type: Order
- Established: 2011
- Awarded for: Service for the government or the Maldives
- Status: Currently constituted
- Grades: Collar
- Post-nominals: NMSI

Precedence
- Next (higher): Order of Izzuddin
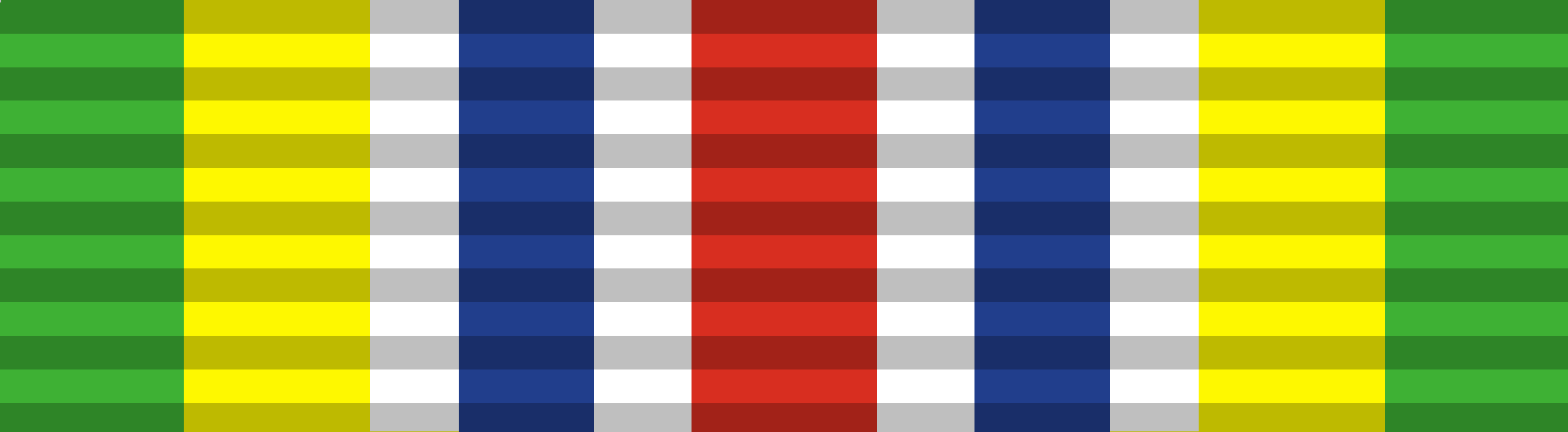
- Ribbon bar

The Order of the Dignified Rule of Muleege Dynasty (also known as the Order of Distinguished Rule of Muleege or Nishaan Muleege Sharafge Izzaiy) is a national honour in the Maldives and the highest award that can be bestowed upon a civilian.

== History ==
This award commemorates the rule of Sultan Muhammad Shamsuddeen III.

== Recipients ==
Recipient	Date	Ref
Mohamed Umar Manik	2011	
Ahmed Shafeeg	2011	
Qasim Ibrahim	26 July 2013	
Champaa Hussain Afeef	26 July 2013	
Champaa Mohamed Moosa	26 July 2013	
Mohamed Asif Sandila	10 October 2013	
Bob N. Harilela	10 November 2013	
Mahmoud Fatah Ali Abdulla Al Khajeh	15 January 2015	
Ibrahim Ismail Ali	26 December 2020	
Ahmed Naseem	20 October 2022	
Sultan bin Abdulrahman Al-Murshid	14 April 2025	
