= Surinder Pal Singh Cheema =

Indian Navy admiral

Vice Admiral S P S Cheema PVSM, AVSM, NM
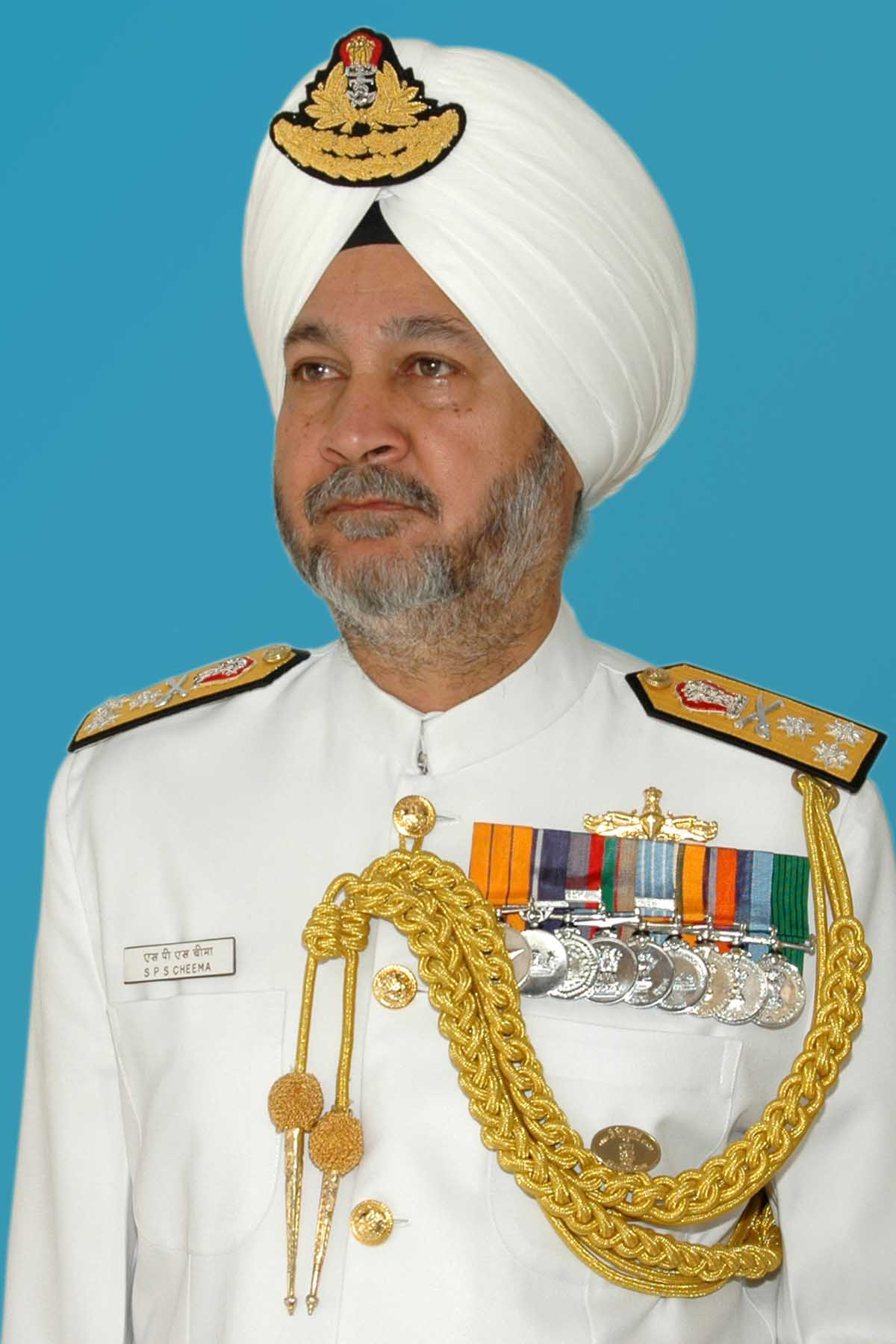
- Military career
- Allegiance: India
- Branch: Indian Navy
- Service years: January 1977 – January 2016
- Rank: Vice admiral
- Commands: Western Naval Command; Southern Naval Command; Strategic Forces Command; Integrated Defence Staff; Western Fleet; Indian Naval Academy; INS Viraat; INS Trishul; INS Khanjar; INS Nishank
- Awards: Param Vishist Seva Medal; Ati Vishist Seva Medal; Nausena Medal

Vice Admiral Surinder Pal Singh Cheema PVSM, AVSM, NM is a former flag officer in the Indian Navy. He last served as flag officer commanding-in-chief of the Western and Southern Naval Commands. He also served as the Commander-in-Chief, Strategic Forces Command and the Chief of Integrated Defence Staff to the chairman of the Chiefs of Staff Committee. He retired from the service on 31 January 2016, after almost four decades of service.

== Early life and education ==
Cheema attended the Sainik School, Kunjpura. He then graduated from the National Defence Academy, Khadakwasla and was commissioned into the Indian Navy on 1 January 1977.

== Military career ==
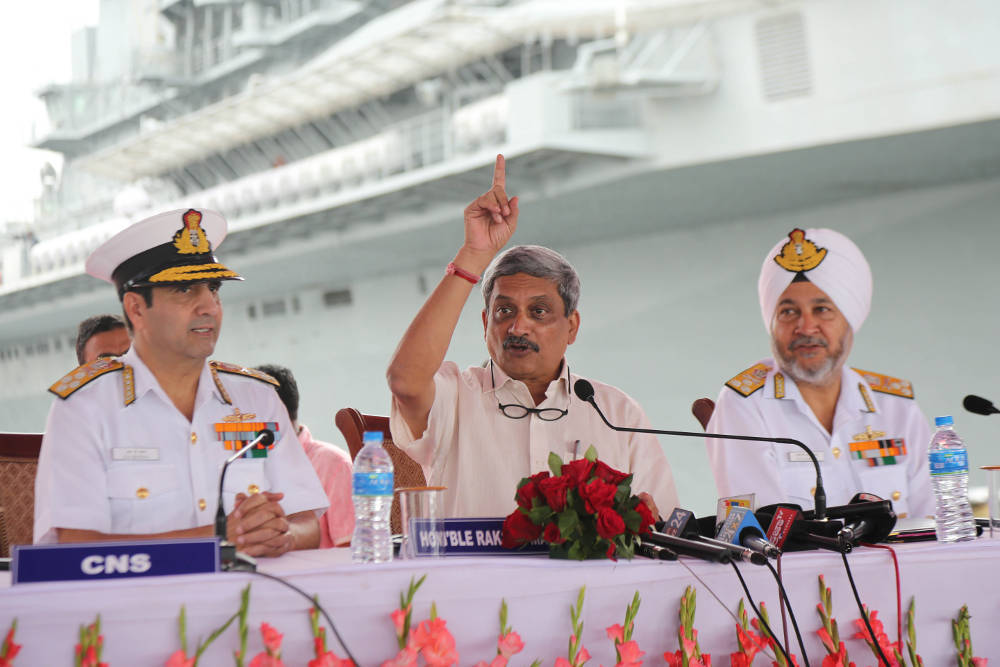
Vice Admiral SPS Cheema (right) with Defence Minister Manohar Parrikar (center) and CNS RK Dhowan during commissioning of INS Vajrakosh

Cheema is a missile and gunnery specialist. He was the commissioning commanding officer of the Missile boat INS Nishank and commanded the Khukri class missile corvette INS Khanjar. He also commissioned the Talwar class stealth frigate INS Trishul as the commanding officer. He served as the 14th commanding officer of the Centaur class aircraft carrier INS Viraat. Ashore, he commanded the naval base INS Mandovi in Goa.

He attended the Defence Services Staff College (DSSC), Wellington where he was awarded the Lentaigne and Scudder Medals (for best dissertation and being "first in overall order of merit"). He also attended the College of Naval Warfare (CNW), Mumbai.

=== Flag Rank ===
As a rear admiral, Cheema commanded the Western Fleet from 2008 to 2009. In his staff appointments, he served as the Controller of Personnel Services at the Integrated Headquarters. He served as the Deputy Chief of Integrated Defence Staff (DCIDS) for Perspective Planning and Force Development (PP&FD) and for DOT in two different assignments. Apart from these, he served as the chief of staff of Western Naval Command.

After promotion to the rank of vice admiral, he served in four different appointments as a commander-in-chief since being promoted to C-in-C grade on 31 August 2012. He served as the chief of Integrated Defence Staff to the chairman of the Chiefs of Staff Committee from 31 August 2011 to 1 November 2012; Commander-in-Chief, Strategic Forces Command from 1 November 2012 to June 2014; FOC-in-C of Southern Naval Command from 2014 to 2015; and as lastly as the FOC-in-C of Western Naval Command from 1 April 2015 to 31 January 2016. He also served as the commandant of Indian Naval Academy. He retired on 31 January 2016, after four decades of service; Vice Admiral Sunil Lanba succeeded him as FOC-in-C of Western Naval Command.

== Awards and decorations ==

Param Vishisht Seva Medal	Ati Vishisht Seva Medal	Nausena Medal	Special Service Medal
Operation Parakram Medal	Videsh Seva Medal	50th Anniversary of Independence Medal	30 Years Long Service Medal
	20 Years Long Service Medal	9 Years Long Service Medal	

== Gallery ==
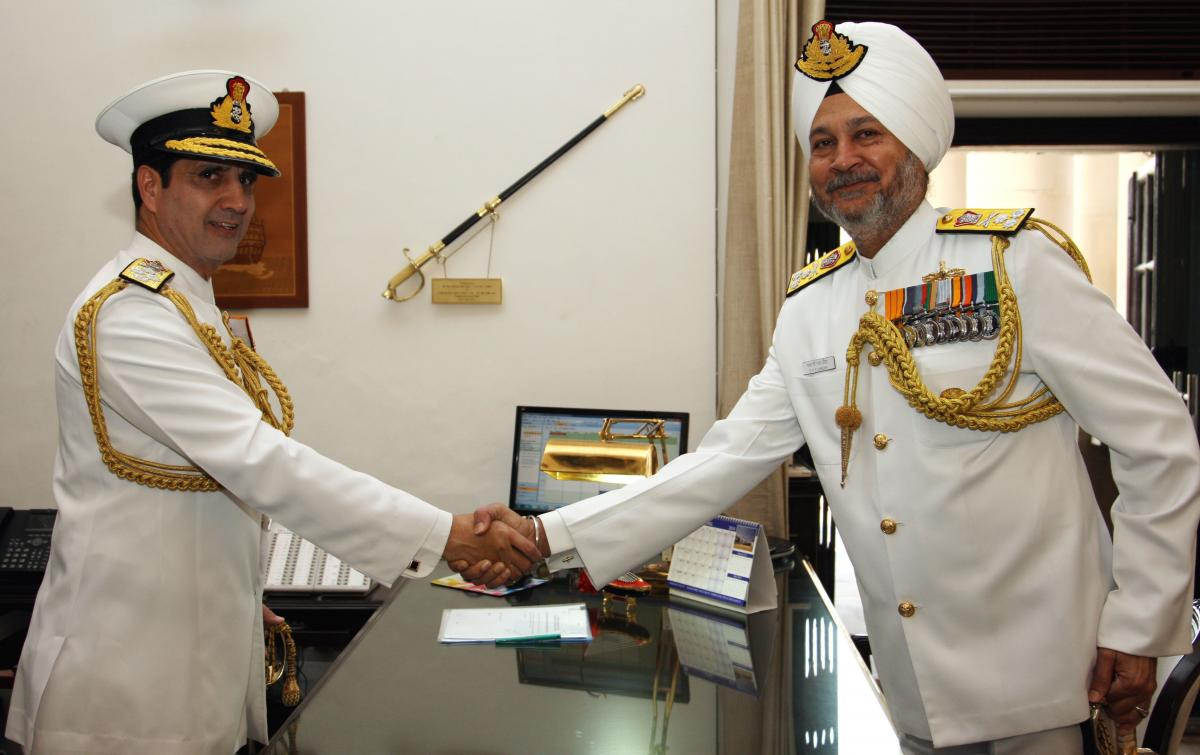
Admiral Robin K. Dhowan being congratulated by SPS Cheema after taking over as new Chief of Naval Staff

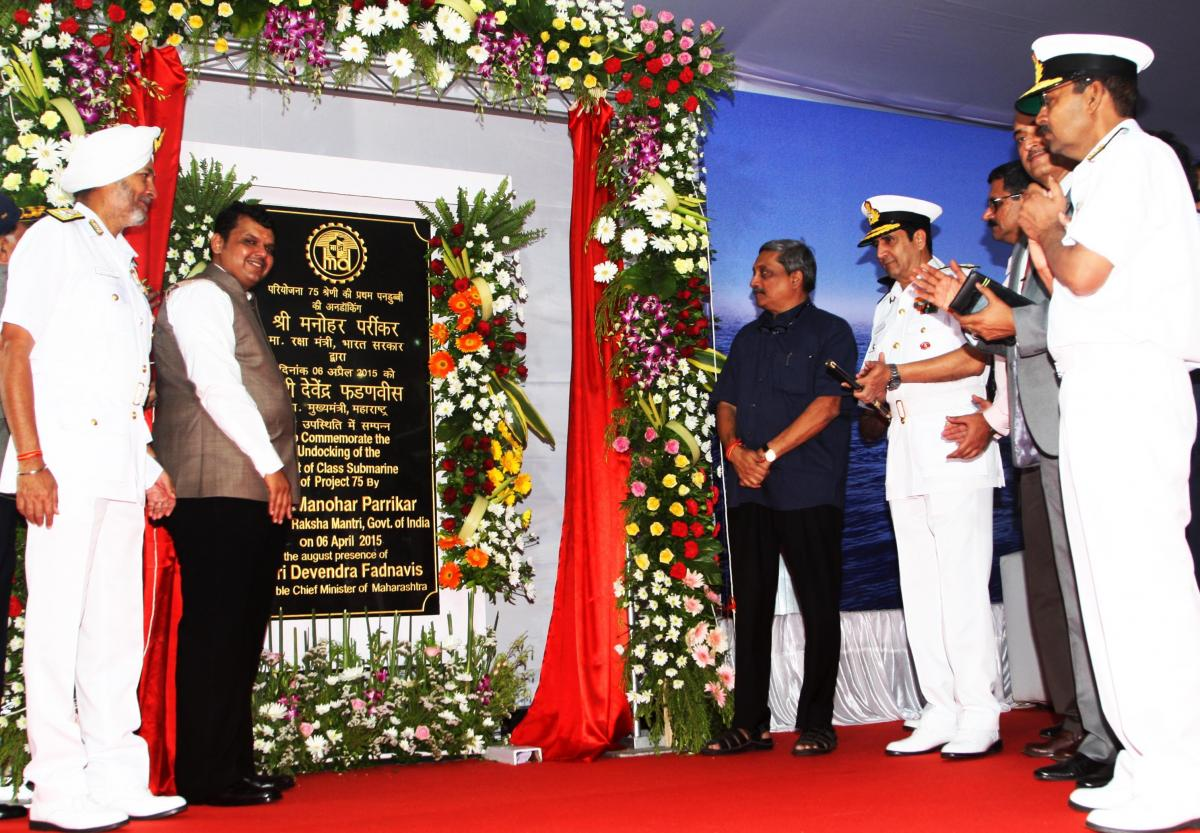
Defence Minister Manohar Parrikar, Maharashtra Chief Minister Devendra Fadnavis, the Chief of the Naval Staff Admiral Robin K. Dhowan and other dignitaries at the undocking of INS Kalvari

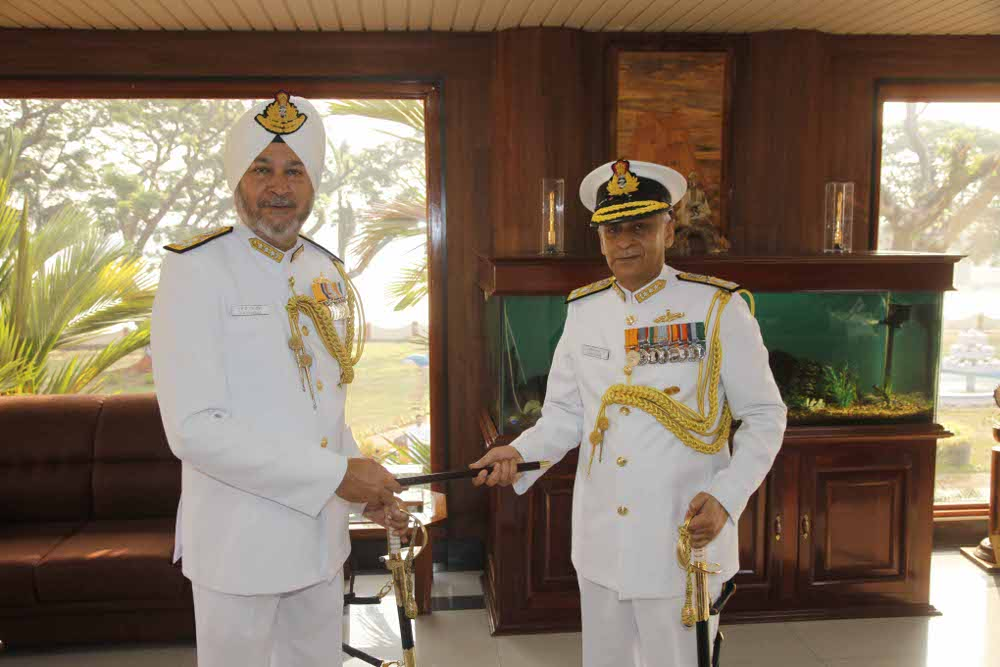
Exchange of the baton between Vice Admiral SPS Cheema and Vice AdmiralSunil Lanba

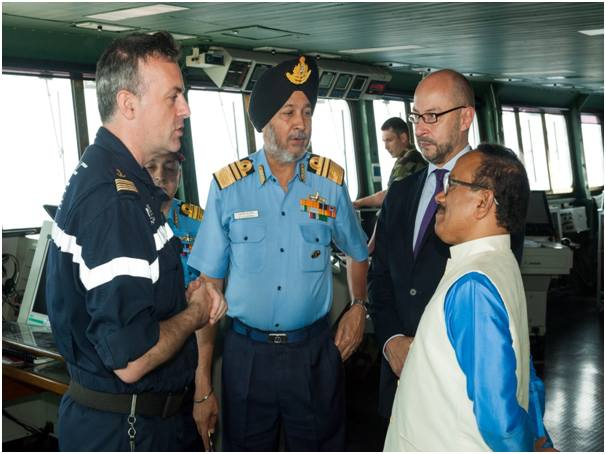
Goa Chief Minister Laxmikant Parsekar and Vice Admiral SPS Cheema onboard FNS Charles De Gaulle

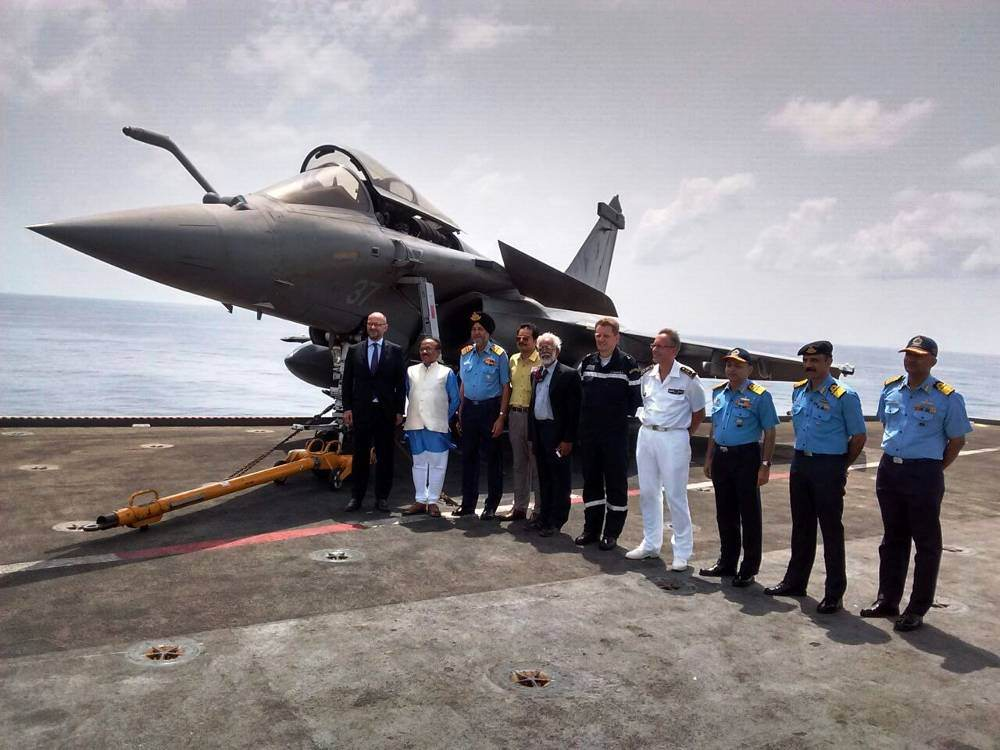
Goa Chief Minister Laxmikant Parsekar, Vice Admiral SPS Cheema, and Indian and French naval personnel onboard aircraft carrier Charles de Gaulle

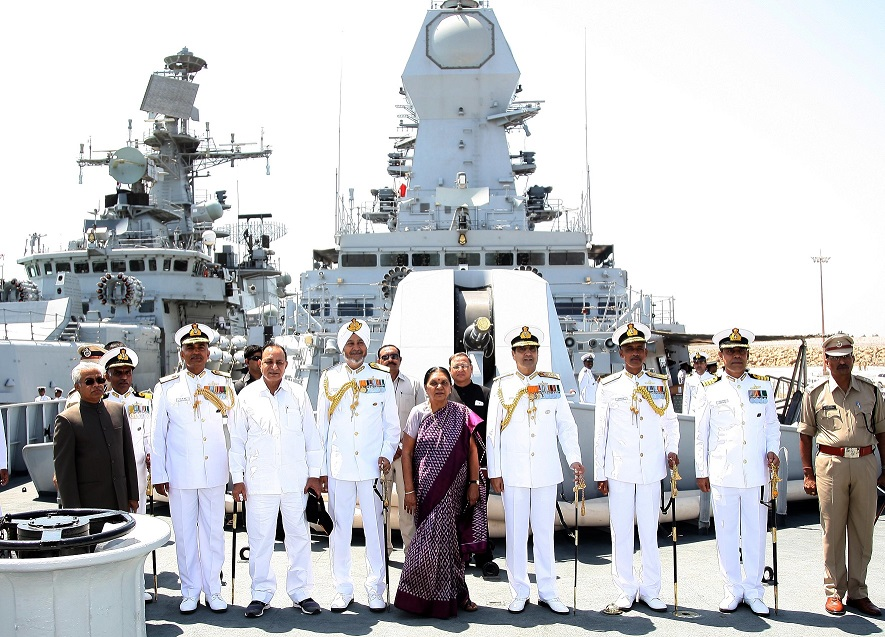
Gujarat Chief Minister Anandiben Patel onboard INS Kolkata

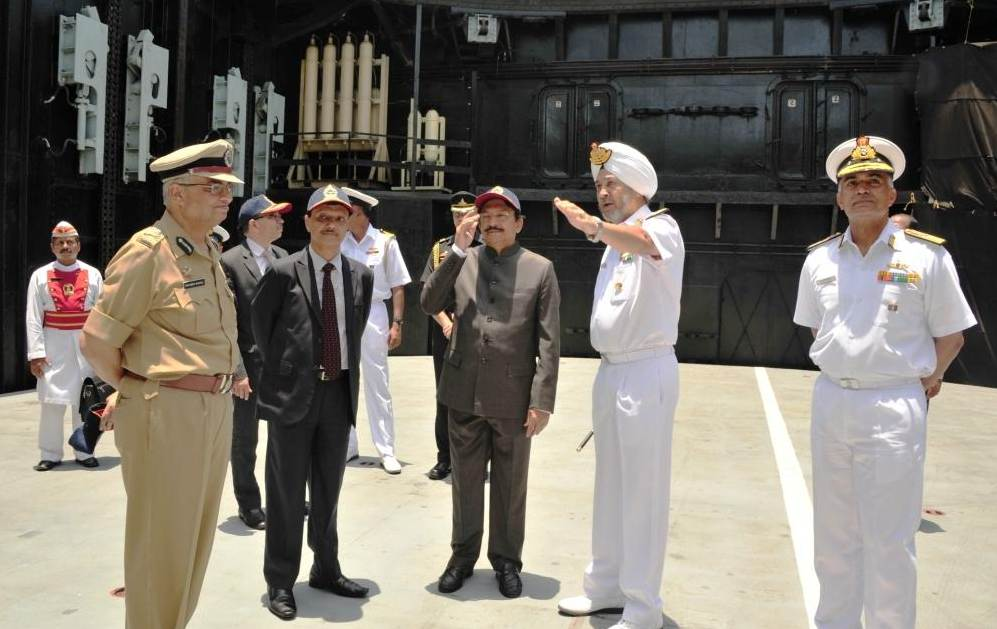
C. Vidyasagar Rao, Governor of Maharashtra, during his visit to INS Shishumar

Military offices
Preceded by Anil Chopra	Flag Officer Commanding-in-Chief Western Naval Command; 2015-2016	Succeeded by Sunil Lanba
Preceded by Satish Soni	Flag Officer Commanding-in-Chief Southern Naval Command; 2014-2015	Succeeded by Sunil Lanba
Preceded by Air Marshal K J Mathews	Commander-in-Chief, Strategic Forces Command; 1 November 2012 - June 2014	Succeeded by Lt Gen Amit Sharma
Preceded by Vice Admiral Shekhar Sinha	Chief of Integrated Defence Staff; 31 August 2012 – 1 November 2012	Succeeded by Lt Gen Naresh Chandra Marwah
Preceded by Anil Chopra	Flag Officer Commanding Western Fleet; 27 November 2008 - 31 August 2009	Succeeded by Rama Kant Pattanaik
Preceded by Pradeep Chauhan	Commanding Officer INS Viraat; 31 May 2005 - 15 May 2006	Succeeded by Girish Luthra
