= Antagarh =

- Town
- Location in Chhattisgarh, India Antagarh (India)
- Coordinates: 20°5′33″N 81°9′23″E
- Country: India
- State: Chhattisgarh
- District: Kanker

Area
  - Total: 9.45 km^{2} (3.65 sq mi)

Population
  - Total: 6,777
  - Density: 717/km^{2} (1,860/sq mi)

Languages
  - Official: Hindi, Halbi
- Time zone: UTC+5:30 (IST)

Antagarh is a town and a Nagar Panchayat located in the Kanker district of Chhattisgarh, India. It is the administrative headquarters of its eponymous development block, tehsil, and Assembly constituency.

== History ==
Antagarh is the last fortress falling in the erstwhile princely state of Bastar. The kings of Bastar used to come to this end of the princely state and take cognizance, thus the town used to serve as a King halt. Tehsil was established here by the British around the year 1900. After the bifurcation of Bastar district in 1998, it became a part of the Kanker district.

== Geography ==
Antagarh tehsil is surrounded by Bhanupratappur and Kanker tehsils to the north, Amabeda tehsil and Kondagaon district to the east, Narayanpur district to the south and Koyalibeda and Durgukondal tehsils to the west.

== Demographics ==
As of the 2011 census, the town has a population of 6,777, of which 3,408 are male and 3,369 are female, i.e., a sex ratio of 989. There was a population increase of 32 percent since 2001, and the town had an 83 percent literacy rate.

=== Religion ===
Religion in Antagarh town (2011 census)
Religion	Percent
Hinduism	90.04%
Islam	3.53%
Christianity	1.53%
Buddhism	1.67%
Jainism	0.99%
Sikhism	0.18%
Others	1.95%

The overwhelming majority of the population of Antagarh is Hindu, with Muslims, Christians, Buddhists, Jains and Sikhs and having small populations.

== Transport ==
=== Road ===
Antagarh is situated on Chhattisgarh State Highway (SH) 5. It is well connected to all major towns and cities in the state by regular bus service. Its approximate distance from important local towns and major cities by road is as follows:

Town/City	Distance
Koyalibeda	25 km (16 mi)
Bhanupratappur	30 km (19 mi)
Durgukondal	35 km (22 mi)
Amabeda	40 km (25 mi)
Narayanpur	50 km (31 mi)
Dalli-Rajhara	60 km (37 mi)
Kapsi	70 km (43 mi)
Kanker	75 km (47 mi)
Pakhanjur	80 km (50 mi)
Durg-Bhilai	140 km (87 mi)
Jagdalpur	170 km (110 mi)
Raipur	200 km (120 mi)

=== Rail ===
Antagarh is situated on the Dalli Rajhara–Jagdalpur line of South East Central Railway zone. The town made its official debut on the Indian Railway network on 13 August 2022, with the inauguration of daily DEMU passenger service to Raipur. The railway line has established direct rail connectivity between Antagarh and the state capital, Raipur, as well as the industrial town of Bhilai.

=== Air ===
The nearest airport is Swami Vivekananda Airport in Raipur, 180 km (110 mi) away by road.
