= Bande, Chhattisgarh =

Bande
- Village
- Interactive map of Bande
- Location in Chhattisgarh, India Bande (India)
- Coordinates: 19.924086°N 80.541993°E
- Country: India
- State: Chhattisgarh
- District: Kanker

Population (2011)
  - Total: 3,308

Languages
  - Official: Chhattisgarhi, Hindi, Bangla
- Time zone: UTC+5:30 (IST)
- PIN: 494 777
- Telephone code: 91 7844
- Vehicle registration: CG 19

Bande, also known as Bande Colony, is a village and the headquarters of the eponymous tehsil in the Kanker District of Chhattisgarh in India. It is also the headquarters of the West Kapsi forest subdivision and two forest ranges, namely East Paralkot and West Paralkot.

== Geography ==
Bande is located on Chhattisgarh State Highway 25 in the Paralkot region, 67 km (42 mi) west of the block headquarters Koyalibeda and 130 km (81 mi) south-west of Kanker. Its distance from the state capital Raipur is 250 km (160 mi), from Kapsi is 30 km (19 mi) and from Pakhanjur is 20 km (12 mi).

== Demographics ==
As of the 2011 Indian Census, Bande Colony had a population of 3,308, consisting of 1,729 males and 1,579 females. The population of children aged 0-6 was 410; 12% of the population. The male:female sex ratio is 913, lower than the state average of 991. The child sex ratio in Pakhanjur is around 943 compared to the state average of 969. The effective literacy rate of people seven years and above is 87.3%; the male literacy is around 92.49% and the female literacy rate is 81.52%.
