= Durgukondal =

Village in Chhattisgarh, India

Coordinates: 20.033°N 80.983°E

Durgukondal is a village in the Kanker district (North Bastar) of Chhattisgarh state, central India. It is the administrative headquarters of its eponymous development block, tehsil and forest range. The 2011 Census of India recorded 1,609 inhabitants in this village.

== Geography ==
Durgukondal is situated on Chhattisgarh State Highway 25, approximately 20 km (12 mi) southwest of Bhanupratappur, 67 km (42 mi) west of the district headquarters Kanker and 175 km (109 mi) south of the state capital Raipur. Its distance from Antagarh is 34 km (21 mi), Kapsi is 36 km (22 mi), Manpur is 42 km (26 mi) and Pakhanjur is 47 km (29 mi).

== See also ==
- Kanker district
