= Bhanupratappur railway station =

Railway station in India

Bhanupratappur
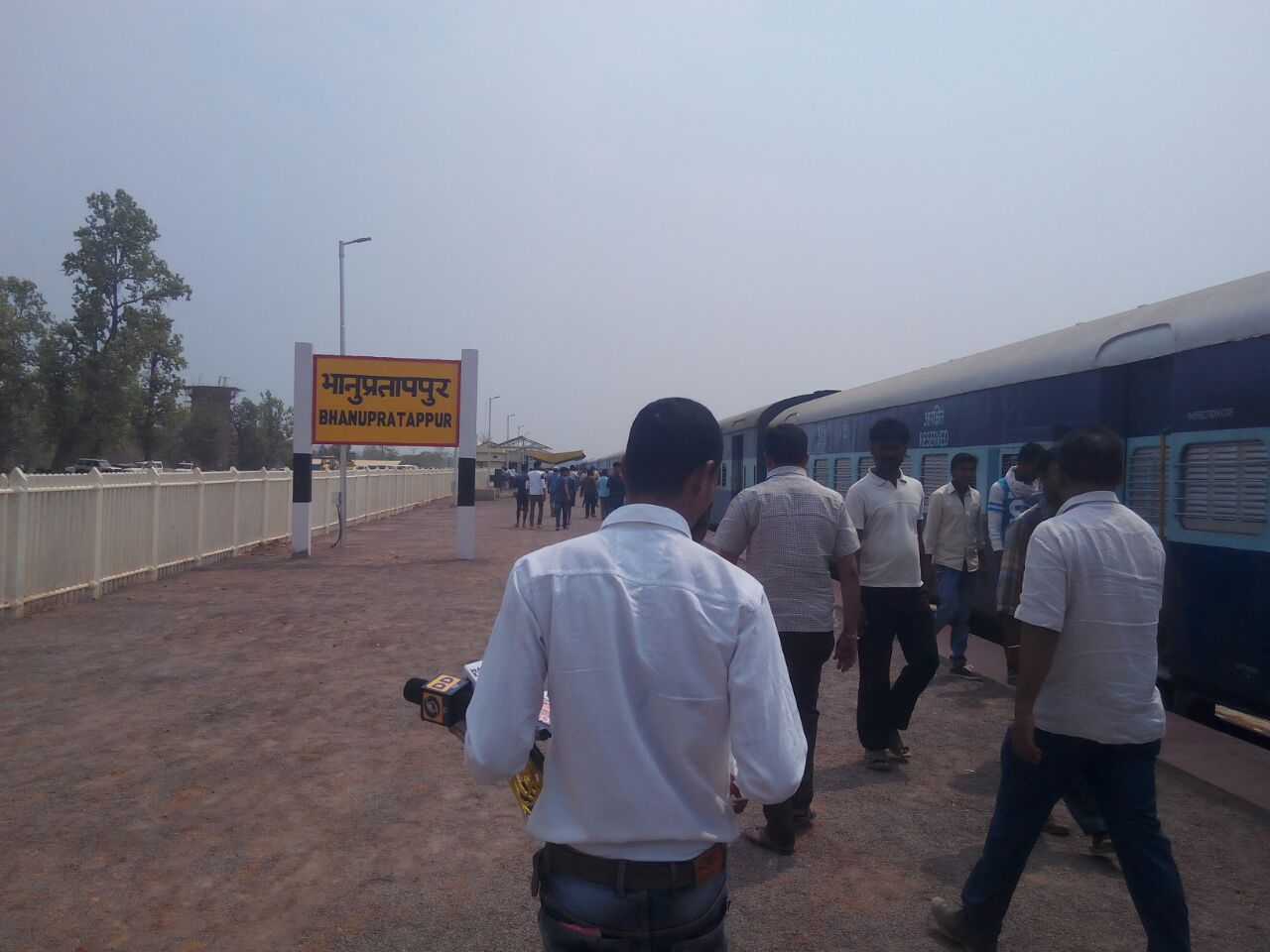
- Bhanupratappur railway station

General information
- Location: Sambalpur–Bhanupratappur Road, Bhanupratappur, Chhattisgarh; India
- Coordinates: 20.2975°N 81.0646°E
- Elevation: 290 m (951 ft)
- System: Regional rail station
- Owner: Indian Railways
- Line: Dalli Rajhara–Jagdalpur line
- Platforms: 1
- Tracks: 5 ft 6 in (1,676 mm) broad gauge

Construction
- Structure type: Standard (on ground station)
- Parking: Available

Other information
- Station code: BPTP
- Zone(s): South East Central Railway
- Division(s): Raipur

History
- Opened: 2017

Services
Preceding station	Indian Railways	Following station
Gudum towards ?	South East Central Railway zone Dalli Rajhara–Jagdalpur line	Keoti towards ?
Location
- Location within Chhattisgarh Location within India

Bhanupratappur Railway Station is a station in Bhanupratappur in Kanker district in the Indian state of Chhattisgarh. It is the primary railhead in the Kanker district, situated 50 km (31 mi) from the district headquarters Kanker.

Bhanupratappur lies on the Dalli Rajhara–Jagdalpur line, which is currently under construction. As of August 2020, laying of tracks, construction of station, and trial run of locomotives have been completed until Antagarh (AAGH), 25 km (16 mi) to the south of Bhanupratappur. Services have been made operational up to Keoti (KETI), which is 8 km (5.0 mi) to the south. Daily DEMU services between Keoti and Raipur serve the station.

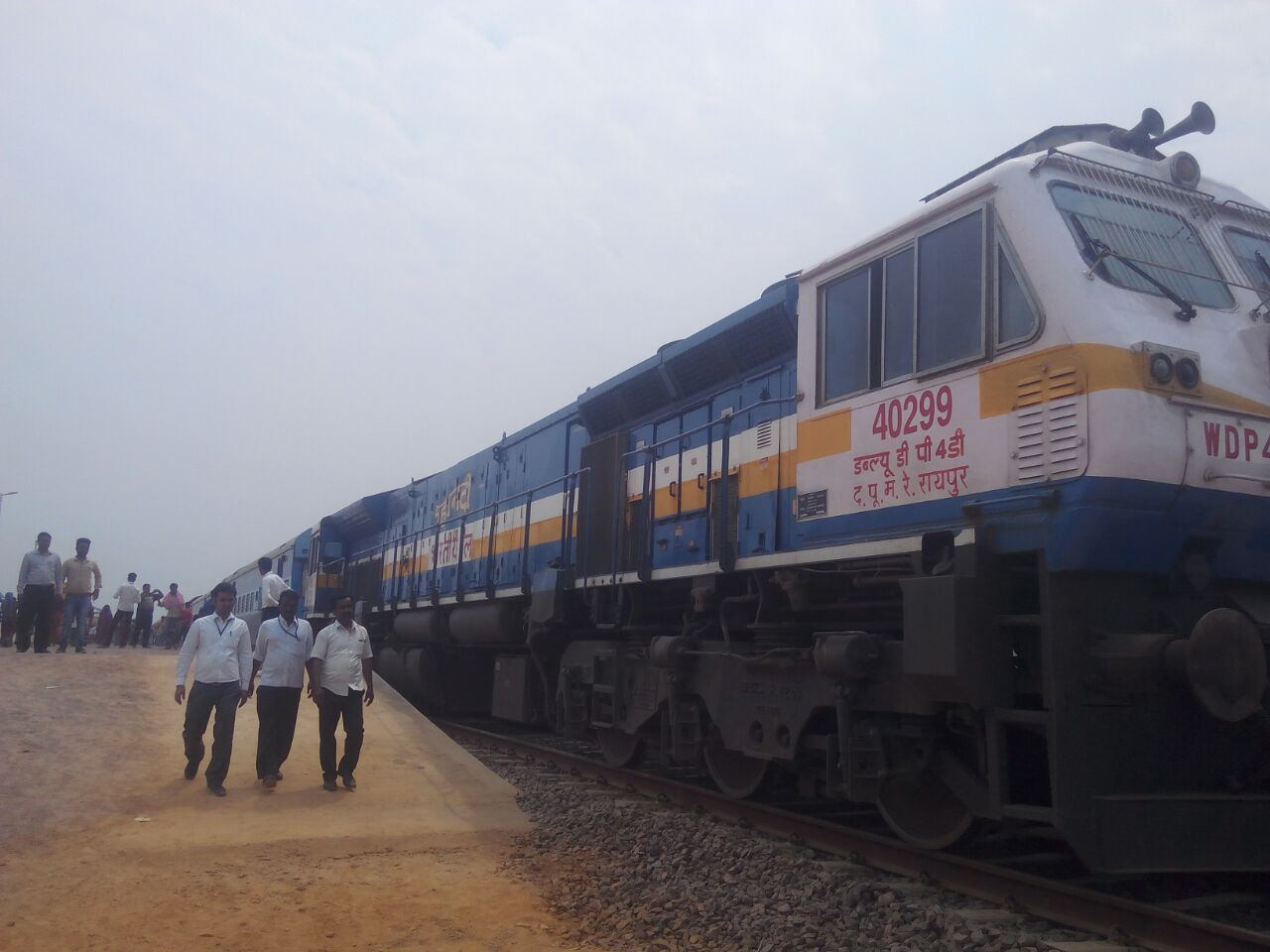
Platform
