= Manpur, Chhattisgarh =

Manpur
- Village
- Manpur
- Location in Chhattisgarh, India Manpur (India)
- Coordinates: 20.373341°N 80.726550°E
- Country: India
- State: Chhattisgarh
- District: Mohla-Manpur-Ambagarh Chowki

Population (2001)
  - Total: 4,363

Languages
  - Official: Hindi, Chhattisgarhi
- Time zone: UTC+5:30 (IST)
- PIN: 491229
- Vehicle registration: CG

Manpur is a village and a tehsil in the Mohla-Manpur-Ambagarh Chowki district of Chhattisgarh state in India.

== Geography ==
Manpur is situated on National Highway 930 at a distance of approximately 25 km (16 mi) from the district headquarters Mohla, 50 km (31 mi) from the largest town in the district Ambagarh Chowki, 105 km (65 mi) from the previous district headquarters Rajnandgaon and 170 km (110 mi) from the state capital Raipur. Its distance from other nearby towns namely, Kapsi is 40 km (25 mi), Bhanupratappur is 45 km (28 mi), Dalli Rajhara is 50 km (31 mi), Balod is 70 km (43 mi), Gadchiroli and Kanker is 90 km (56 mi).

== Demographics ==
As of 2011 India census, Manpur had a population of 4363. Males constitute 53.80% of the population and females 46.20%. The Female Sex Ratio is 859 against the state average of 991. Manpur has an average literacy rate of 86.64%, higher than the state average of 70.28%; with 93.50% of the males and 78.54% of females literate. 11.46% of the population is under 6 years of age.
