= Kherkatta Dam =

Dam in Chhattisgarh, India

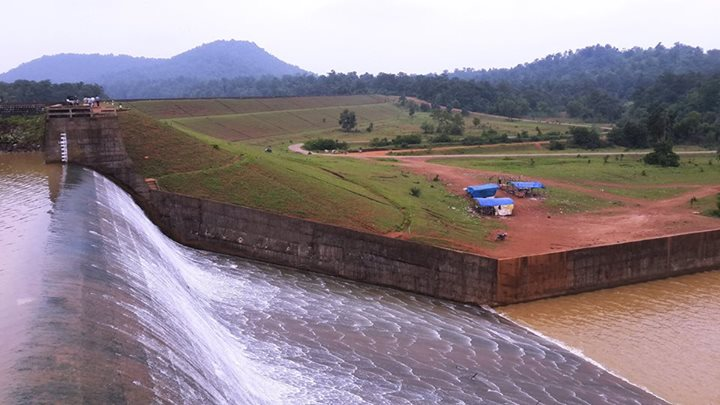
- Floodgates of Kherkatta Dam

- Location within Chhattisgarh Location within India
- Coordinates: 20°9′17.25″N 80°38′32.21″E
- Construction began: 1966
- Opening date: 1981
- Construction cost: ₹5.46 crore (US$570,000) in 1964

Dam and spillways
- Type of dam: Embankment, earth-fill
- Impounds: Kotri River
- Height: 20 m (66 ft)
- Length: 610 m (2,000 ft)

Reservoir
- Creates: Paralkot Reservoir
- Total capacity: 6,550,000 m^{3} (5,310 acre⋅ft)

Kherkatta Dam is a medium irrigation project built across the Kotri River, about 10 km (6.2 mi) northwest of Kapsi in the Kanker district of Chhattisgarh, India. It is the largest dam of the district and gets its name from the neighbouring village of Kherkatta. The lake that the dam forms behind it is officially known as the Paralkot Reservoir, which extends in a northwest direction and partially into the Mohla-Manpur-Ambagarh Chowki district. The distance of the dam is approximately 20 km (12 mi) from Pakhanjur, 35 km (22 mi) from Manpur and 110 km (68 mi) from Kanker.

The construction of the dam began in 1966 and was completed in 1981 by the Dandakaranya Development Authority, over a period of 15 years. The total cost of construction was estimated at ₹5.46 crore (US$570,000). It was handed over to the state government in the year 1986 and placed under the Kapsi Water Resource Subdivision for its upkeep and maintenance.

== Construction details ==
The length of the dam is 610 m (2,001 ft), the height above the lowest foundation is 20 m (66 ft) and the highest flood level is 291.23 m (955 ft). Spread over an area of 1,300 acres (530 ha), its gross storage volume is 6,550,000 m^{3} (5,310 acre⋅ft) and designed max. irrigation area is 24,011.23 acres (9,717.00 ha).

== Benefits ==
The Kherkatta dam was built in hopes of benefiting the locals with better irrigation and cultivation systems. The reservoir consists of two major gates which release water every couple of years through its canals. The artificial lake is used to store water.

- Local water supply
- Distant water supply, if water is sent to cities via aqueducts
- Local source of fishing & boating
- Wildlife habitat
- Increased water pressure for those living in the valley
- Power generation
- Irrigation
- Flood water control

== Ichthyofaunal diversity ==
The survey for Ichthyofaunal diversity study in the Paralkot Reservoir of Kanker District was mainly focused on Ichthyofaunal diversity. 25 Species of fishes belonging to 5 orders 11 family and 20 genera was recorded during the study. Cyprinidae were most dominant group represent by 12 species, Siluridae with 2 species, Ophiocephalidae with 2 species, Bagridae 1 species, Mestacemballidae with 2 species, Saccobranchidae 1 species, Claridae 1 species, Centropomidae 1 species, Notopteridae 1 species, Gobiidae 1 species and Cichlidae 1 species. This was the first ever study on the fish diversity of reservoir and would help in explore the fish fauna of Kherkatta dam.

== Low utilization of developed water resources ==
The actual utilization as compared with the designed potential is very poor, about 69%. The reason could be the low rainfall or the low maintenance of the canal system.

== Controversy ==
In May 2023, a food inspector from Pakhanjur ordered workers at the dam to drain over 2 million litres of water. The government official ordered the water to be drained after he accidentally dropped his phone into the waste weir of the dam while taking a selfie.

Footage of the official sitting under an umbrella as water was pumped out of the reservoir was uploaded to social media. After the video went viral, the food inspector, the SDO of the Kapsi water resource subdivision and a sub-engineer were suspended from their positions.
