= Pakhanjur =

Pakhanjur Pakhanjore
- Town
- Interactive map of Pakhanjur
- Location in Chhattisgarh, India Pakhanjur (India)
- Coordinates: 20.0346544°N 80.6255085°E
- Country: India
- State: Chhattisgarh
- District: Kanker
- Established: 1958

Government
  - Type: Nagar Panchayat (Notified Area Council)
  - Body: Nagar Panchayat Pakhanjur
  - Council President: Narayan Saha (BJP)
  - Sub-Divisional Magistrate: Anjor Singh Paikra
  - Additional Superintendent of Police: Rakesh Kumar Kurre (IPS)
  - Sub-Divisional Police Officer: Ravi Kumar Kujur

Population (2011)
  - Total: 10,201

Language
  - Official: Hindi, Chhattisgarhi
  - Others: Bengali
- Time zone: UTC+5:30 (IST)
- PIN: 494 776
- Telephone code: 91 7844
- Vehicle registration: CG 19
- Sex ratio: 991 ♂/900♀

Pakhanjur, also known as Pakhanjore, is a town, nagar panchayat, and the headquarters of the eponymous tehsil in the Kanker District of Chhattisgarh State in India. According to the 2011 Census of India, it is the second largest town in the district by population, only second to the district headquarters, Kanker. It is located 120 km (75 mi) southwest of Kanker and 47 km (29 mi) west of the block headquarters, Koyalibeda.

== Name ==
The name of the town is written as "पखांजूर" in Devanagari script. However, it is transliterated as Pakhanjur and Pakhanjore in English. The former notably supported by Indian Census sources, while the latter was utilised by the Dandakaranya Project report submitted to the Rajya Sabha in August 1974.

== History ==
During the pre-independence era, the entire area covered by the Pakhanjur tehsil today, along with the Bande and Koyalibeda tehsils and parts of Abujhmarh, formed the erstwhile Paralkot jagir. In 1825, the region became the theatre of a tribal uprising led by Gaind Singh, a tribal leader and the zamindar of Paralkot, against the British Raj. Popularly known as the Paralkot Rebellion, the uprising saw the rebels fight against the exploitation and injustices meted out to the natives by the foreign powers. It ended with the capture and execution by hanging of the revered tribal leader on 20 January 1825. Subsequently, he came to be honoured as the first martyr of Chhattisgarh.

In 1958, the Pakhanjur Colony that forms the heart of the town, was established along with the neighbouring settlements of Kapsi and Bande under the Dandakaranya Project.

=== Dandakaranya project ===
The Indian government created the Dandakaranya Development Authority in 1958 to assist refugees from East Pakistan (now Bangladesh). It constructed the Bhaskel Dam and Paralkot reservoir (Kherkatta Dam), woodworking centers at Jagdalpur, Boregaon, and Umerkote, and roads and railways in the refugee resettlement areas, including the Balangir-Kozilum railway project. A factory that mainly produces aircraft engines is located at Sunabeda. The National Mineral Development Corporation works iron ore at Bailadila. Important towns are Jagdalpur, Bhawanipatna, and Koraput. The project was known as the Dandakaranya Project.

A large number of people from East Pakistan, which is now Bangladesh were settled at the newly formed 133 settlements, each designated as a Paralkot Village (PV) and numbered from PV 1 to PV 133, in areas of Kapsi, Pakhanjur and Bande. These people suffered heavy losses leaving hundreds of acres of agricultural fields and adjusted with very small land for survival.

== Geography ==
Pakhanjur tehsil is surrounded by the Durgukondal tehsil and Mohla Manpur district to the north, Koyalibeda tehsil to the east, Bande tehsil to the south and the Gadchiroli district of Maharashtra to the west.

=== Deforestation ===
Many people here are affected because of deforestation here. Every year lakhs of trees are cut down for industrial purpose. The green belt is slowly turning into an orange area which is dangerous. New programs need to be initiated to promote greenery and planting of trees.

== Demographics ==
As of the 2011 Indian Census, Pakhanjur nagar panchayat had a population of 10,201, consisting of 5,370 males and 4,831 females. The population of children aged 0–6 was 1,207; 11.83% of the population. The male:female sex ratio is 900, lower than the state average of 991. The child sex ratio in Pakhanjur is around 904 compared to the state average of 969. The effective literacy rate of people seven years and above is 86.86%; the male literacy is around 91.64% and the female literacy rate is 81.54%. There were 2,332 households. The Scheduled Castes and Scheduled Tribes populations were 508 and 1,201 respectively.

=== Religion ===
Religion in Pakhanjur town (2011 census)
Religion	Percent
Hinduism	97.35%
Christianity	0.81%
Sikhism	0.64%
Islam	0.61%
Others	0.59%

The overwhelming majority of the population of Pakhanjur is Hindu, with Christians, Sikhs and Muslims having small populations.

== Government and politics ==
=== Administration ===
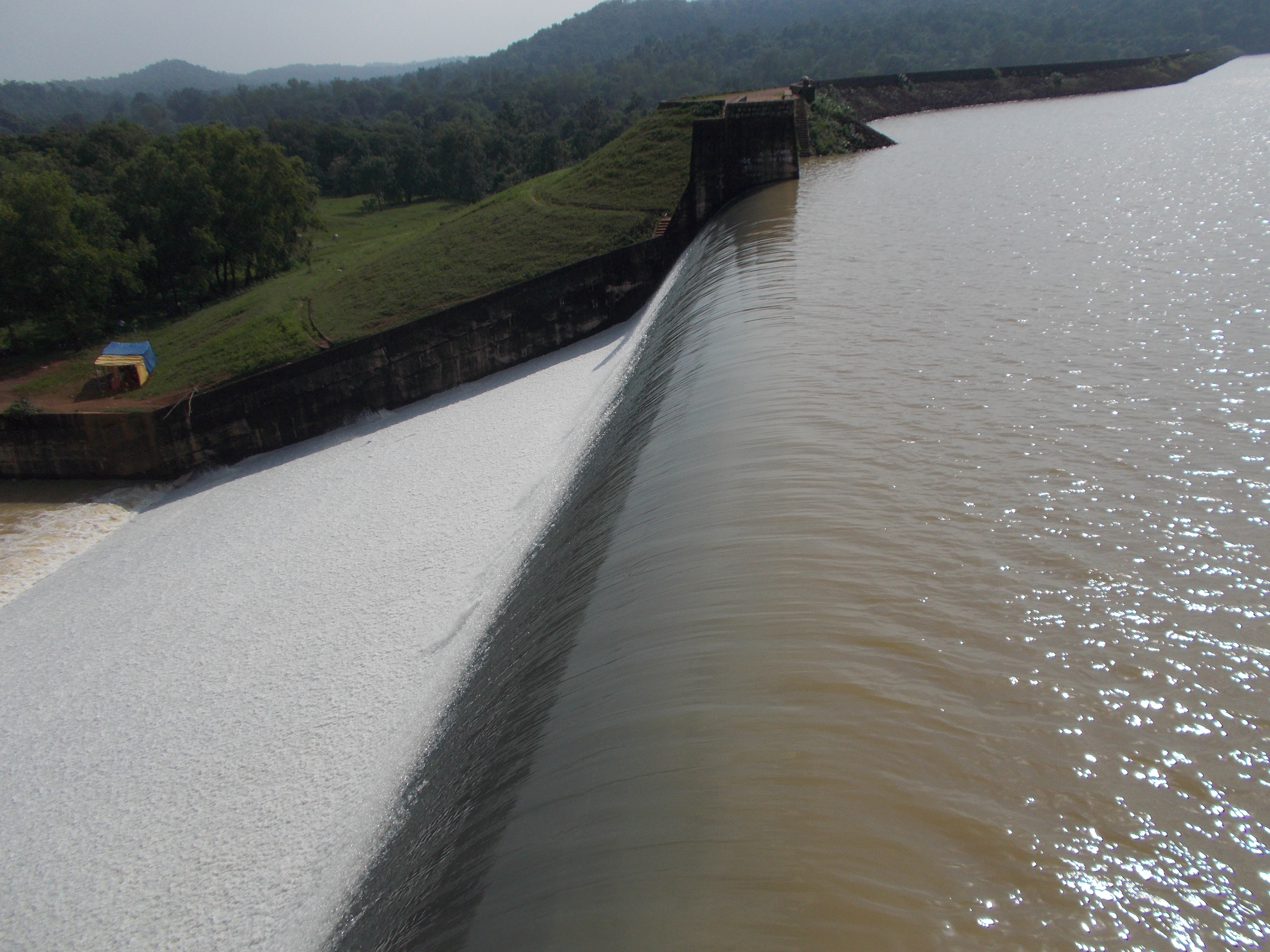
Kherkatta Reservoir near Kapsi

The sub-district code of Pakhanjur tehsil is 03354 and the total number of villages is 299.

=== Post office ===
The pin-code of Pakhanjur is 494776, and the sub post office is Pakhanjur Camp.

=== Healthcare ===
==== Hospitals ====
- Government Civil Hospital Pakhanjore
- Veterinary Hospital Pakhanjore

== Economy ==
The Hahaladdi Iron Ore Deposit project site is connected through State highway SH-6.

There is no major industrial activity in Pakhanjur tehsil. Small-scale industries include a handful of rice mills and stone crusher plants. Majority of the population and hence the economy is primarily dependent on agriculture.

Pakhanjur town has two prominent bazaars namely, the old market and the new market, as the trade and commerce centres. Kapsi and Bande are the other important bazaars of the tehsil.

== Attractions ==
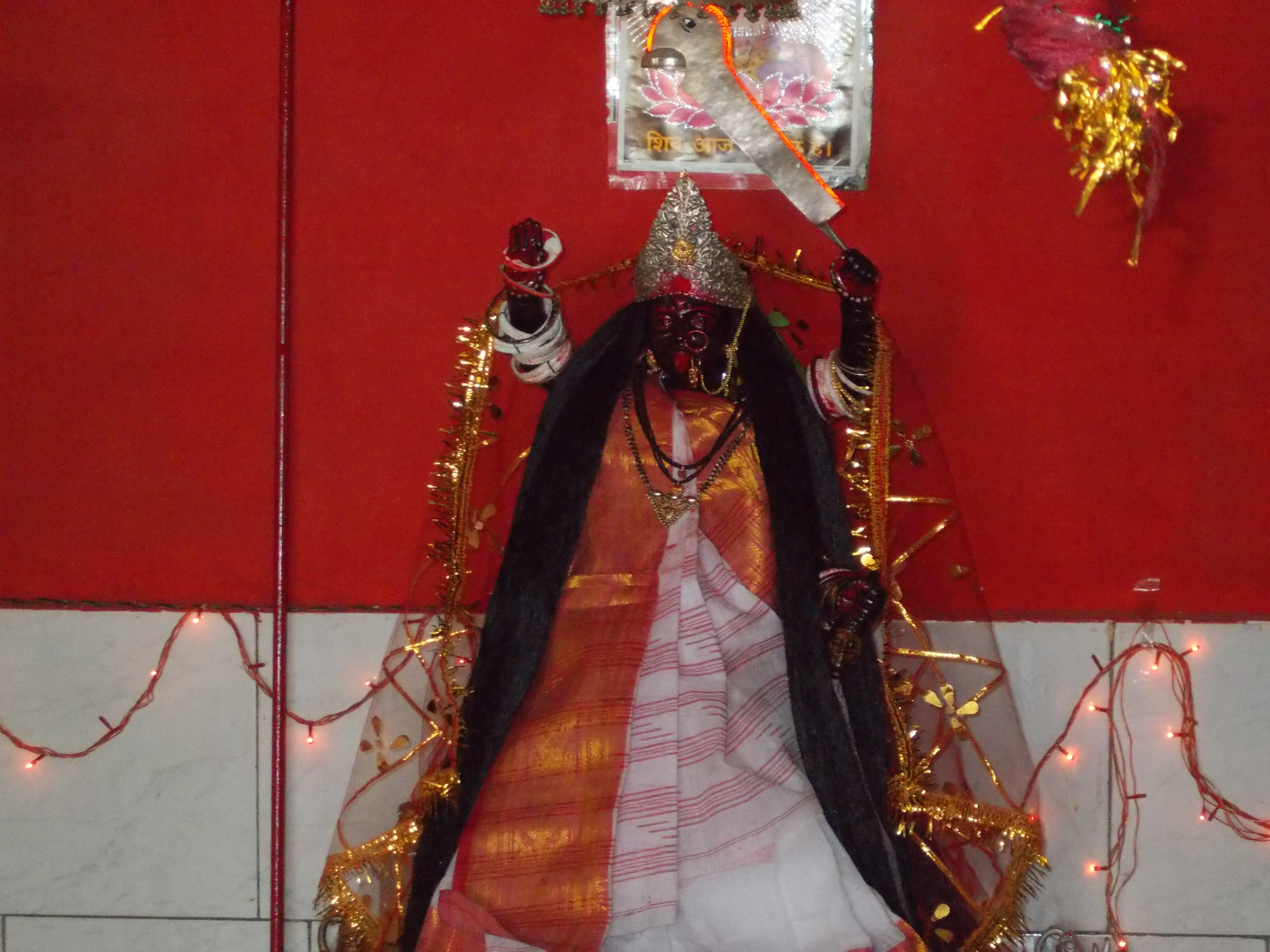
Kali Mandir, Pakhanjur

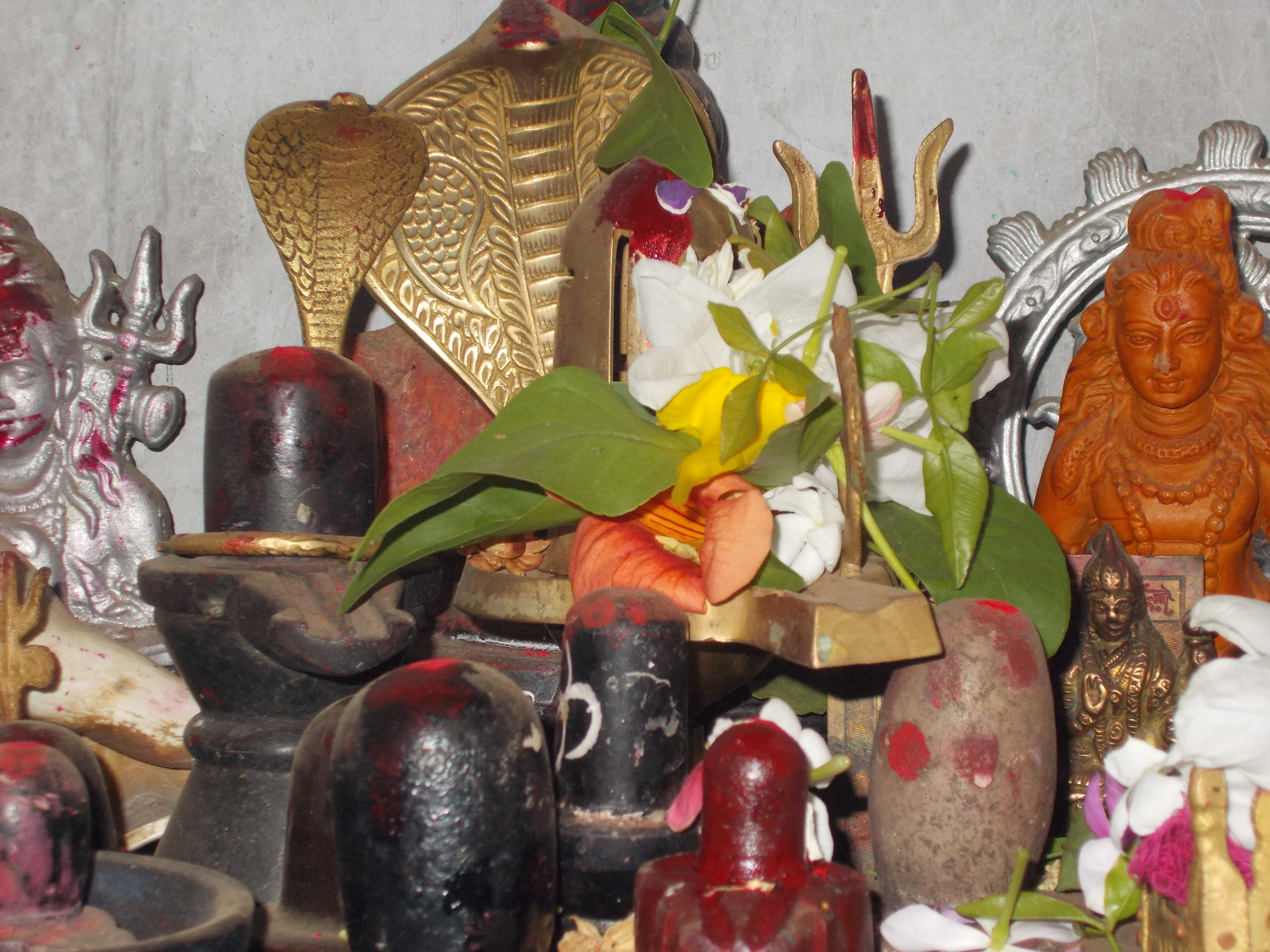
Shiv Mandir, Pakhanjur

- Kherkatta Reservoir which is situated near Kapsi.
- Nara Narayan Mela or Pakhanjur Mela
- Nara Narayana Sevashram
- Kali Mandir
- Shiv Mandir
- Satsang Vihar, Shri Shri Thakur Anukulchandra Temple, situated in the heart of Pakhanjur
- Ram Vatika
- Satyanand Nagar

== Transport ==
=== Roadways ===
Pakhanjur is situated on Chhattisgarh State Highway 25 and is only connected by road from Durg, Raipur, Kanker, Dalli Rajhara, Bhanupratappur, Jagdalpur, Gadchiroli and Chandrapur. Its distance is 250 km (160 mi) from the state capital Raipur.

=== Railways ===
Railway services are non-existent in Pakhanjur. The nearest major railway station is Durg Jn. (DURG) on the Howrah–Nagpur–Mumbai line 190 km (120 mi) from Pakhanjur. The nearest local railway station is Keoti (KETI) on the Dalli Rajhara–Jagdalpur line 62 km (39 mi) away.

There has been demands from various quarters to construct the proposed Gadchiroli-Bhanupratappur rail line via Durgukondal, Kapsi and Pakhanjur instead of via Manpur. This proposed line when completed, would serve as an alternative route between Nagpur and Vishakhapatnam — one of the busiest freight corridors in the country — by linking the Nagpur-Wadsa-Gadchiroli line to the Bhanupratappur-Jagdalpur-Vishakhapatnam line. If the demands are met, it would provide a much needed impetus to the development of this area.

In May 2022, the Ministry of Railways (India) provided in-principle approval for the survey of this line. It subsequently allocated a budget of ₹3.37 crore (US$350,000) for the survey, though the route and deadline were yet undecided. Given the importance of this project, the South Eastern Central Railway zone fast-tracked the regulatory process and in August of the same year floated tenders for the final location survey and preparation of the Detailed Project Report. The survey was commissioned soon after.

=== Airports ===
Pakhanjur's nearest commercial airport with regular scheduled flights is Swami Vivekananda Airport, Raipur 250 km (160 mi) away.

== Education ==
- Industrial Training Institute (ITI)
- Govt. Veer Gaind Singh College Pakhanjore

== Sports ==
The Netaji Subhash Chandra Bose Stadium Pakhanjur is famous for football and cricket tournaments. The stadium hosts annual celebrations on Independence Day (15 August) and Republic Day (26 January). All cultural and extracurricular activities are performed in the stadium and inter-school competitions are organised between them.

== See also ==
- List of cities in Chhattisgarh by population
