= Dalli-Rajhara railway station =

Railway station in Chhattisgarh

Dalli-Rajhara

General information
- Location: Dalli-Rajhara, Chhattisgarh; India
- Coordinates: 20.5877°N 81.0684°E
- Elevation: 412 metres (1,352 ft)
- System: Indian Railways station
- Owner: Indian Railways
- Operator: Raipur railway division
- Line: Dalli Rajhara–Jagdalpur line
- Platforms: 2
- Tracks: 5
- Connections: Auto stand

Construction
- Structure type: Standard (on-ground station)
- Parking: yes
- Cycle facilities: No

Other information
- Status: Functioning
- Station code: DRZ
- Fare zone: South East Central Railway
Location

Dalli-Rajhara Railway Station is a small railway station in Dalli-Rajhara, Chhattisgarh. Its code is DRZ. It serves Dalli Rajhara city. The station consists of two platforms. The platform is not well sheltered. It lacks many facilities including water and sanitation.

== Major trains ==
- Dalli Rajhara–Raipur DEMU
- Dalli Rajahra–Durg DEMU
- Dalli Rajhara–Durg Passenger Special
- Dalli Rajahra–Gondia DEMU
- Keoti–Durg DEMU
- Raipur–Gudum DEMU
- Dalli Rajahra–Keoti DEMU
