= Kapsi =

- Town
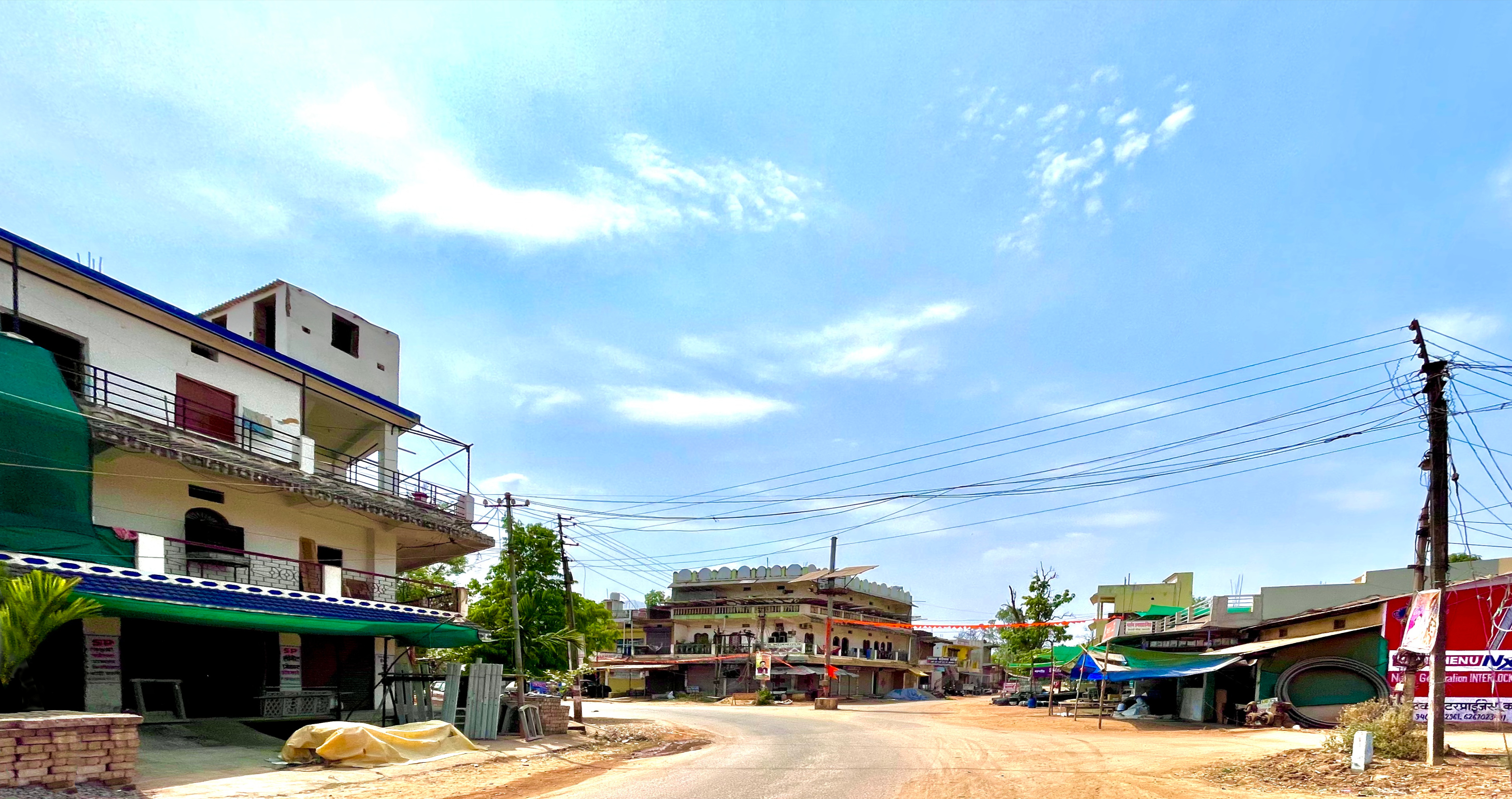
- Netaji Chowk, Chhote Kapsi
- Interactive map of Kapsi
- Location in Chhattisgarh, India Kapsi (India)
- Coordinates: 20.0907444°N 80.6770786°E
- Country: India
- State: Chhattisgarh
- District: Kanker

Area
  - Total: 11.93 km^{2} (4.61 sq mi)
- Highest elevation: 330 m (1,080 ft)
- Lowest elevation: 310 m (1,020 ft)

Population (2011)
  - Total: 4,179
  - Density: 350.3/km^{2} (907.3/sq mi)

Languages
  - Official: Chhattisgarhi, Hindi, Bangla
- Time zone: UTC+5:30 (IST)
- PIN: 494 771
- Telephone code: 91 7844
- Vehicle registration: CG 19

Kapsi is a census town in the Kanker district of Chhattisgarh, India. It is a model town under two schemes of the Government of India, the Sansad Adarsh Gram Yojana and the Shyama Prasad Mukherjee National Rurban Mission. It is also the headquarters of the Kapsi forest range, the East Kapsi forest subdivision and the Kapsi water resource subdivision. Owing to its sizeable tribal population, it is defined as a Scheduled Area under the Fifth Schedule of the Constitution of India.

== Geography ==
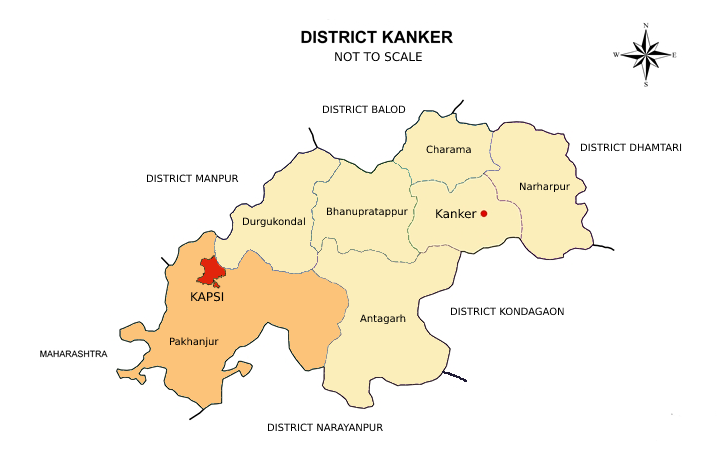
Location of Kapsi in Pakhanjur tehsil of Kanker district

Kapsi is located roughly 10 km (6.2 mi) northeast of the tehsil headquarters Pakhanjur and 100 km (62 mi) southwest of the district headquarters Kanker. It is bordered by the Durgukondal tehsil to its northeast. Due to its location at the northernmost boundary of the erstwhile Paralkot jagir, it is also known as the Gateway of Paralkot. Its proximity to the trijunction of Kanker and Mohla-Manpur-Ambagarh Chowki districts of Chhattisgarh and the Gadchiroli district of Maharashtra, makes it an important transit hub of the area.

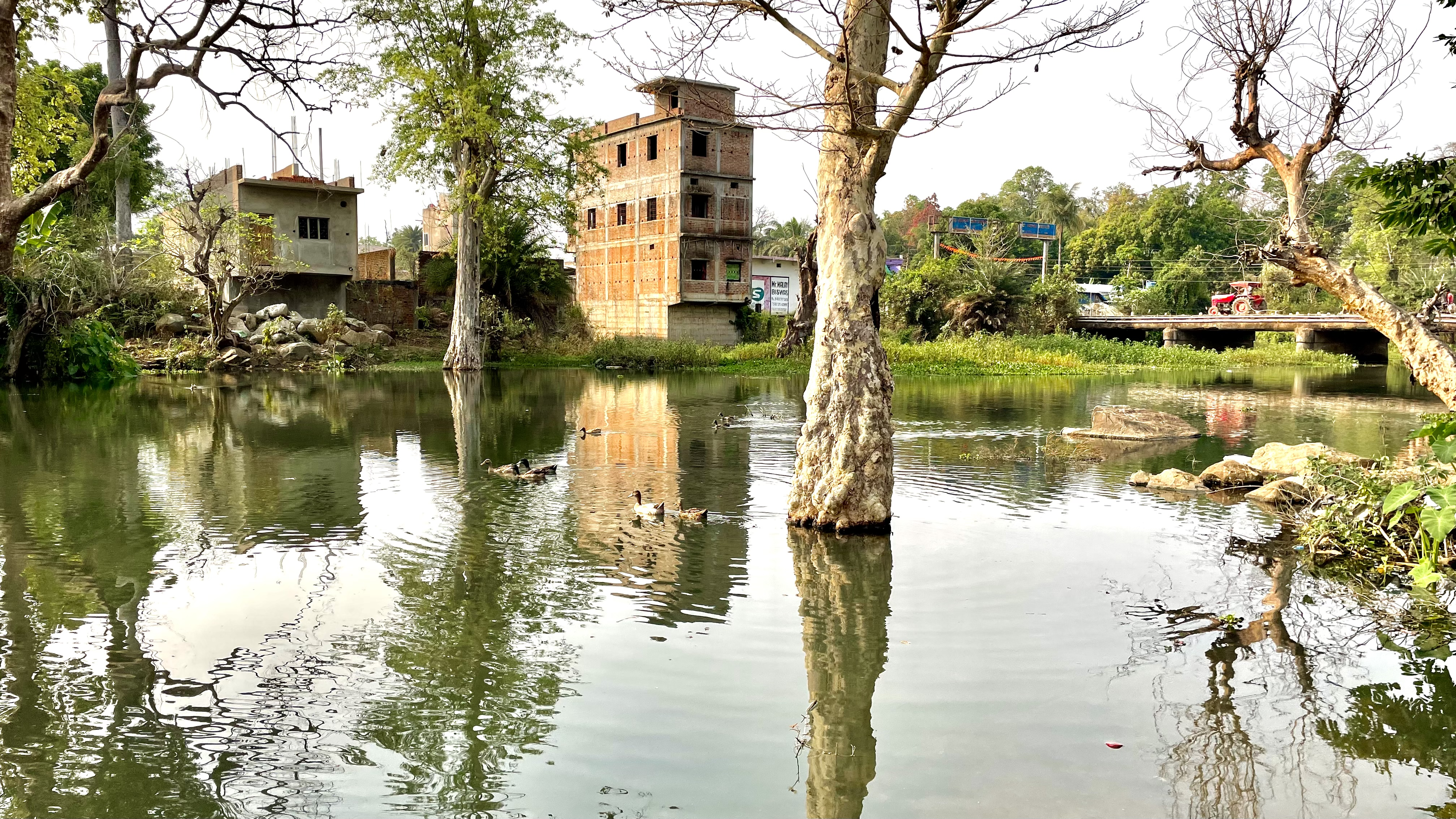
Devda ravine flowing through Kapsi

Geographically, it lies in the northern lowlands of the Bastar plateau and is a part of the historical Dandakaranya region. The elevation of the village ranges from 310 m (1,020 ft) to 330 m (1,080 ft) above sea level. The Devda ravine, a tributary of Kotri river, meanders through the heart of the village and serves as its lifeline. The region primarily features fertile lateritic soil, which is well-suited to agriculture due to its fine texture and darker hues. With its dense green cover, undulating terrain, hillocks, and stream courses, the region harbours habitats for diverse flora and fauna.

== Demography ==
According to 2011 Census of India, Kapsi had a total population of 4,179.

Bade Kapsi had a population of 1129 with 14.70% of the population under six years of age. The sex ratio was 1034 females per 1,000 males. Male literacy was 64.63% and female literacy was 51.64%. The effective literacy rate was 58.05%, which was lower than the Chhattisgarh state average of 70.28%.

Chhote Kapsi had a population of 3050 with 11.54% of the population under six years of age. The sex ratio was 992 females per 1,000 males. Male literacy was 88.54% and female literacy was 79.27%. The effective literacy rate was 83.91%, which was higher than the Chhattisgarh state average of 70.28%.

== Government and politics ==
=== Administration ===
From the administrative perspective, Kapsi is divided into two independent gram panchayats (village councils) namely:

1. Bade Kapsi: It lies to the east of the Devda ravine and covers an area of 7.55 square kilometres (2.92 sq mi). It is often referred to as Purana Kapsi in maps published by the Geological Survey of India.
2. Chhote Kapsi: It lies to the west of the Devda ravine and covers an area of 4.36 square kilometres (1.68 sq mi). It is often referred to as Naya Kapsi in maps published by the GSI.

Both the gram panchayats fall under the administrative jurisdiction of the Koyalibeda Janapad Panchayat.

=== Sansad Adarsh Gram Yojana ===
Chhote Kapsi was the first village in the Kanker parliamentary constituency to be identified for development under the ambitious Sansad Adarsh Gram Yojana of the Government of India. The inaugural ceremony was flagged off at a public event on 27 March 2015, by then Lok Sabha Member of Parliament (MP) Vikram Usendi, in presence of government officials and public representatives from the district. The primary objective of the scheme is to develop model villages to provide better standards of living and quality of life for inclusive growth of the rural population through improved basic amenities, better livelihood opportunities, enriched social capital, etc.

However, after the initial fanfare the scheme failed to achieve its declared objectives in the development of the village due to apathy, poor planning and lack of funds.

=== Shyama Prasad Mukherjee Rurban Mission ===
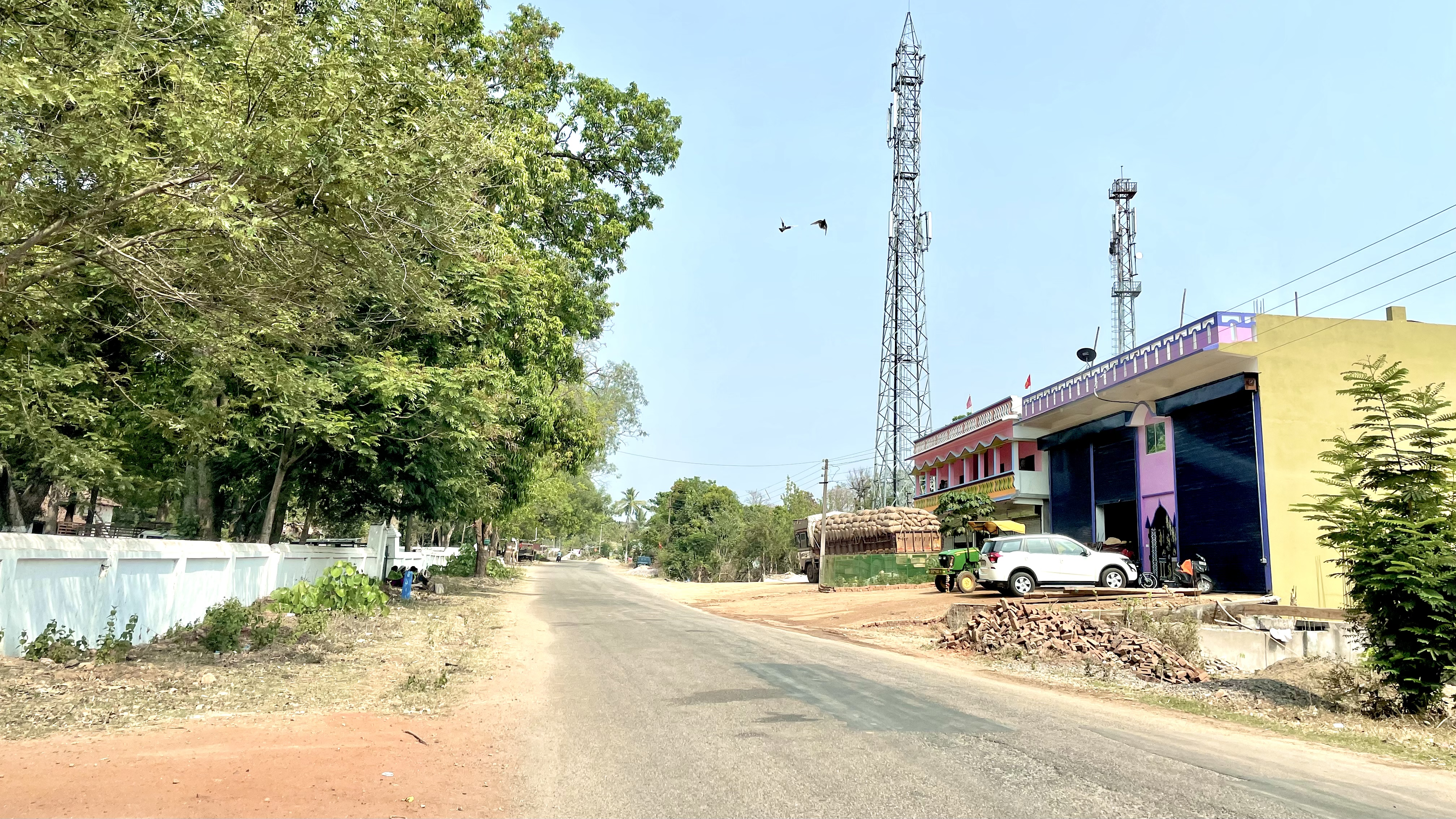
Tree-lined avenue in front of Forest Colony, Bade Kapsi

Under the Shyama Prasad Mukherjee Rurban Mission, also known as the National Rurban Mission (NRuM), Bade Kapsi has been identified as a tribal cluster and one of the 300 Rurban clusters across the country aimed at making the rural areas socially, economically and physically sustainable regions. The integrated cluster action plan (ICAP) for the cluster was approved by the Govt. of India in 2018 under the phase II of NRuM.

The Bade Kapsi Rurban Cluster comprises five gram panchayats, which together consist of several geographically contiguous villages.

Villages under Bade Kapsi Planning Area and Rurban Cluster
Bade Kapsi Planning Area	Bade Kapsi Rurban Cluster	Gram Panchayat	Village
Bade Kapsi Planning Area	Bade Kapsi Rurban Cluster	Aalor	Aalor
Bade Kapsi Planning Area	Bade Kapsi Rurban Cluster	Aalor	Vishrampur
Bade Kapsi Planning Area	Bade Kapsi Rurban Cluster	Bade Kapsi	Bade Kapsi
Bade Kapsi Planning Area	Bade Kapsi Rurban Cluster	Bapunagar	Bapunagar
Bade Kapsi Planning Area	Bade Kapsi Rurban Cluster	Chhote Kapsi	Chhote Kapsi
Bade Kapsi Planning Area	Bade Kapsi Rurban Cluster	Chhote Kapsi	Ballabhnagar
Bade Kapsi Planning Area	Bade Kapsi Rurban Cluster	Harangarh	Devipur
Bade Kapsi Planning Area	Bade Kapsi Rurban Cluster	Harangarh	Donde
Bade Kapsi Planning Area	Bade Kapsi Rurban Cluster	Harangarh	Harangarh
Bade Kapsi Planning Area		Premnagar	Premnagar

=== Town and Country Planning ===
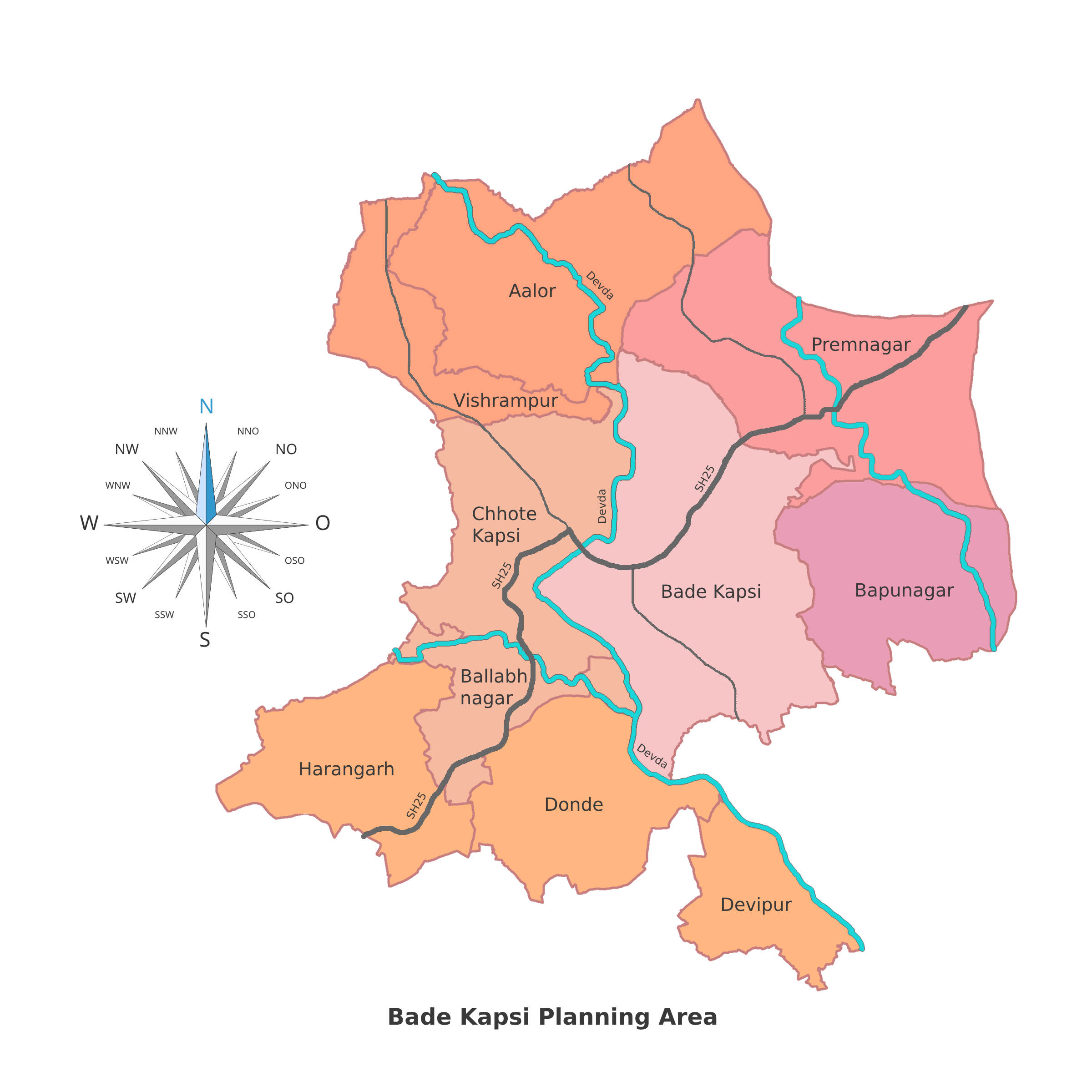
Map of Bade Kapsi Planning Area

In order to regulate the development of land and its use in the cluster and to achieve a planned and holistic development, the Directorate of Town and Country Planning of the Government of Chhattisgarh has established the Bade Kapsi Planning Area on 1 March 2017.

The planning area boundary comprises six gram panchayats — all five gram panchayats of the Bade Kapsi Rurban cluster with the addition of Premnagar gram panchayat to the northeast. The land use map, covering an area of 40.4 square kilometres (15.6 sq mi), was published and notified in the State Gazette on 28 September 2018.

=== Law and order ===
Kapsi falls under the jurisdiction of Pakhanjur police station, which is 11 km (6.8 mi) away. The other nearest police station is at Badgaon, 13 km (8.1 mi) away.

On 26 December 2024, the state police headquarters has issued a proposal for establishing a new police station at Kapsi in the financial year 2025-26.

=== Utilities ===
==== Electricity ====
The Chhattisgarh State Power Distribution Company Limited (CSPDCL) operates a feeder substation and distribution centre at Bade Kapsi, which supplies power to the locality and collects payments for electricity bills.

==== Telephone and internet ====
State owned Bharat Sanchar Nigam Limited (BSNL) provides wired landline, 2G/3G cellular telephony and fibre broadband internet services in Kapsi. Reliance Jio Infocomm Limited (Jio) has started providing 4G LTE cellular services since November 2021 and 5G services since July 2023. However, the quality of voice and internet services remain dismal from both the telecom service providers due to undercapacity and lack of investment in upgrading their infrastructure.

A non-functional cellular tower erected by the now defunct Reliance Communications Limited (RCOM) of the Anil Dhirubhai Ambani Group also exists. Both the BSNL and RCOM facilities were vandalised and set on fire by Maoist rebels in an attack in December 2008. The BSNL services were reinstated within a few weeks after the incident whereas the RCOM service remained suspended and was subsequently withdrawn.

=== Healthcare ===
Due insufficient healthcare facilities, the residents primarily rely on home-made remedies and quackery as the first response to medical needs. The government run Primary Health Centre (PHC) in the village is heavily understaffed and underequipped to provide any meaningful treatment even to the outpatients. A couple of privately run health facilities provide primary healthcare. Higher healthcare needs are referred to cities such as Dalli Rajhara, Dhamtari, Bhilai and Raipur.

== Economy ==
=== Agriculture ===
The economy of Kapsi is chiefly agrarian. Large scale cultivation of paddy and maize are undertaken throughout Rabi and Kharif crop seasons. Fish farming and dairy farming are other major primary sector activities practised by the populace. Under the aegis of Department of Fisheries, Govt. Of Chhattisgarh, the Bade Kapsi Rurban Cluster has become an important centre for pisciculture in the state, even exporting to the neighbouring states of Maharashtra and Odisha. Sericulture and horticulture are also gradually gaining ground, albeit practised by a few.

=== Forest produce ===
Forests play an important role in the lives of the people, providing food and livelihood by way of minor forest produce and employment as casual labour in the Forest department. They provide for consumer needs such fuel, firewood, medicines, food, beverages, and housing materials, among others.

=== Trade and commerce ===
Kapsi hosts a regular market that provides goods and services to the surrounding locality.

== Tourism ==
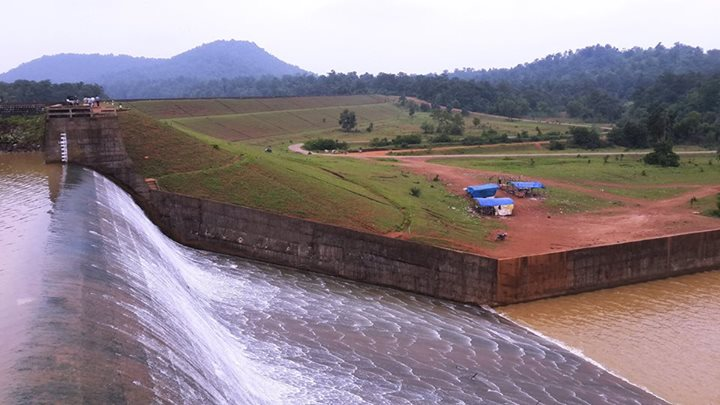
Spillway of Kherkatta Dam during monsoon

Kherkatta Dam, officially known as Paralkot Reservoir (Devanagari: परलकोट जलाशय) is a popular local tourist spot and the largest dam in the district. It is built across the Kotri River near the village of Kherkatta, 10 km (6.2 mi) northwest of Kapsi. The construction of this medium irrigation project began in 1966 and was completed in 1981 by the Dandakaranya Development Authority, over a period of 15 years.

During the monsoon rains, it sees a large influx of visitors from all over the district as well as from the neighbouring districts, especially when water spills-over from the 12 m (39 ft) high spillway. Despite repeated demands by the public for its beautification and development of recreational activities such as boating to attract more tourists round the year, it remains devoid of even the basic amenities.

== Transport ==
=== Road ===
Kapsi is on Chhattisgarh State Highway 25 and is served only by road transport.

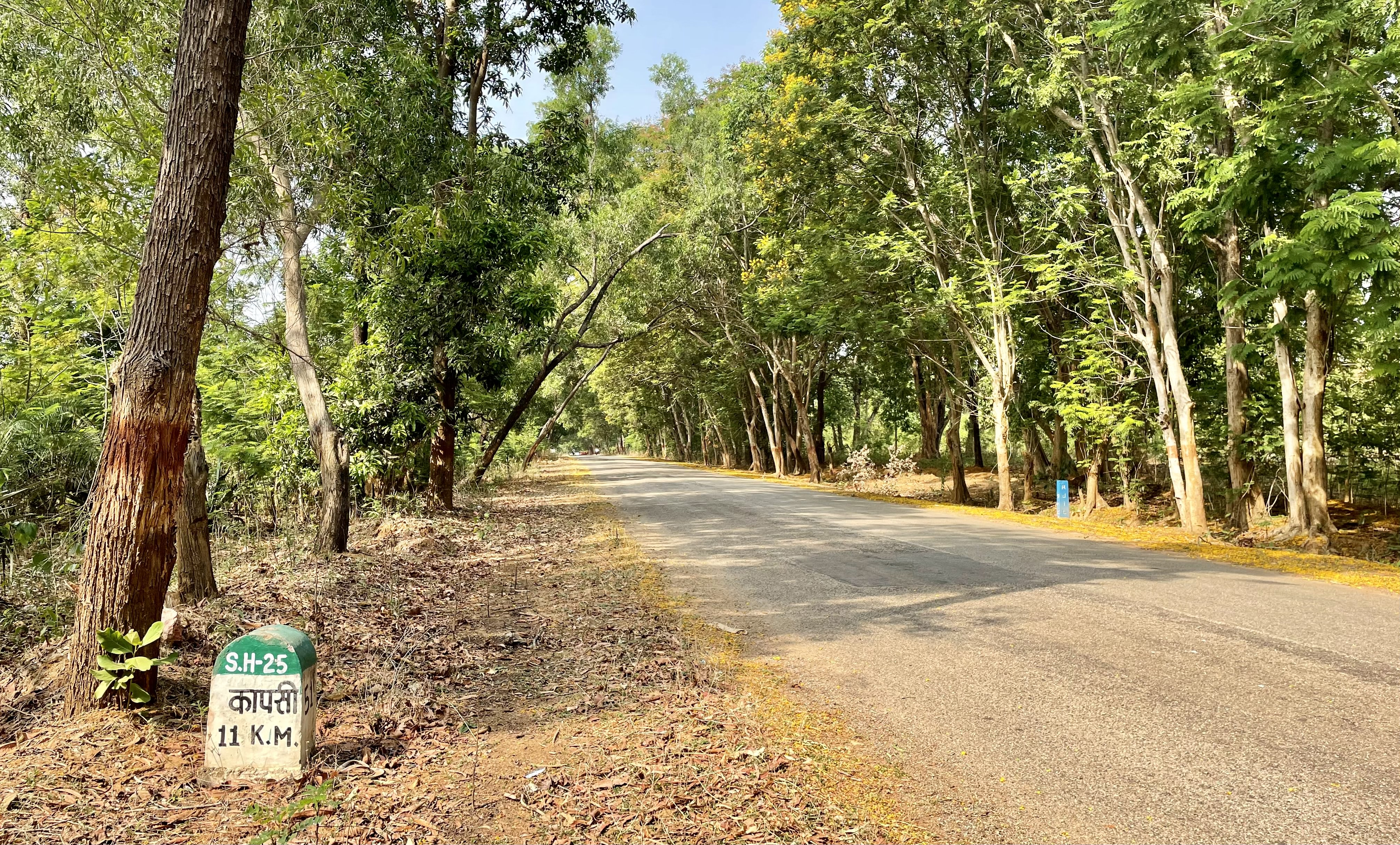
Badgaon-Kapsi section on Chhattisgarh State Highway 25

=== Rail ===
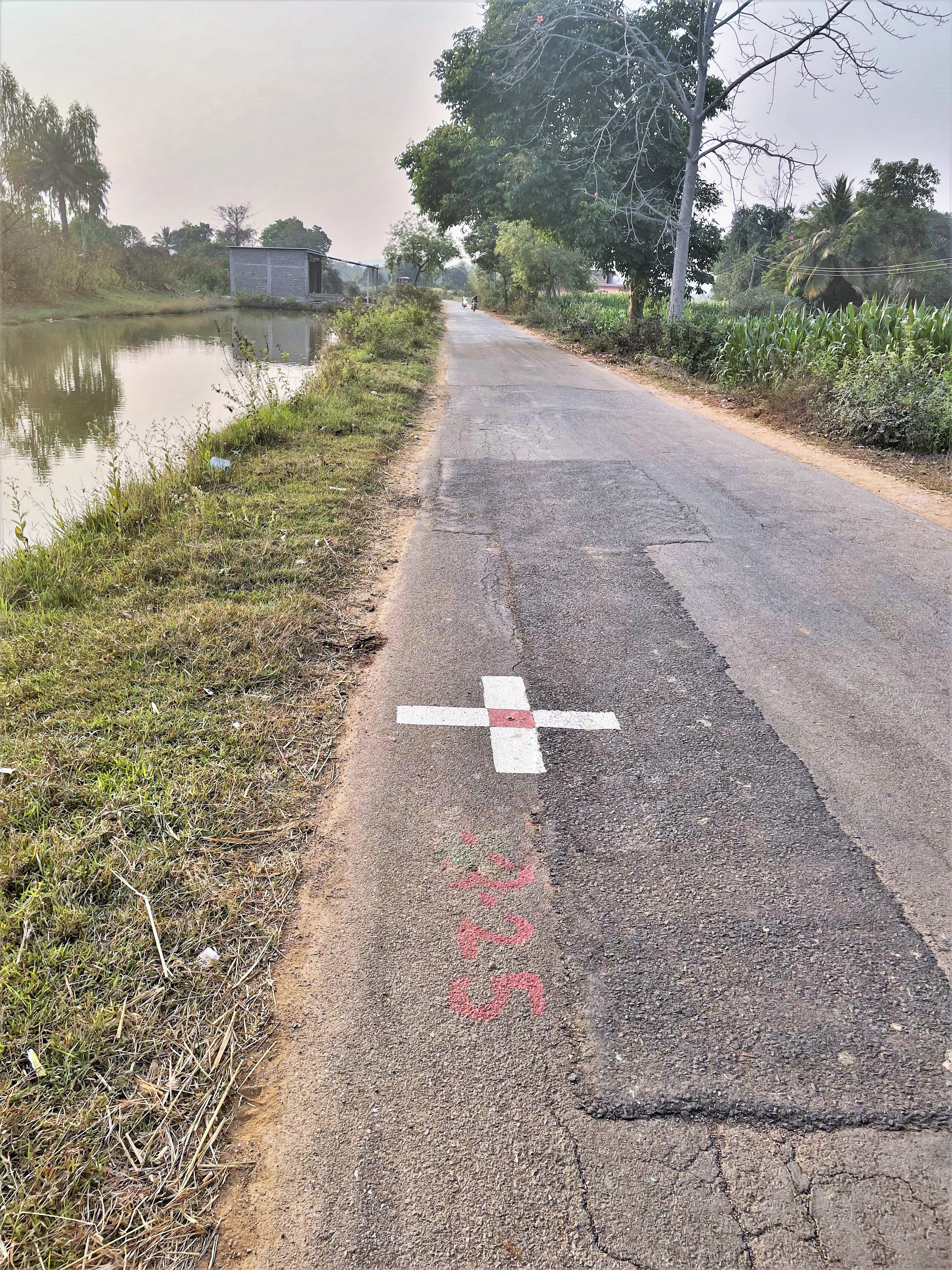
Imprints of the final location survey of Gadchiroli-Bhanupratappur rail line near New Colony in Kapsi

Kapsi is not connected to the network of Indian Railways. The nearest local railway station is Keoti (KETI), 50 km (31 mi) from Kapsi, on the Dalli Rajhara–Jagdalpur line.

There have been proposals to build the proposed Gadchiroli-Bhanupratappur rail line via Durgukondal, Kapsi and Pakhanjur instead of via Manpur.

In May 2022, the Ministry of Railways (India) provided an in-principle approval for the survey of this line. Subsequently it allocated ₹3.37 crore (US$350,000) for the survey. The South Eastern Central Railway zone fast-tracked the regulatory process and in August of the same year floated tenders for the final location survey and preparation of the Detailed Project Report.

== Human-wildlife conflict ==
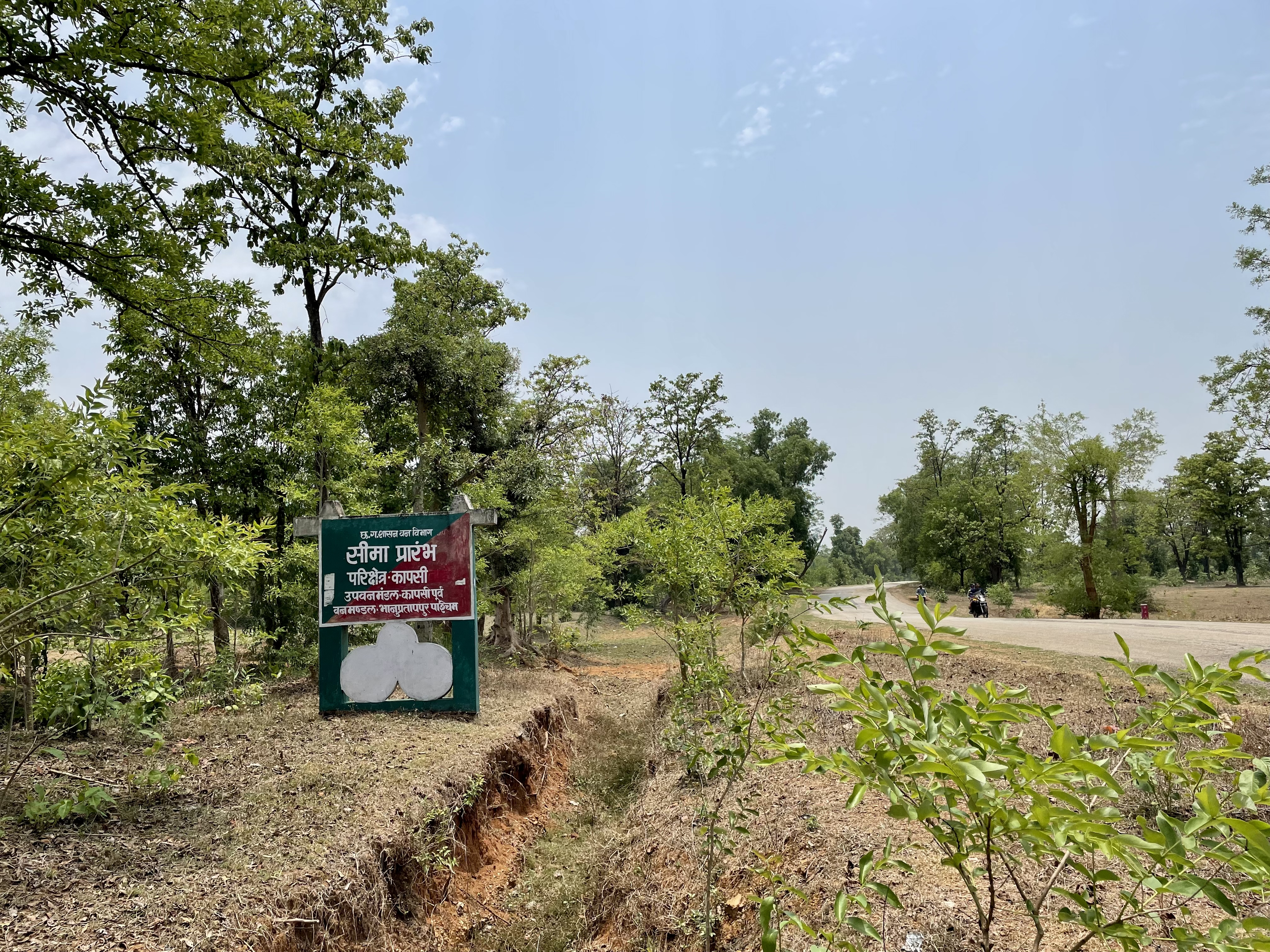
Signboard of Kapsi Forest Range on Chhattisgarh State Highway 25

Though instances of human-wildlife conflict in the region have been rare, a rapidly increasing human population contributing to high biodiversity interactions between people and wild animals are becoming more and more prevalent.

In July 2023, an adolescent wild elephant strayed from its group while traversing the forests and entered the residential areas of Kapsi, leading to chaos and panic for two days. Besides causing damage to several houses and crops in the neighbourhood, it trampled a man to death in the Silk Farm premises of Bade Kapsi despite efforts by the forest department officials to prevent conflict.

In June 2023, three persons belonging to Maharashtra were arrested from Matoli village by the Kapsi forest department officials for trying to smuggle a live Pangolin, whose market value was estimated at ₹15 lakh (US$16,000).
