= Nara Narayan Mela =

Nara Narayan Mela, also known as Pakhanjore Mela, is an annual mela in Paralkot (modern Pakhanjore) at Kanker district in Chhattisgarh. Nara Narayan Mela starts on Makar Sankranti and lasts for 8 to 10 days. Nearly 4 to5 million people gather here, from India and abroad. The business estimated to be worth millions. The followers of Swami Satyananda Paramahansa, who believed him to be incarnation of god, started this event. Originally it was celebrated only for one day on Makar Sankranti festival.

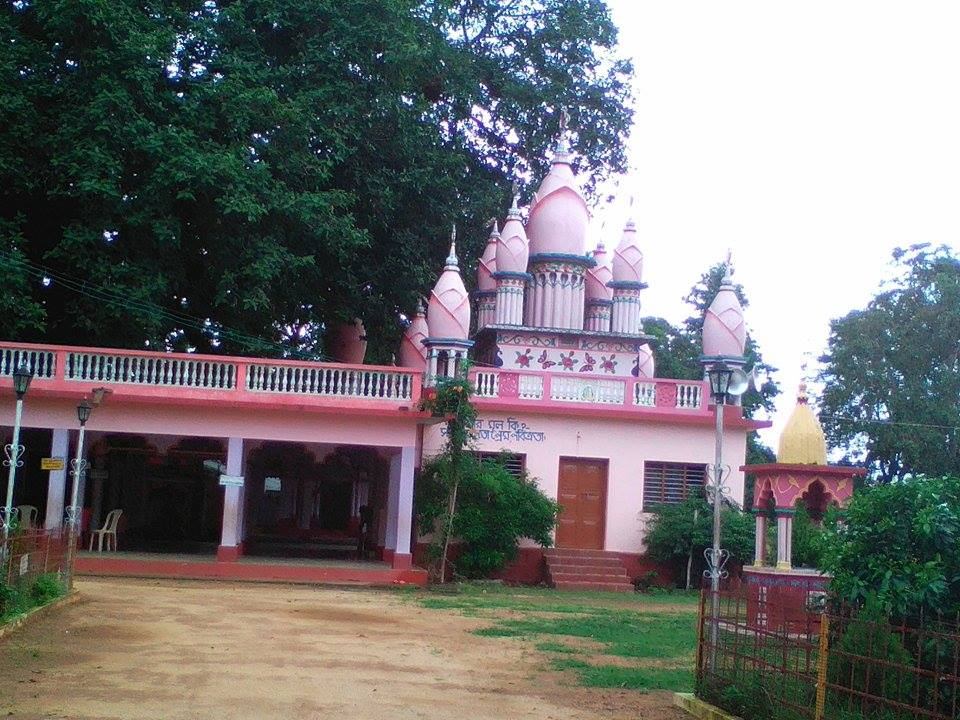
Nara Narayan Temple

== Satyananda Sevashram Sangha ==
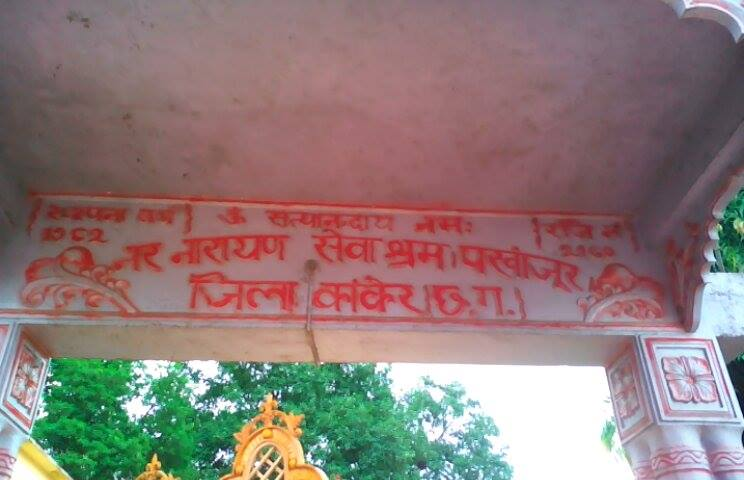
Gate Nara Narayan Ashram

Sreemat Swami Satyananda Paramhansadeb is the founder of Nara Narayan Sevasram and Satyananda Sevashram Sangha at Pakhanjore.

Swami Satyanand was born in Kalia, Faridpur District in Bangladesh (known as Bengal before partition of India). He had faith in god since childhood. He abandoned his family during his early youth and adopted the path of righteousness. Due to his propensity towards faith and his efficient preaching, a large number of students began to follow him. Swamiji's followers were from many parts of the country, and they started worshipping him as a messenger of god.

== First Ashram ==
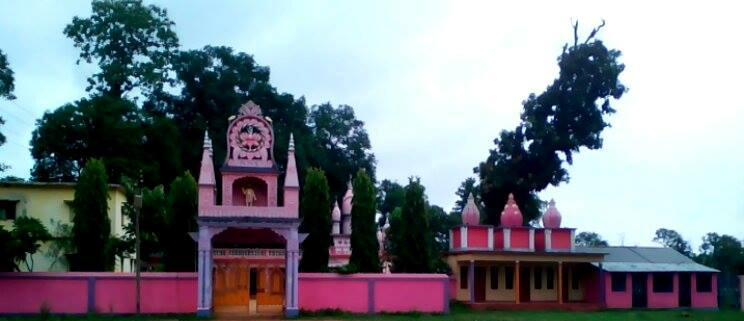
View of Ashram

Swami Satyananda sacrificed his home to build his first Ashram in Mathanbadhi at Bangladesh. While living with his disciple, he gave services to people for many years. After the 1947 partition of India Swami Satyananda along with his disciple came to India as refugees and settled at Paralkot (modern Pakhanjore). At Nara Narayan Sevsram in Pakhanjore he continued to serve people.

== Swamiji's mausoleum ==
Swami Satyananda sacrificed his physical life and gave service to people, and he delivered the service through Nara Narayan Sevagram. The local people believed him to be an incarnation of god. In 1974 Swamiji abandoned the land and took mausoleum. Today his mausoleum is the region's most magnificent temple. His divine body is placed in a special room below his statue.

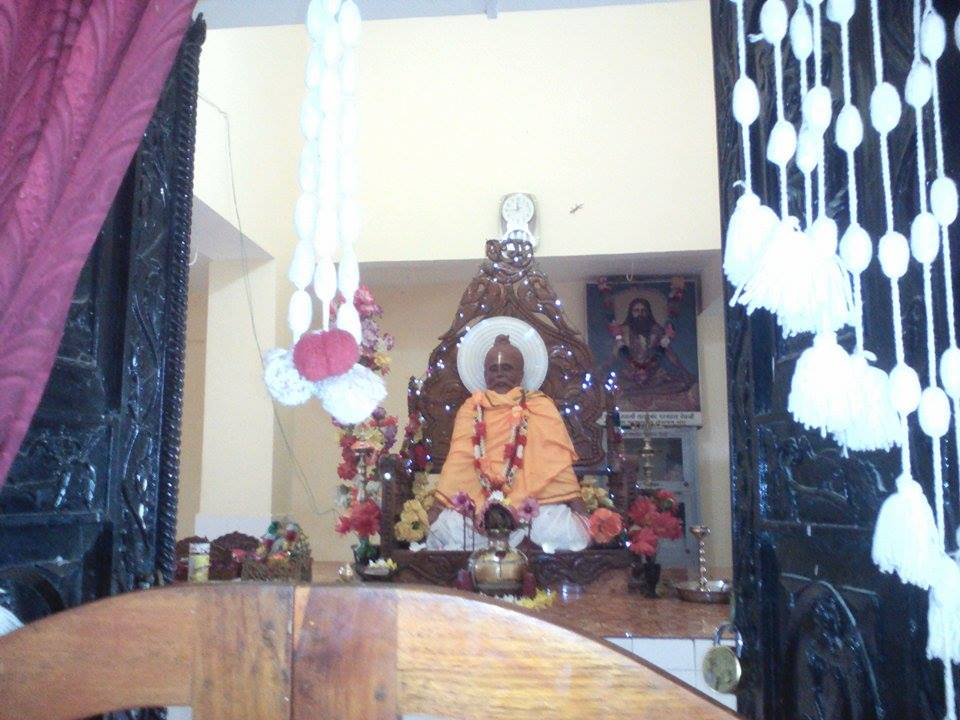
Swamiji's mausoleum

== First private higher secondary school ==
After the 1947 partition of India the people who came as refugees faced the biggest problem of the area: their children's education. Therefore, with the support of his disciples and Nara Nararyan Sevagram, Swami Satyananda established the first private higher secondary school for children of all religions. Registered in 1979, the school is now known as Satyananda Higher Secondary School.

== Theme of Pakhanjore Mela ==
In year 2023 to make the mela more attractive a theme song was made by Prasenjit Haldar (Jeet) .
