= Bhanupratappur =

- Town
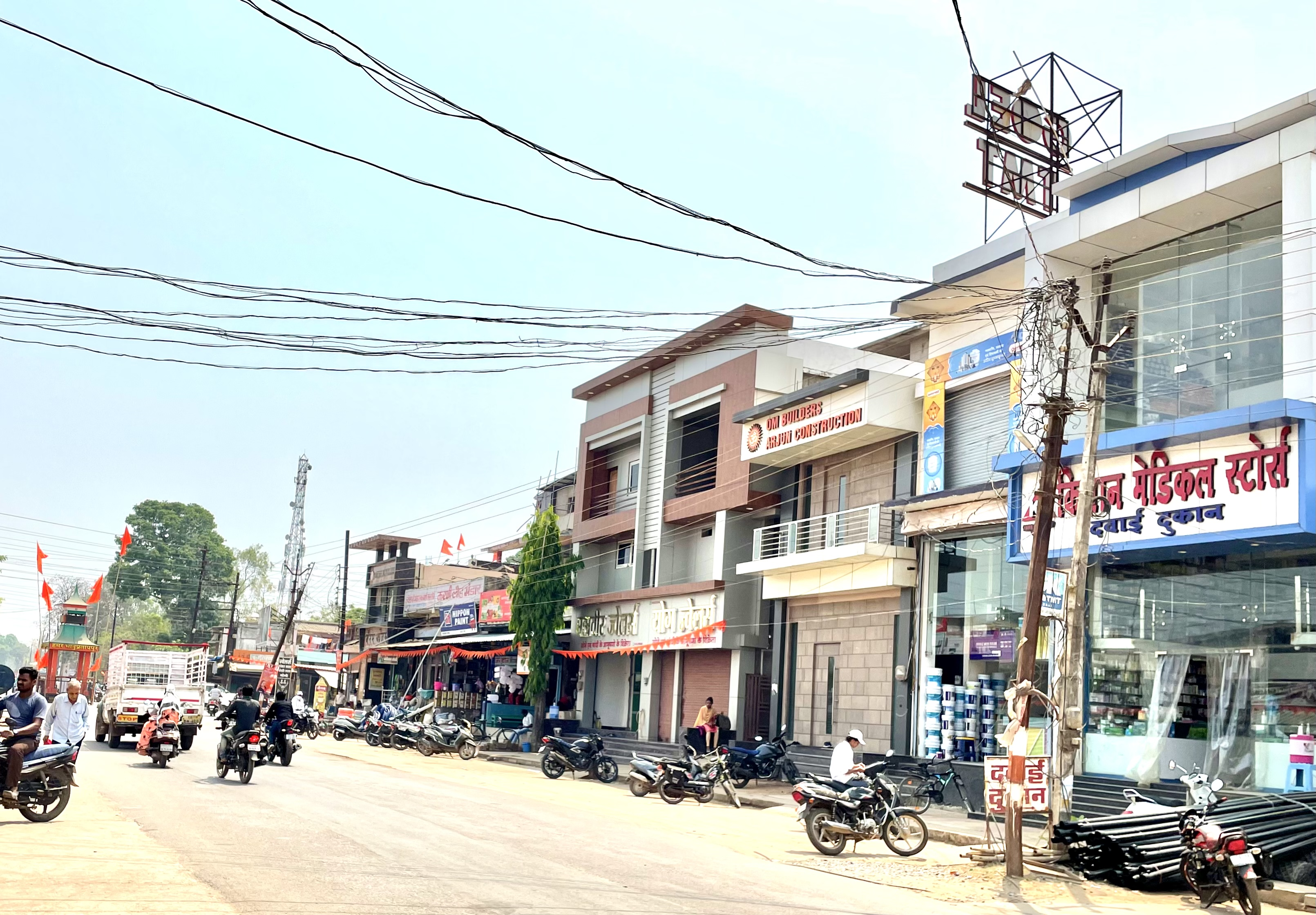
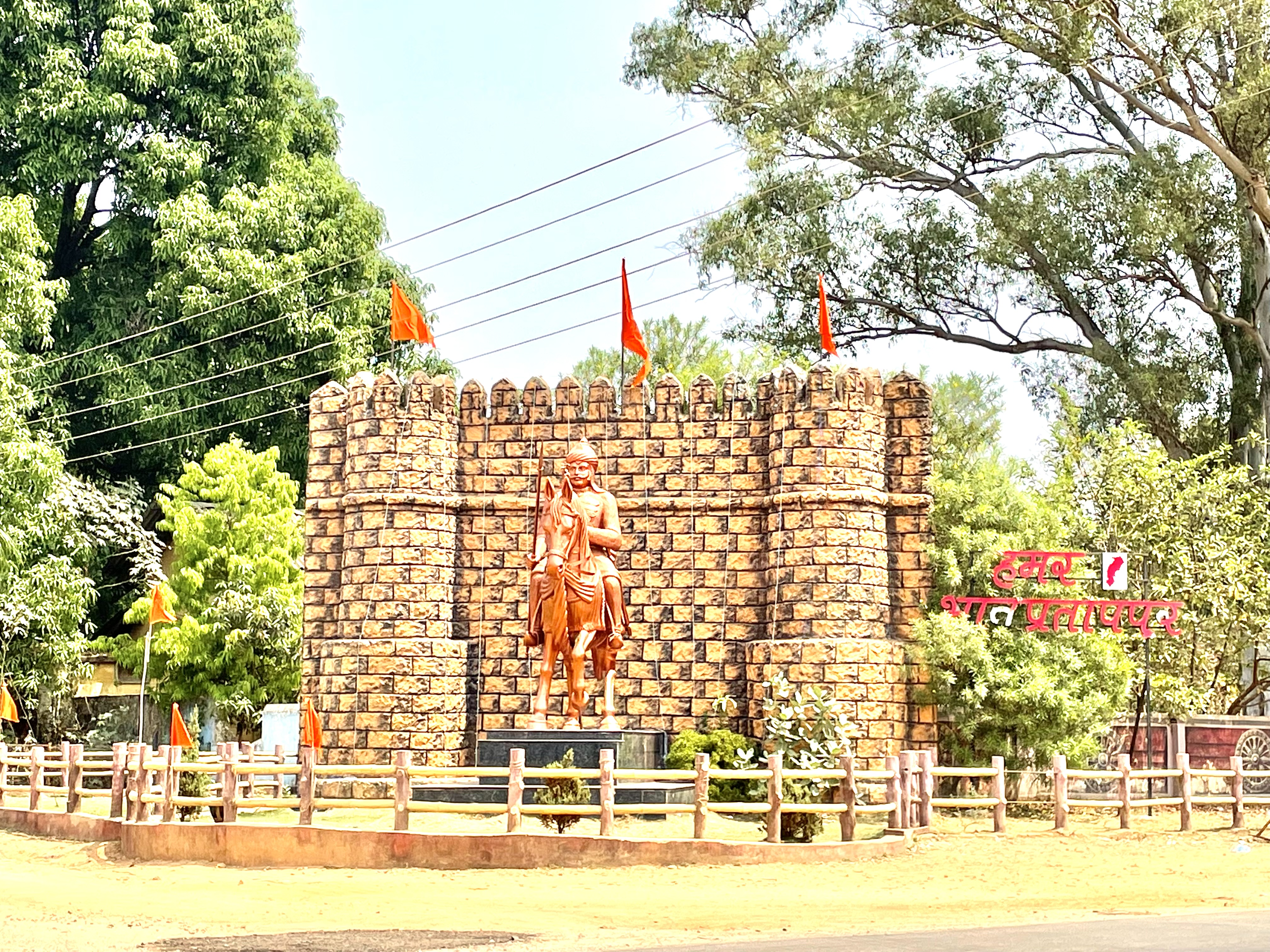
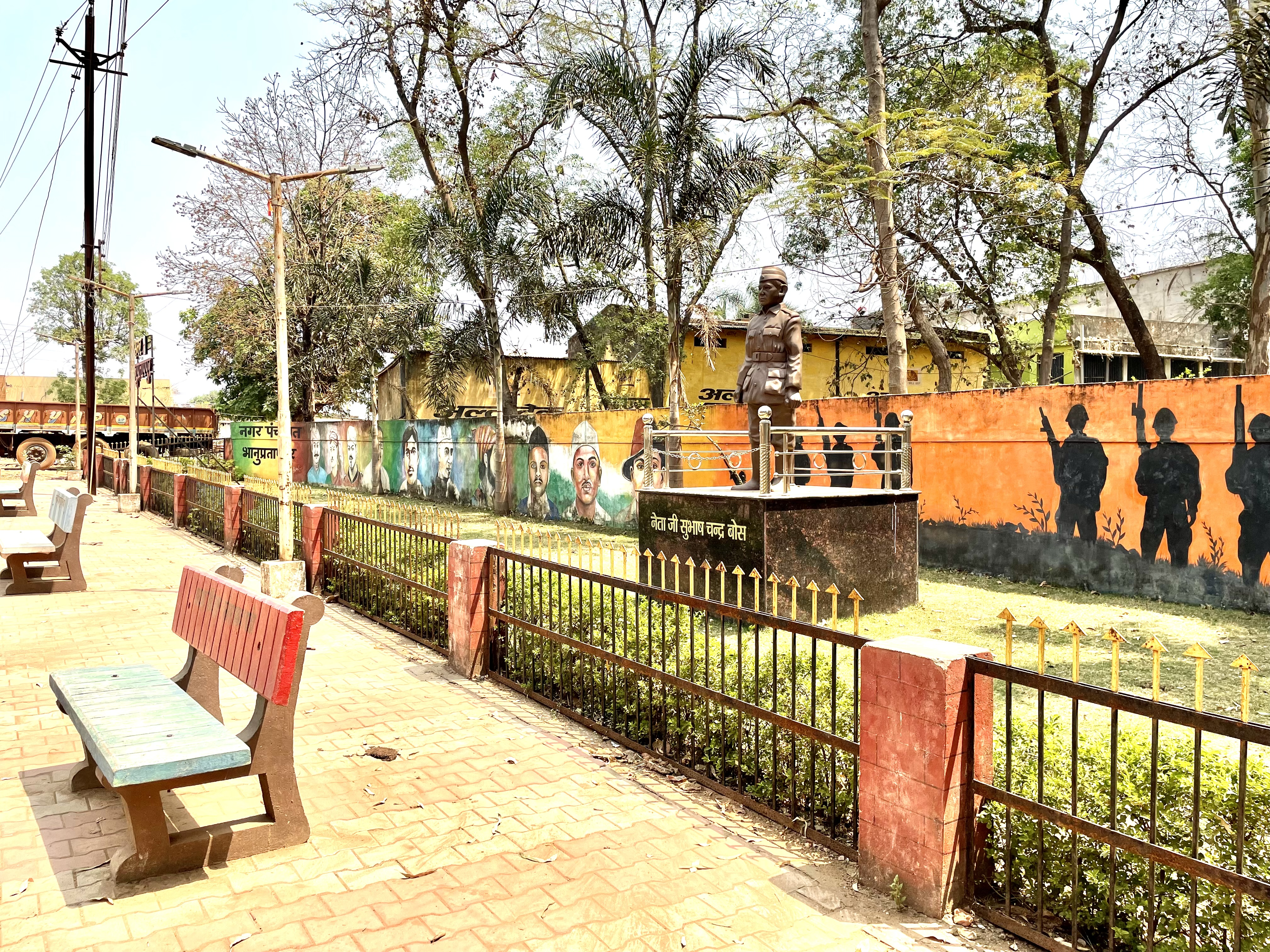
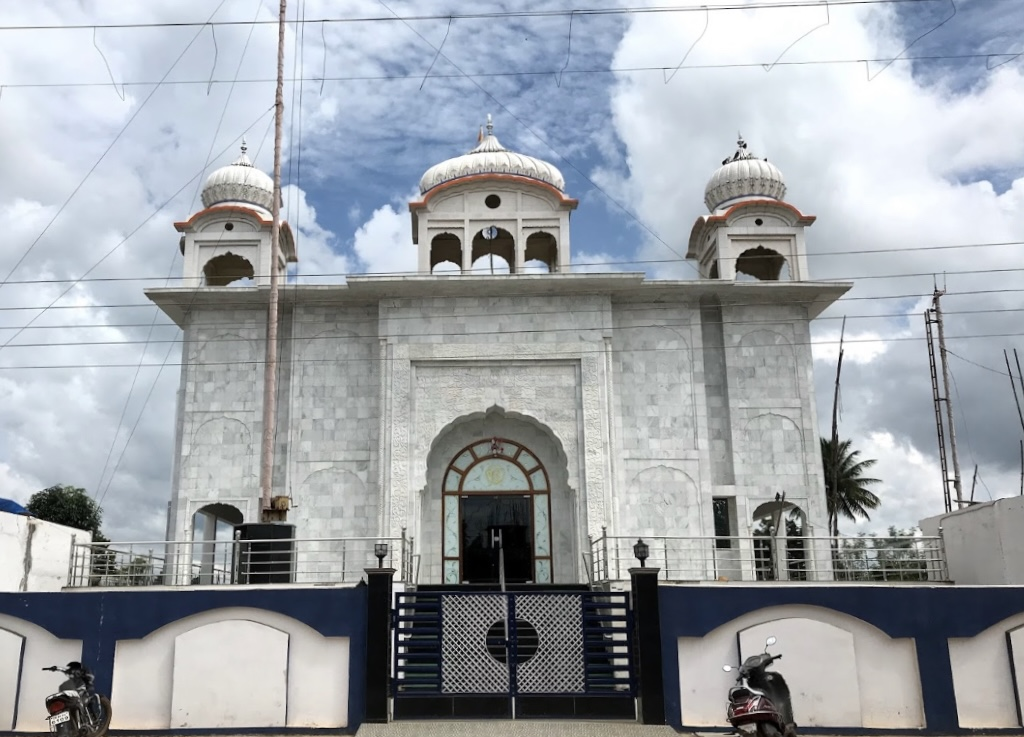
- From top: "Left to right" Downtown at Sambalpur Road, Maharana Pratap Chowk, Netaji Bose Path, Gurudwara
- Nickname: Gateway of Bastar
- Interactive map of Bhanupratappur
- Location in Chhattisgarh, India Bhanupratappur (India)
- Coordinates: 20.310079°N 81.071930°E
- Country: India
- State: Chhattisgarh
- District: Kanker

Government
  - Type: Notified Area Council
  - Body: Nagar Panchayat Bhanupratappur
  - Council President: Nikhil Singh Rathore (BJP)
  - Member of Legislative Assembly: Savitri Manoj Mandavi (INC)
  - Sub-Divisional Magistrate: Gangadhar Wahile
  - Additional Superintendent of Police: Akash Shrimal
  - Sub-Divisional Police Officer: Sher Bahadur Singh

Population (2011)
  - Total: 8,856

Languages
  - Official: Hindi, Halbi
- Time zone: UTC+5:30 (IST)
- PIN: 494 669
- Telephone code: +91 7850
- Vehicle registration: CG 19

Bhanupratappur is a town and a Notified Area Council in Kanker district in the Indian state of Chhattisgarh. It is the administrative headquarters of its eponymous development block, tehsil, and constituency of the Chhattisgarh Legislative Assembly. The town derives its name from King Bhanupratap Deo, the last ruler of erstwhile Kanker princely state.

== History ==
Maharaja Bhanupratap Deo was the final king of Kanker princely state, before India gained freedom. After Independence, he entered public service and was elected two times as a Member of the Legislative Assembly (MLA) from the Kanker constituency. A few years after his death in 1969, a village was established in his memory, named in his honour.

== Demographics ==
According to the 2011 Census, Bhanupratappur has a population of 8,856. Males constitute 49.7% (4401) of the population whereas females constitute 50.3% (4455). The sex ratio is 1012 females per 1000 males, higher than the national average of 940 per 1000. Children below 6 years of age constitute 10.87% of the population with child sex ratio at 941 males per 1000 females.

The effective literacy rate is 90.47%; male literacy rate being 95.48% and female literacy rate being 84.97%, significantly higher than the national average of 73%.

Hindus comprise the majority with 87.84% of the population. Muslims comprise 4.3%, Sikhs 2.13%, Christians 1.42%, Jains 1.02%, and Buddhists 0.79%. Of the population, 2.50% did not identify themselves with any religion, whereas 0.01% did not want to reveal their religion.

== Transportation ==
=== Roadways ===
Bhanupratappur is situated at the intersection of two major Chhattisgarh State Highways SH 5 (Shahdol-Rajnandgaon-Bhadrachalam) and SH 6 (Khariyar-Kanker-Gadchiroli), which cross at Maharajadhiraj Bhanupratap Deo Chowk in the heart of the town. It also links to SH 25 (Bhanupratappur-Durgukondal-Kapsi-Pakhanjur) via SH 5 at Keoti, 10 km (6.2 mi) south of Bhanupratappur. Being an important transit stop in the region, it is well connected to all major towns and cities in the state by regular bus service.

=== Railways ===
Bhanupratappur was connected to the Indian Railway network on 14 April 2018 as part of the Dalli Rajhara–Jagdalpur line of South East Central Railway zone. The DEMU train to Raipur was flagged off by the Prime Minister Narendra Modi. The railway line has established direct rail connectivity between Bhanupratappur and the state capital, Raipur (150 km away), as well as the industrial town of Bhilai (120 km away).

=== Air transport ===
The nearest airport is Swami Vivekananda Airport in Raipur, around 150 km away by road.
