= Gudum railway station =

Railway station in Chhattisgarh

Gudum

General information
- Location: Gudum, Chhattisgarh; India
- Coordinates: 20.4384°N 81.0855°E
- Elevation: 385 metres (1,263 ft)
- System: Indian Railways station
- Owner: Indian Railways
- Operator: South East Central Railway
- Platforms: 2
- Tracks: 4 (Single Diesel BG)
- Connections: Auto stand

Construction
- Structure type: Standard (on-ground station)
- Parking: No
- Cycle facilities: No

Other information
- Status: Functioning
- Station code: GUDM
- Zone(s): South East Central Railway
- Division(s): Raipur
Location

Gudum Railway Station is a small railway station in Balod district, Chhattisgarh. Its code is GUDM. It serves Gudum town. The station consists of two platforms. The platforms are not well sheltered. It lacks many facilities including water and sanitation.

== Major trains ==
Some of the important trains that runs from Gudum are:

- Raipur–Gudum DEMU
