= Dalli Rajhara–Jagdalpur line =

Railway route in India

Overview
- Status: Under construction (Completed till Tadoki)
- Owner: Indian Railways
- Termini: Dalli-Rajhara; Jagdalpur

Technical
- Line length: 235 km (146 mi)
- Electrification: Ongoing
- Operating speed: 130 km/h (81 mph)

Dalli Rajhara–Jagdalpur rail line, is an under-construction 228.51 kilometres (141.99 mi) long broad-gauge railway track in Chhattisgarh state of India connecting existing railways stations at Dalli Rajhara (on Dalli Rajhara-Durg-Raipur line) in north to Jagdalpur (Kothavalasa–Jagdalpur-Kirandul line) in South.

== History ==
The catalyst for the construction of this rail track were the Rowghat Mines, aimed to provide iron ore supply to NMDC's Nagarnar Steel Plant near Raipur. Since the development of Rowghat Mines saw various delays, resulting in corresponding delays in the construction of this rail line.

=== Rowaghat mines ===
In 1983, the Steel Authority of India Limited (SAIL) made the application for development Rowghat mines, and the Ministry of Environment and Forests (MoEF) granted in principle environmental clearance only in 1996 after a delay of 13 years. In 1998, an Memorandum of Understanding (MoU) among Railway, Madhya Pradesh State Government (from which Chhattisgarh state was later formed on 1 November 2000), National Mineral Development Corporation (NMDC) and SAIL was signed for the construction. Following a 2004 request by MoEF to the submit fresh application for forestry and environment clearance for the Rowaghat Mines, SAIL submitted the revised application to MoeF in 2007, which referred it to the Supreme Court in 2007, and in 2008 the Supreme Court granted the final consent for forestry clearance of Rowghat Mines. In October 2009, mining lease for F Block of Rowghat Mines was granted to SAIL for a period of 20 years, this provided the impetus for the Dalli Rajhara-Jagdalpur line also.

=== Naxal insurgency ===
Project, after facing many years of procedural and clearance related hurdles, also faced stiff resistance and opposition from Naxalite–Maoist insurgents, who fear that the construction of the rail track will speed up the economic development thereby eradicating the insurgency from the region. Since 2014, 2 Battalions (28th & 33rd) of Sashastra Seema Bal (SSB) have been deployed in the Balod and Kanker district of Chhattisgarh to provide protection for the construction of Dalli Rajhara to Rowghat railway lines of 95 km. In February 2016 and May 2017, two troopers of Sashastra Seema Bal (SSB) were injured after an improvised explosive device (IED) planted by Maoists went off in the project area.

== Details ==
=== Significance ===
Dalli Rajhara–Jagdalpur rail line, in addition to catering to the passenger and goods transport, will also supply iron ore from the Rowghat Mines to SAIL's Bhilai Steel Plant and also to Nagarnar Steel Plant near Jagdalpur. Jagdalpur, about 300 km by road from Raipur, has no direct rail connectivity, and a 622 km circuitous rail route from Jagdalpur to Raipur is via Koraput and Rayagada in Orissa which takes about 16 hours. Dalli Rajhara–Jagdalpur rail line will shorten the distance between Raipur to Jagdalpur to 346.80 kilometres (215.49 mi) which will take just 6 hrs 30 mins to travel.

=== Construction ===
Construction is being undertaken in the following two phases:

- Phase-1 Dalli Rajhara-Rowghat Mines, 94.66 kilometres (58.82 mi), constructed by RVNL (Rail Vikas Nigam Ltd). Dalli Rajhara-Gudum-Bhanupratapur was completed in 2018, Bhanupratappur-Keoti in 27 Mar 2019, Keoti-Antagarh in August 2020, Antagarh-Tadoki in Aug 2023.
- Phase-2 Rowaghat-Jagdalpur, 133.85 kilometres (83.17 mi), constructed by IRCON (Indian Railway Construction Organisation).

== Route ==
=== Dalli-Rajhara-Rowaghat section ===
- Durg district
  - Dalli-Rajhara railway station 0.0 kilometres (0 mi), existing railway station.
- Kanker district
  - Salhaitola 11.68 kilometres (7.26 mi)
  - Gudum 17.08 kilometres (10.61 mi) (near Dondi)
  - Bhanupratappur 33.76 kilometres (20.98 mi)
  - Keoti 42.14 kilometres (26.18 mi)
  - Antagarh 59.24 kilometres (36.81 mi)
  - Taroki/Tadoki/Tadokee 76.66 kilometres (47.63 mi)
  - Rowghat 94.66 kilometres (58.82 mi)

=== Rowaghat-Jagdalpur section ===
This section has the following 13 stations:

- Kanker district
  - Rowghat
- Narayanpur district
  - Narayanpur
- Kondagaon district
  - Chandganv
  - Barnda / Baranda
  - Jugani
  - Kondagaon
  - Baniyagaon
  - Dhikonga / Dahikonga
  - Bhanpuri
- Bastar district
  - Sonarpal
  - Bastar
  - Kudkanar
  - Jagdalpur railway station, existing station at Jagdalpur, the administrative head office of Bastar district.

== Current status ==
- 2023 Aug: Phase-1 Dalli Rajhara-Tadoki section completed and trains became operational, Tadoki-Rowghat section was under-construction.
- 2025 May: Phase-2 Rowghat-Jagdalpur section, costing INR3,513 was approved by the railway minister. Survey was already complete in 2018, and Detailed Project Report (DPR) was commissioned.

== See also ==
- Nagpur Chhattisgarh Railway
