= Forest range =

Forest administration in India

A forest range is a term used to define administrative regions containing one or more (usually) demarcated and (usually) protected or resource-managed forests. The term was in use in British India, and hence India, Pakistan and Bangladesh use this term for administrative purposes.

== In India ==
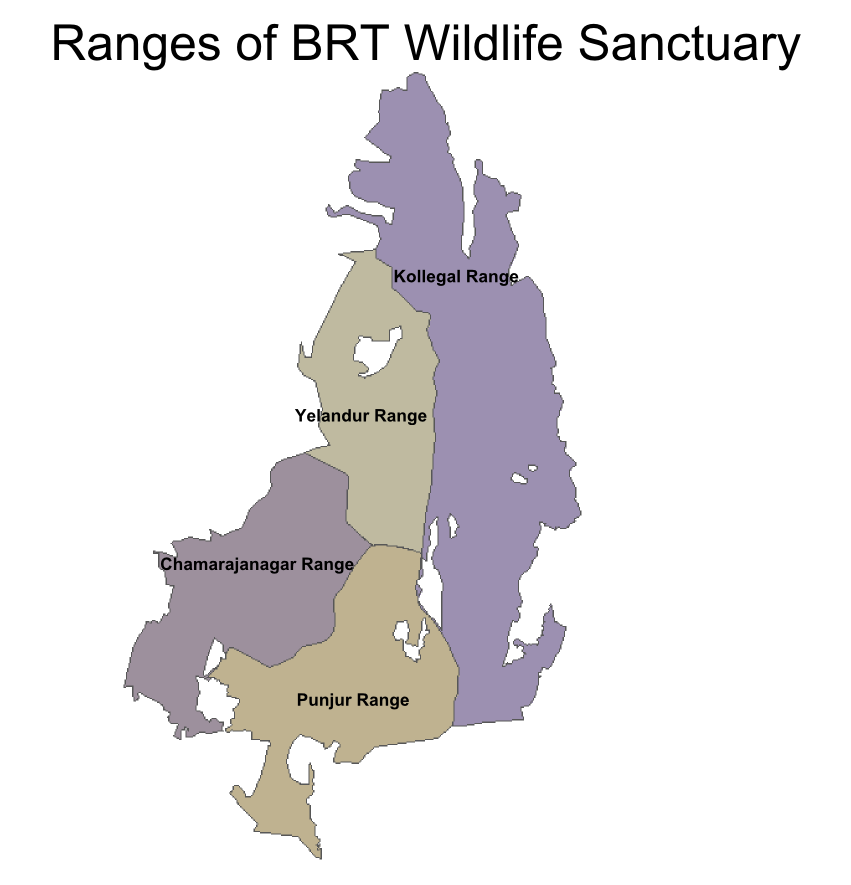
Map of the Biligiriranga Swamy Temple Wildlife Sanctuary in South India with the Forest Range boundaries marked. Note that all the ranges are in the same district of Chamarajanagar and the range boundaries may or may not correspond to taluka boundaries

In India, the combined forests in a forest division are completely divided into non-overlapping forest ranges for the purpose of administration and coordination, in an analogous form of dividing the political area of a subdivision into blocks. Alignment of the ranges to political boundaries is not necessary, as forests often overlap political boundaries - but one range cannot span more than one state.

Each range controls the protected areas and managed resources under its jurisdiction, and is presided over by a Forest Range Officer. A forest range may be broken up into one or more 'sub-ranges' or 'blocks'. Each forest range has many forest beats within its jurisdictional area.
