= Dalli Rajhara =

- Town
- Nickname: Dalli
- Location in Chhattisgarh, India Dalli Rajhara (India)
- Coordinates: 20.58°N 81.08°E
- Country: India
- State: Chhattisgarh
- District: Balod
- Founder: Bhilai Steel Plant

Government
  - Type: Municipality
  - Body: Nagar Palika Parishad, Dalli Rajhara

Area
  - Total: 17.12 km^{2} (6.61 sq mi)
- Elevation: 409 m (1,342 ft)

Population (2011)
  - Total: 44,363
  - Density: 2,591/km^{2} (6,711/sq mi)

Languages
  - Official: Hindi
  - Other: Chhattisgarhi
- Time zone: UTC+5:30 (IST)
- PIN: 491228
- Telephone code: 07748
- Vehicle registration: CG 24

Dalli-Rajhara is a town and a municipality in Balod district in the state of Chhattisgarh, India. Dalli Rajhara is home of iron ore captive mines for Bhilai Steel Plant, the largest integrated steel plant in India. Dalli mines deposit was discovered by Pramatha Nath Bose, the first Indian graded officer of the Geological Survey of India around 1900.

== Geography ==
Dalli Rajhara is located at 20.58°N 81.08°E. It has an average elevation of 409 m (1,342 ft).

== Demographics ==
As of the census of India 2011 population of Dalli Rajhara is 44,363. It has just 11,018 Households including House-less which shows declining trend of population.

As of the 2001 India census, Dalli-Rajhara had a population of 50,615. Males constitute 52% of the population and females 48%. Dalli-Rajhara has an average literacy rate of 68%, higher than the national average of 59.5%. Male literacy is 77% and, female literacy is 58%. In Dalli-Rajhara, 14% of the population is under 6 years of age.

Census Year	Population	Growth Rate	Sex Ratio
1961	23,346	-	-
1971	26,657	14.2	-
1981	55,307	107.48	-
1991	55,996	1.25	916
2001	50,884	1.9	945
2011	44,363	22.25	996

== Mining township ==
Dalli Rajhara

Dalli-Rajhara is the twin mine and part of the Rajhara group of mines. These are captive iron ore mines for Bhilai Steel Plant (BSP) – a SAIL enterprise. Iron ores mined from the area are of the hematite and magnetite variety. The other mines in the neighbourhood produce dolomite, lime and other raw materials which go into steel production.

Dalli-Rajhara is about 83 km south of Durg and comes under the south-eastern section of the Indian Railways. While both Dalli and Rajhara have mines, the residential area is predominantly in Rajhara. Dalli-Rajhara is a self-sufficient township with BSP having set up hospitals and a considerable number of educational institutes.

Dalli-Rajhara rose to prominence as a result of the labour rights movement in the 1970s.

The expert appraisal committee (EAC) of the ministry had met during the last three days to clear a shelf of stranded projects entailing an investment of nearly Rs 80,000 crore. The EAC has cleared 12 of these projects. The committee is expected to meet shortly again to take a call on the remaining projects. Among those cleared on Saturday are SAIL's proposed 1 million tonne per annum pellet plant along with upstream slime beneficiation facilities at its Dalli-Rajhara iron ore mine in Chhattisgarh.

== Transport ==
This area is connected via rail and road with its district balod. It is well connected by bus to the Durg and Bastar region. The road is in quite good shape. Only one passenger train runs between Dalli and Durg. Much development is due on the rail connectivity front. There is an ongoing rail link with Jagdalpur.

=== Extending rail transport ===
Union Railway Budget of 2012–13 has proposed new links to existing Durg-Dalli Rajhara railway line.

- Ongoing project of Dalli Rajhara–Rowghat–Jagdalpur. (Phase 1 first stretch Dalli Rajhara–Keoti work has been started).
- Extension of trains: 78816/78815 Dalli Rajhara–Durg DEMU to Raipur.
- New line surveys for extending proposed Dalli Rajhara railway line by constructing it up to Balod–Dhamtari.
- New line surveys for Dalli Rajhara–Chandrapur (Maharashtra) via Khadgaon, BharriTola and Manpur.
- New line surveys for linking Bhanupratappur with Dalli Rajhara–Rowghat under construction rail line and connecting it with Jagdalpur.

== Gallery ==
Rajhara Dam, Hanumanji

Rajhara Mine Area

Way to Kokan Pahadi

Hanuman Mandir, New Market

Gurudwara

Mines

== Notable people ==
- Pramatha Nath Bose
- Shankar Guha Niyogi
