= Kanker, Chhattisgarh =

Kanker
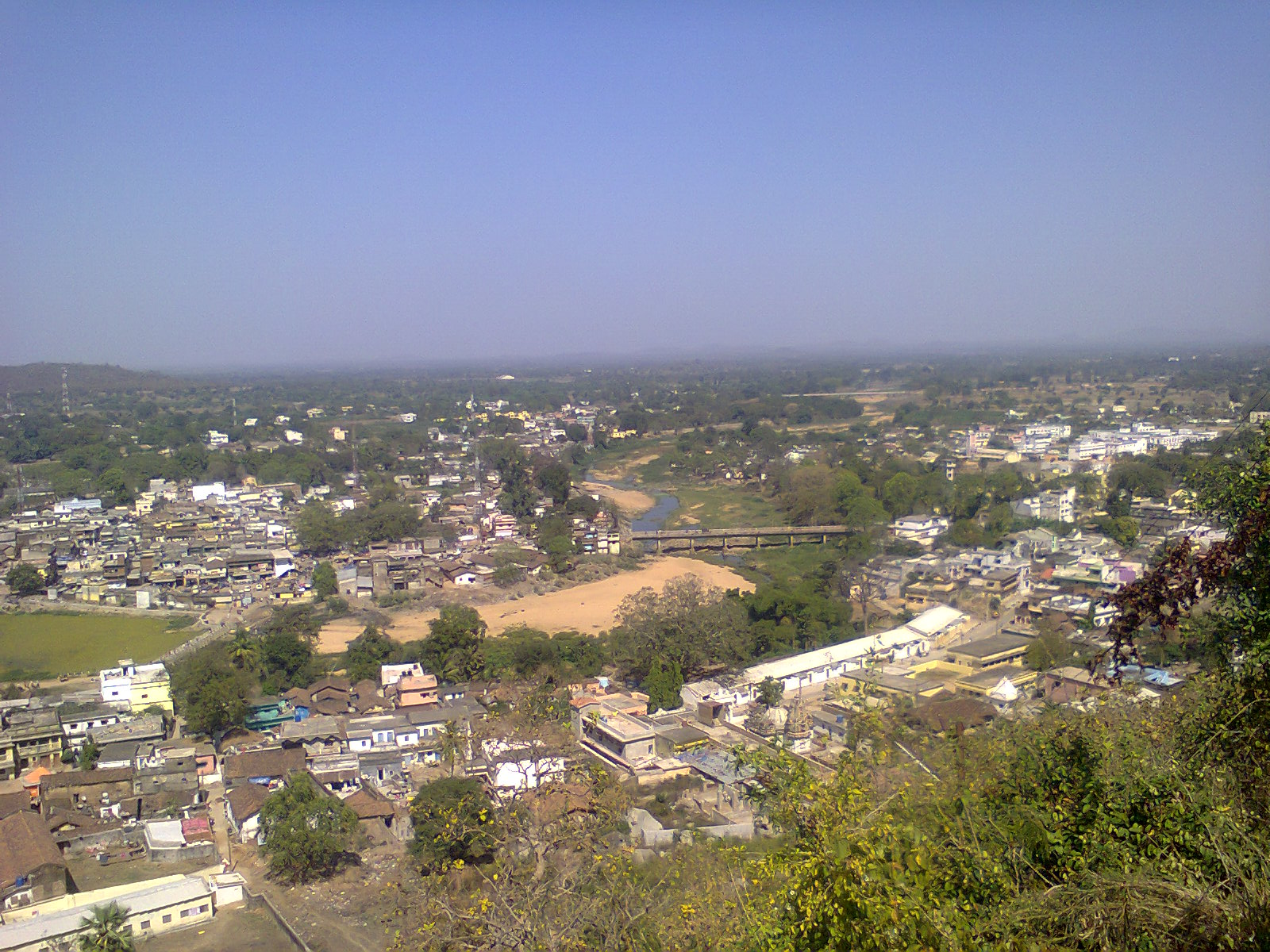
- Kanker town

- Location in Chhattisgarh, India
- Coordinates: 20.27°N 81.49°E
- Country: India
- State: Chhattisgarh
- District: Kanker
- Named for: Kank Rishi
- Elevation: 388 m (1,273 ft)

Population (2011)
  - Total: 41,500

Languages
  - Official: Hindi, Halbi,Chhattisgarhi
- Time zone: UTC+5:30 (IST)
- PIN: 494 334
- Telephone code: 91 7868
- Vehicle registration: CG 19

Kanker is a municipality and the headquarters of Kanker District, in the Indian state of Chhattisgarh. It is the second largest city of Bastar division after Jagdalpur.

== Geography ==
Kanker is located at 20.27°N 81.49°E. It has an average elevation of 388 metres (1272 feet).

== Demographics ==
As of the 2011 census, Kanker has a population of 51,385. Males are 51.6% of the population and females are 49.4%. The literacy rate is 77%, higher than the national average of 59.5%. Male literacy is 83% and female literacy is 71%. In Kanker, 12% of the population is less than 23 years old.

== Transport ==
Kanker is located on National Highway 30 (known as Raipur-Jagdalpur-Vizianagram Road) 140 km from the state capital Raipur and 160 km from the divisional headquarters Jagdalpur. Roads provide access to other parts of the state. Coaches operated by different private bus operators run at frequent intervals to major towns and cities of the state. A shared cab facility offers connection to neighbouring local routes. The nearest airport and major railway station is in Raipur.

== Gallery of places around Kanker ==
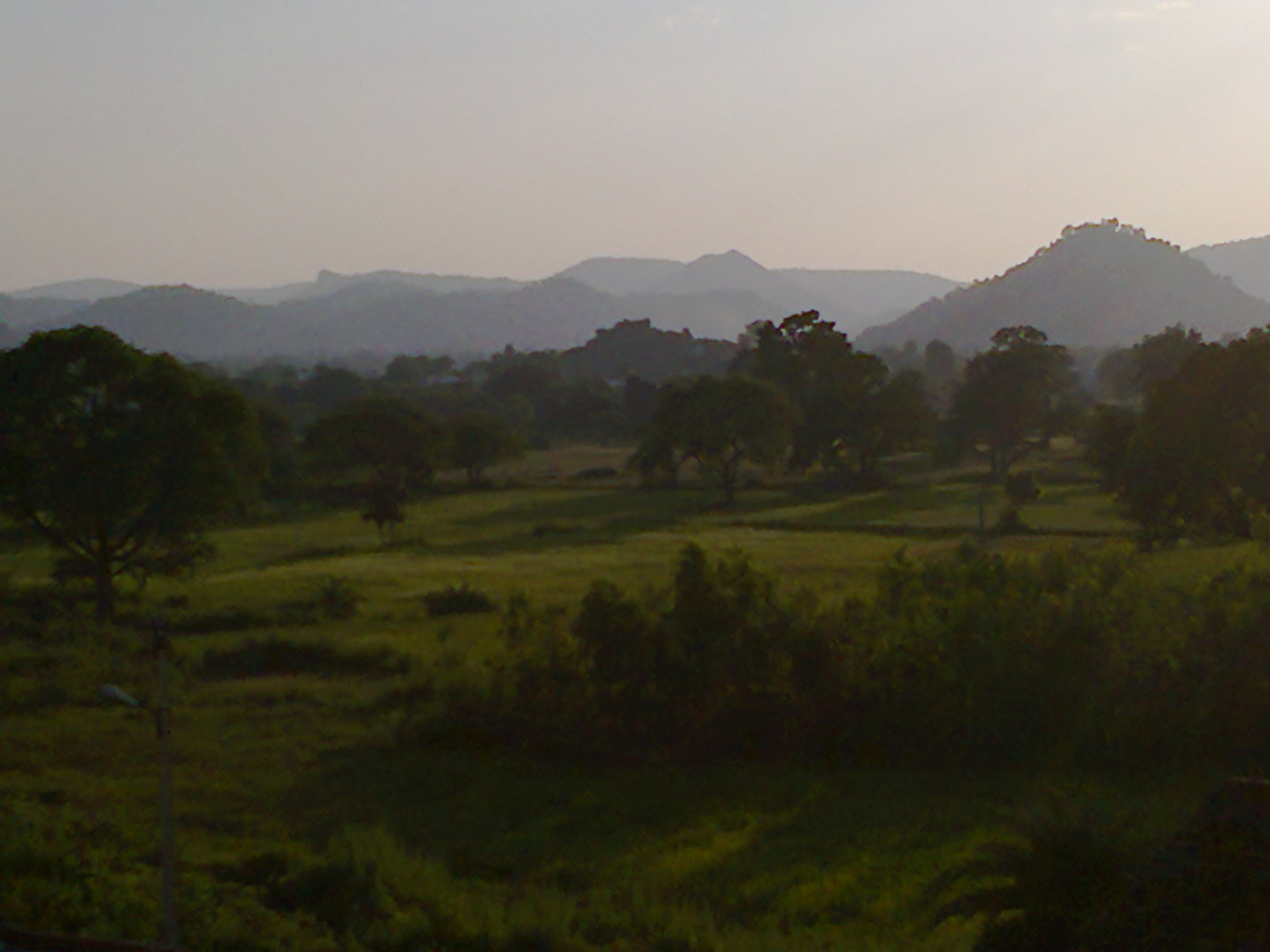
View of Kanker from DIET

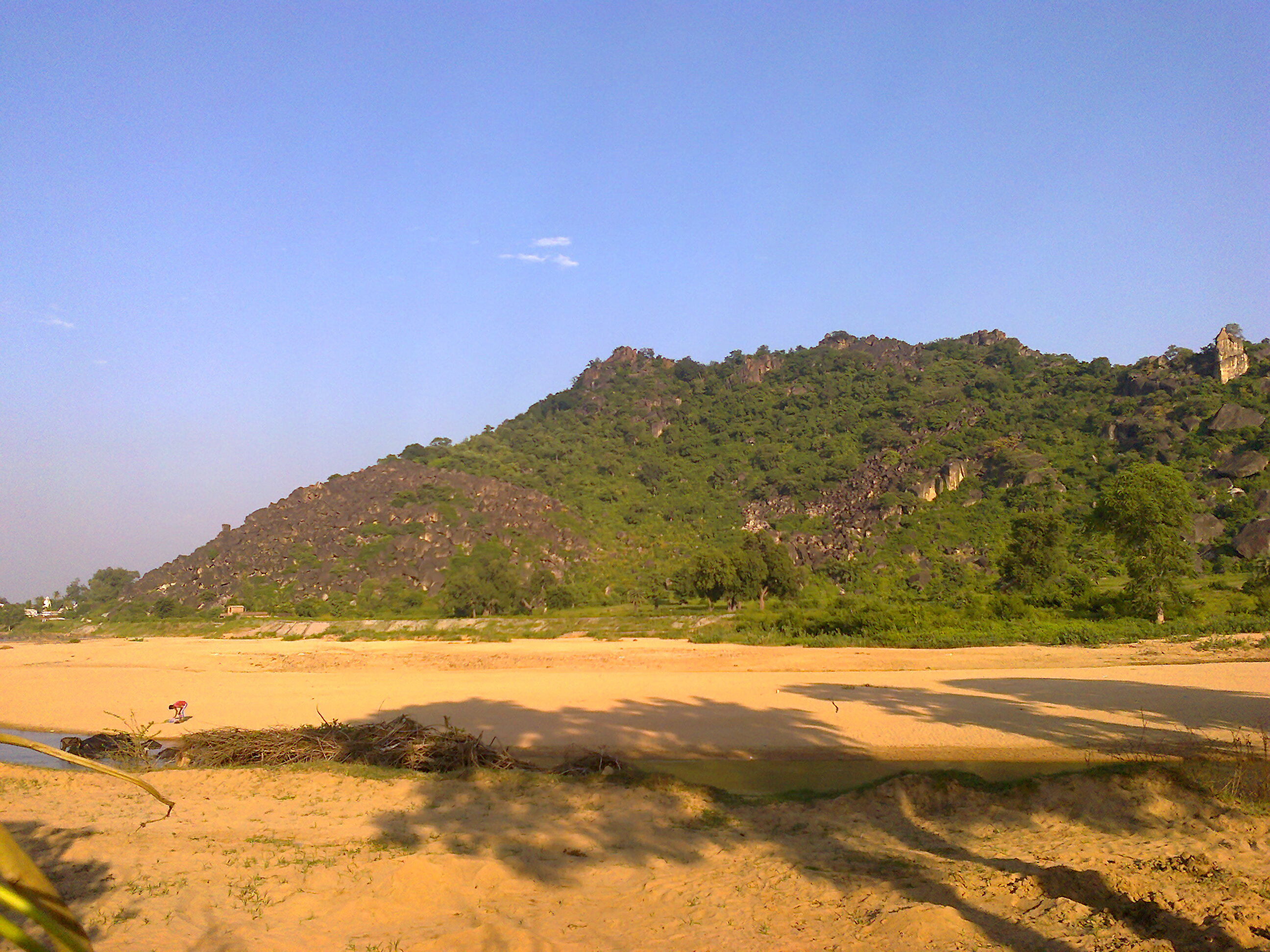
Doodh river in Kanker

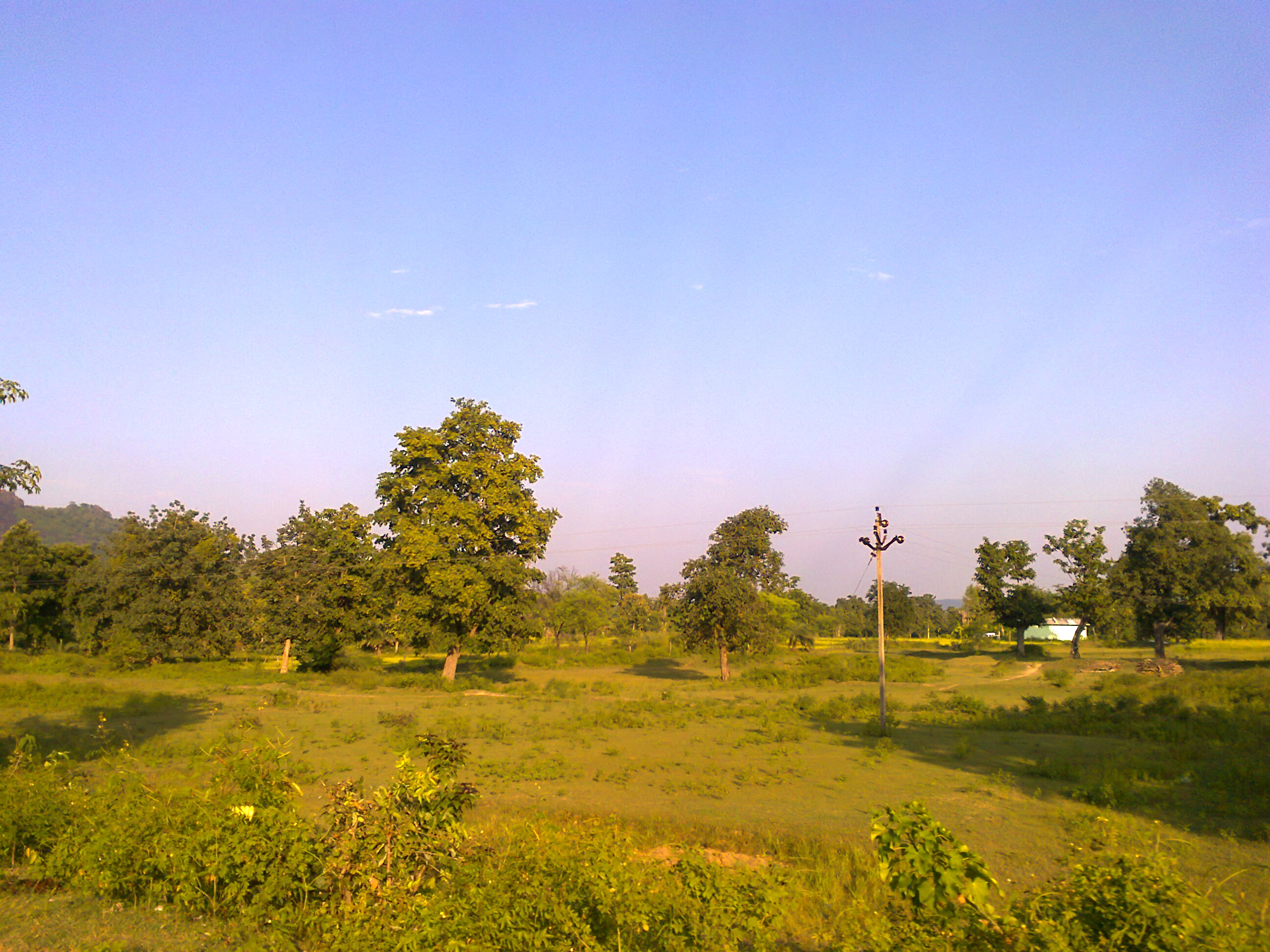
Villages around Kanker

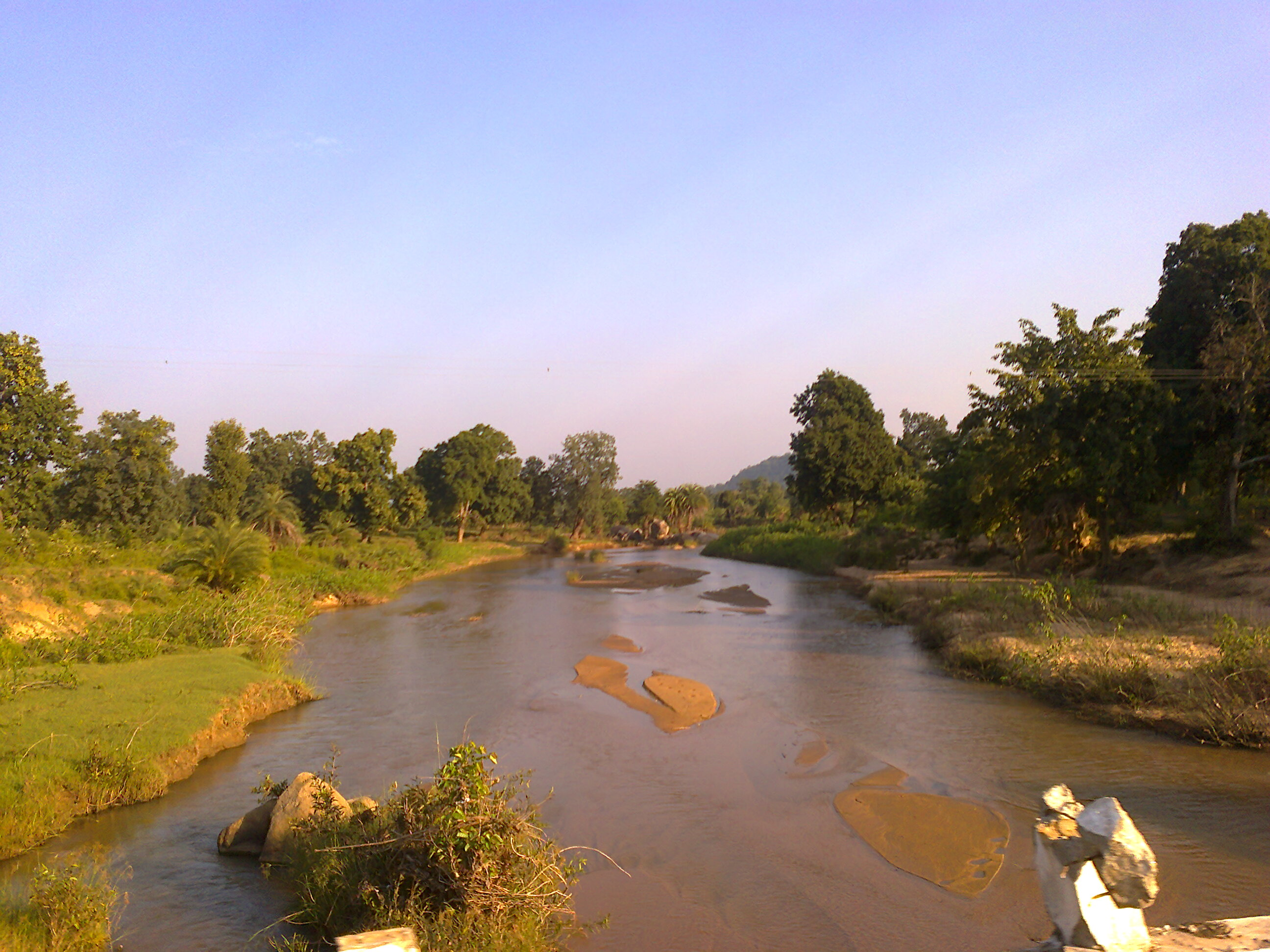
Stream in Kanker

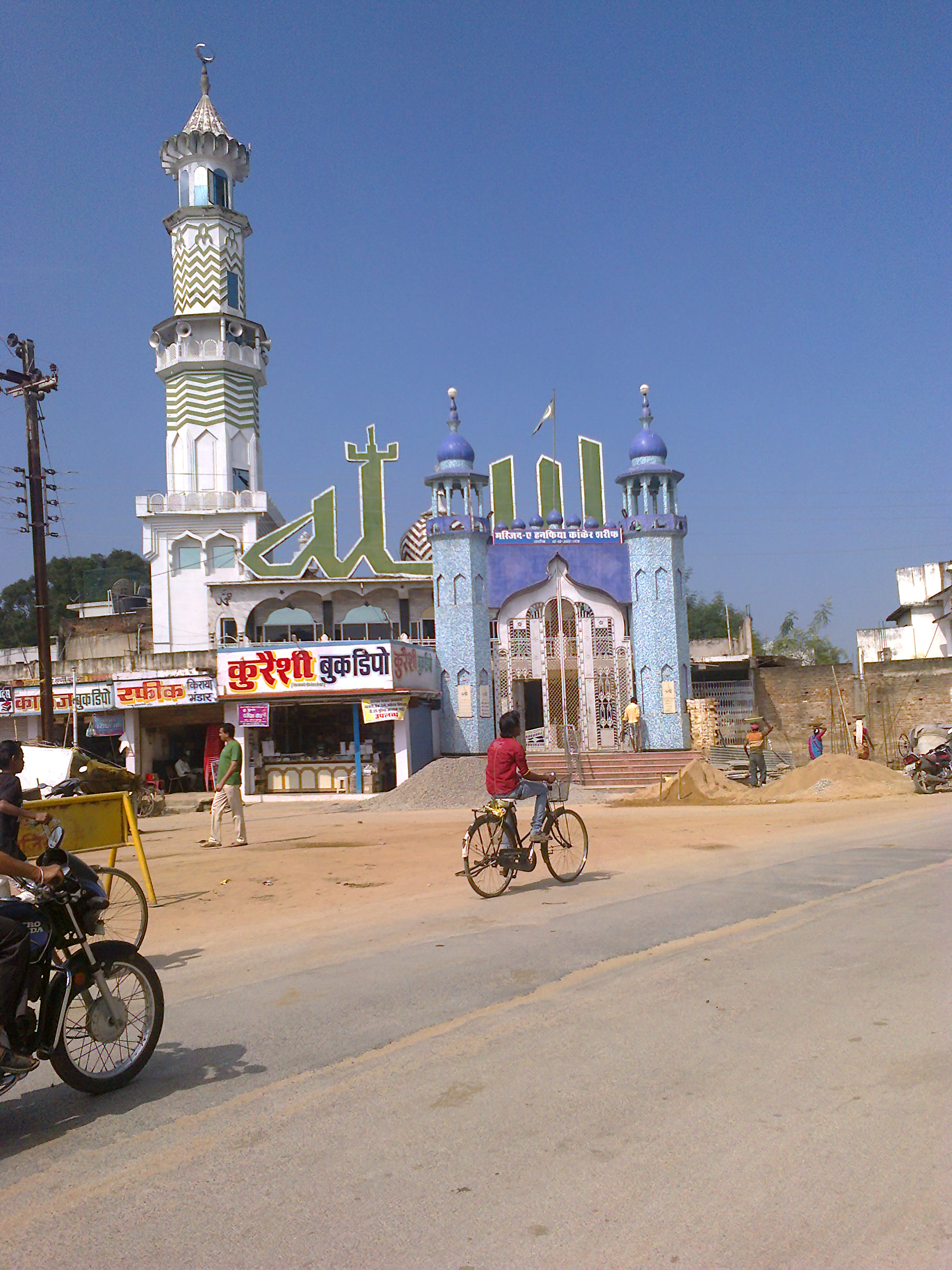
Mosque in Kanker

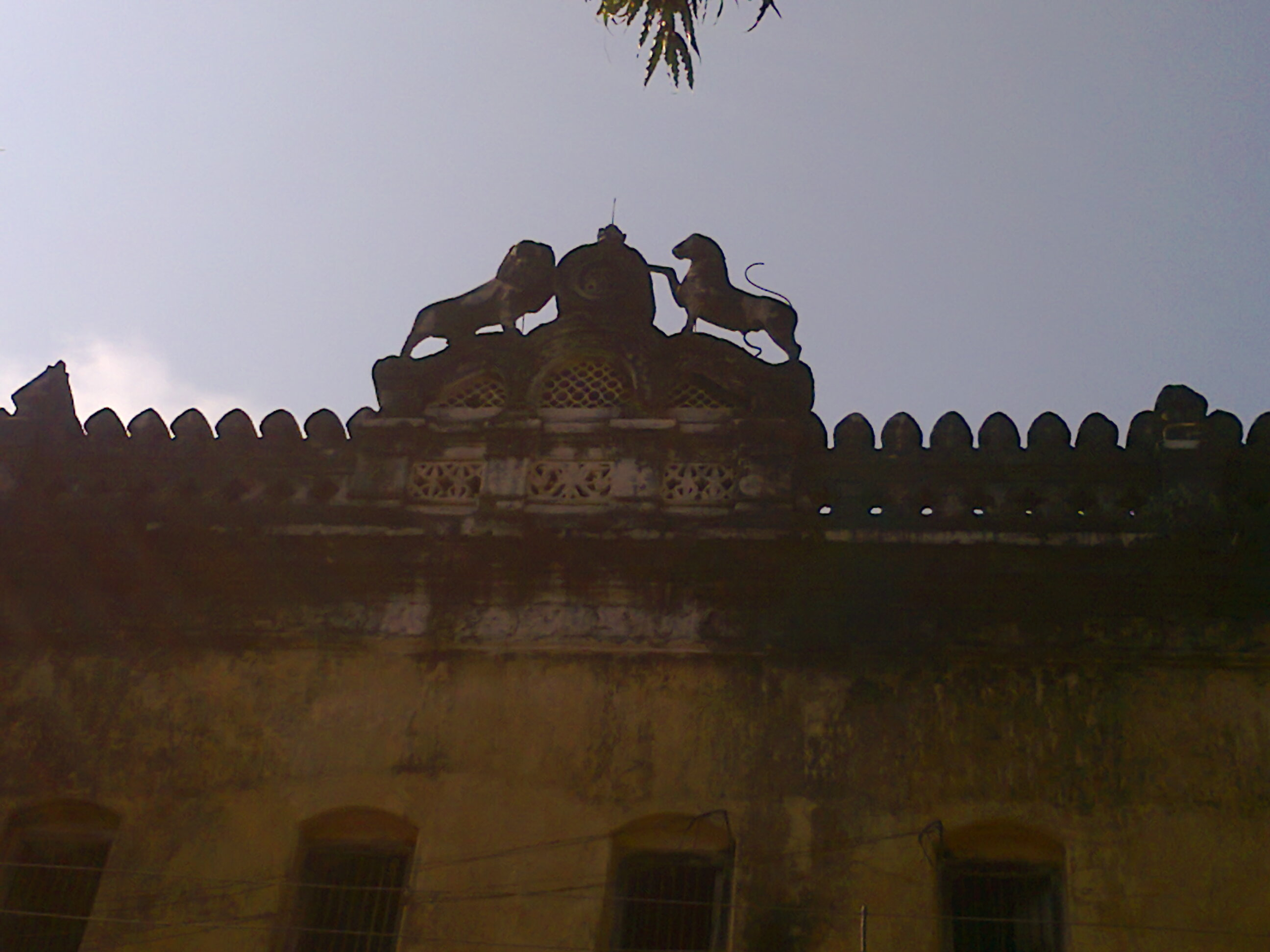
Tehsildar office

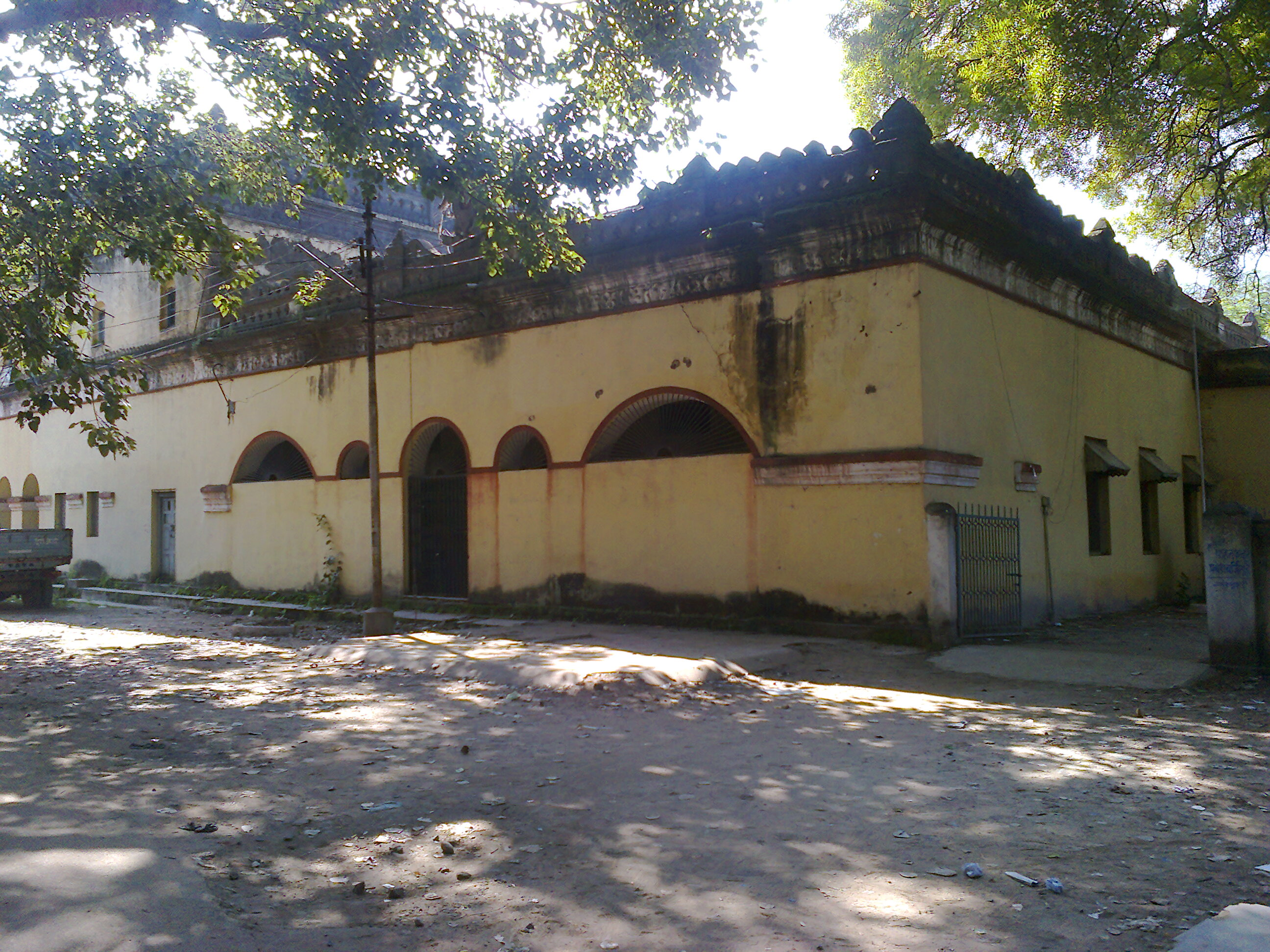
Tehsildar office 2
