= Madhulika Ramteke =

Indian social entrepreneur

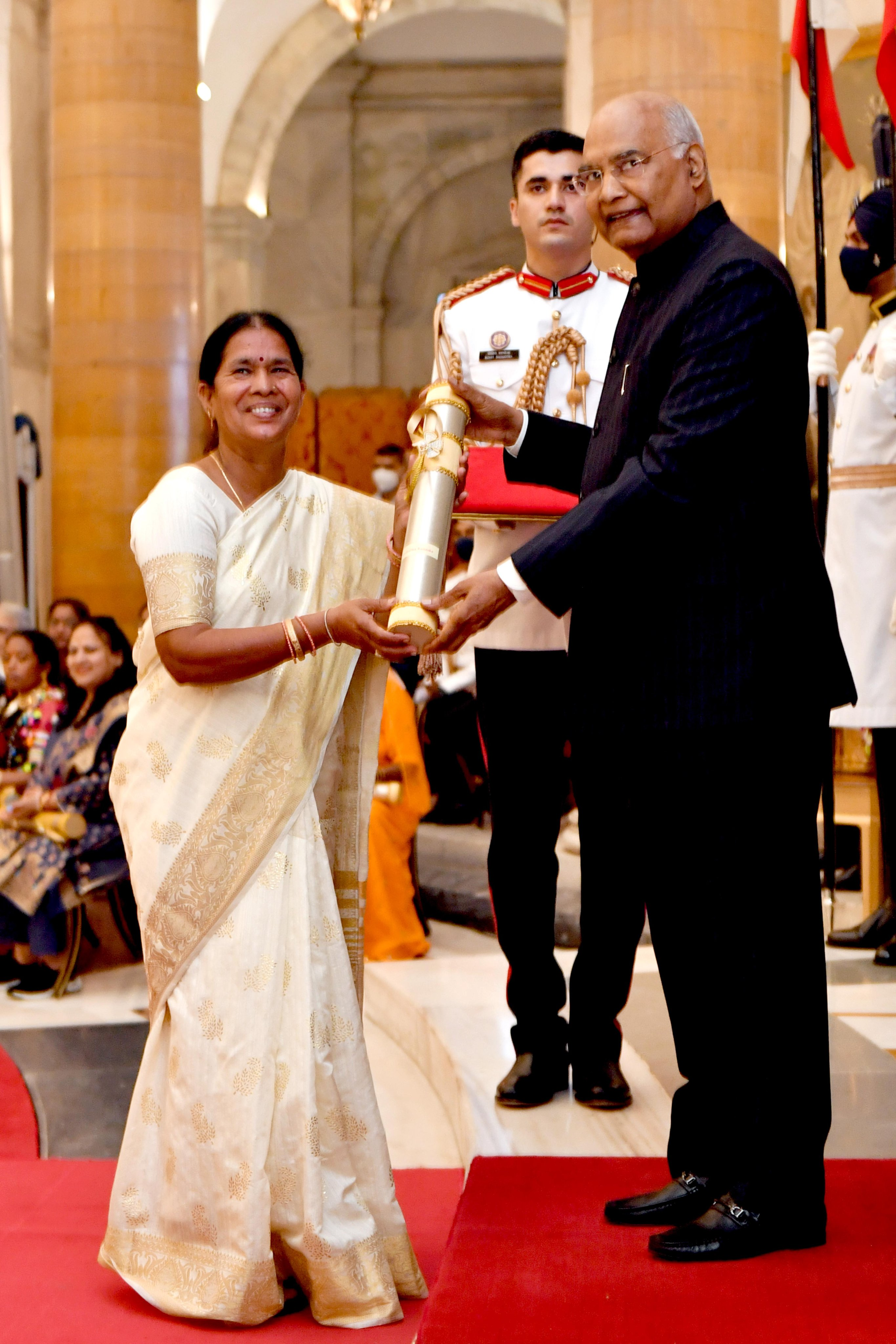
Madhulika Ramteke receives the Nari Shakti Puraskar in 2022

Madhulika Ramteke is an Indian social entrepreneur from Chhattisgarh. She founded a microfinance bank run by women and works with survivors of domestic abuse. She has received the Nari Shakti Puraskar in recognition of her achievements.

== Career ==
Ramteke is from Rajnandgaon district in the state of Chhattisgarh. She grew up in an illiterate household and after studying at school taught her parents to write. Ramteke became an Indian social entrepreneur when she set up a self-help group for women in her village, which founded the Maa Bamleshwari Bank in 2001, in order to support local projects through microfinance. Ramteke pooled her savings with other women and began to lend to other women who wanted to pay for things such as healthcare or buy a second-hand bicycle. The bank then began to lease land and by 2012, it had 5,372 branches and was still completely run by women. It is composed of small self-help groups in which 80,000 women are involved. Ramteke works with female survivors of domestic abuse and teaches villagers skills such as how to grow yam and how to manage vermicompost. She believes that use of chemical fertilisers can lead to bad health and that compost created naturally by worms produces better tasting food. Moreover she believes that these chemical fertilisers make you unwell. In 2018 she organised better sanitation in 64 villages.

Ramteke's self-help group set up three societies in 2016: one began to farm cow milk for sale, a second grew Hara Bahera (an ayurvedic herb) and the third cultivated Sitafal (sugar-apple) in order to produce ice cream. In recognition of her achievements, Ramteke was awarded the 2021 Nari Shakti Puraskar by President Ram Nath Kovind on International Women's Day 2022.

== See also ==
- Smita Tandi – another Nari Shakti Puraskar awardee from Chhattisgarh
