= Dudhawa =

Dudhawa is a village in Kanker district of Chhattisgarh state of India. The village is known for Dudhawa Dam built across Mahanadi river constructed between 1953 and 1964.

== See also ==
- Dudhwa National Park
