= Sarona =

Sarona may refer to:

== Places ==
- Sarona (colony), a neighborhood of Tel Aviv, Israel
- Sarona (community), Wisconsin, an unincorporated community located in the town of Sarona, Washburn County, Wisconsin, United States
- Sarona, Wisconsin, town in Washburn County, Wisconsin, United States
- Sarona, Chhattisgarh, a village in Kanker district, India

== People ==
- Sarona Aiono-Iosefa (born 1962), Samoan New Zealander who writes children's fiction

== See also ==
- Sharona (disambiguation)
