= Tarasgaon =

Coordinates: 20°23′N 81°28′E

Tarasgaon is a village in the Kanker district (North Baster) of Chhattisgarh state, central India. The 2011 Census of India recorded 1,437 inhabitants in this town.

== See also ==
- Kanker district
