= Barfani Dham =

- Temple
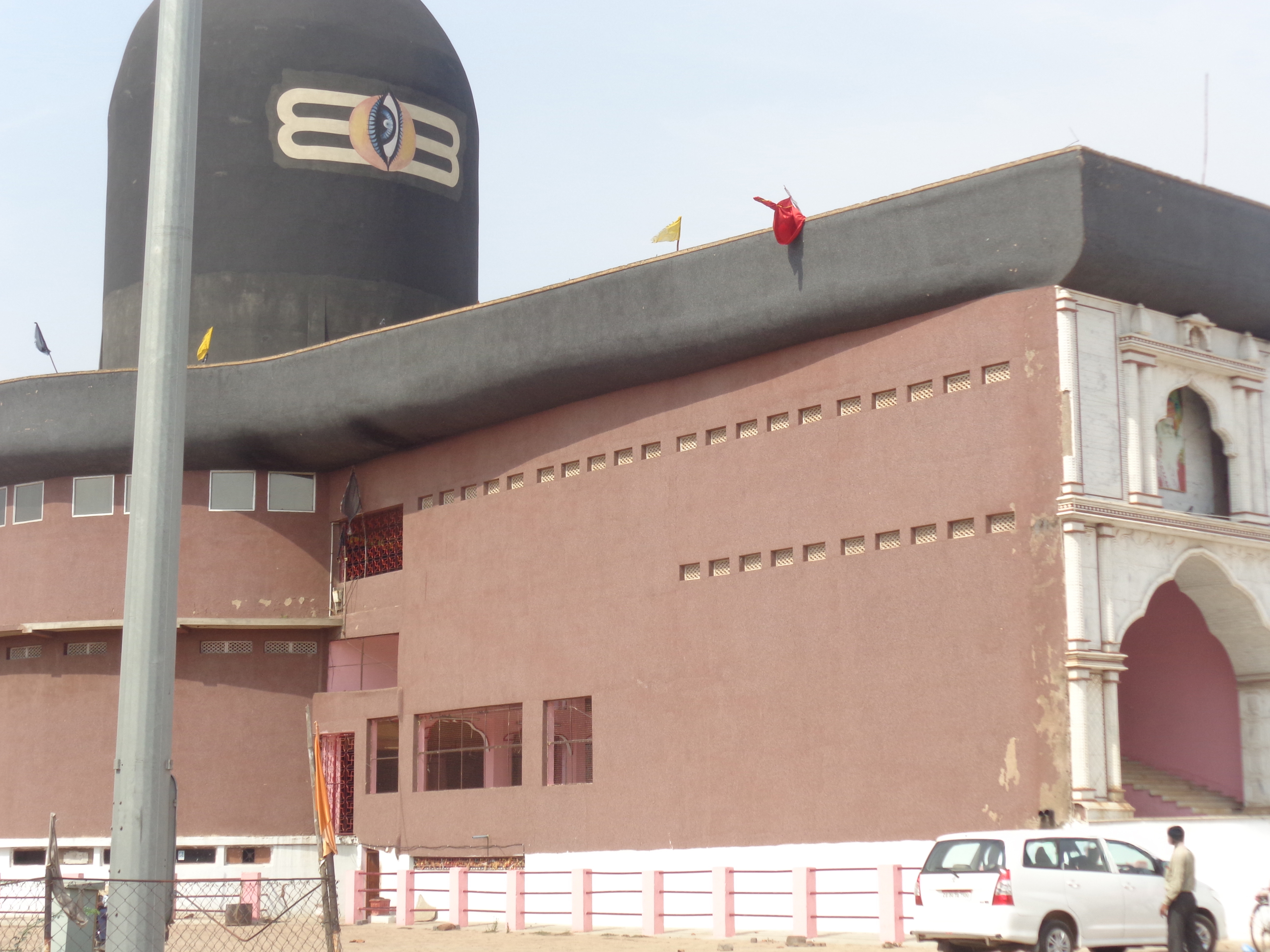

- Location in Chhattisgarh, India Barfani Dham (India)
- Coordinates: 21°5′34″N 81°00′22″E
- Country: India
- State: Chhattisgarh
- District: Rajnandgaon

Languages
  - Official: Hindi, Chhattisgarhi
- Time zone: UTC+5:30 (IST)
- Vehicle registration: CG-08
- Nearest city: Dongargarh

Barfani Dham (Patal Bhairvi) is a temple situated in the town of Rajnandgaon in Rajnandgaon district of the Indian state of Chhattisgarh. It is 40 kilometres (25 mi) from Durg towards Nagpur. A large Shiva Linga can be seen at the top of the temple while a large Nandi statue stands in front of it.

== Structure ==
The temple is constructed in three levels. The bottom layer is the shrine of Pathal bhairavi, the second is the Navadurga or Tripura Sundari shrine and the upper level is of Shiva.

== Gallery ==
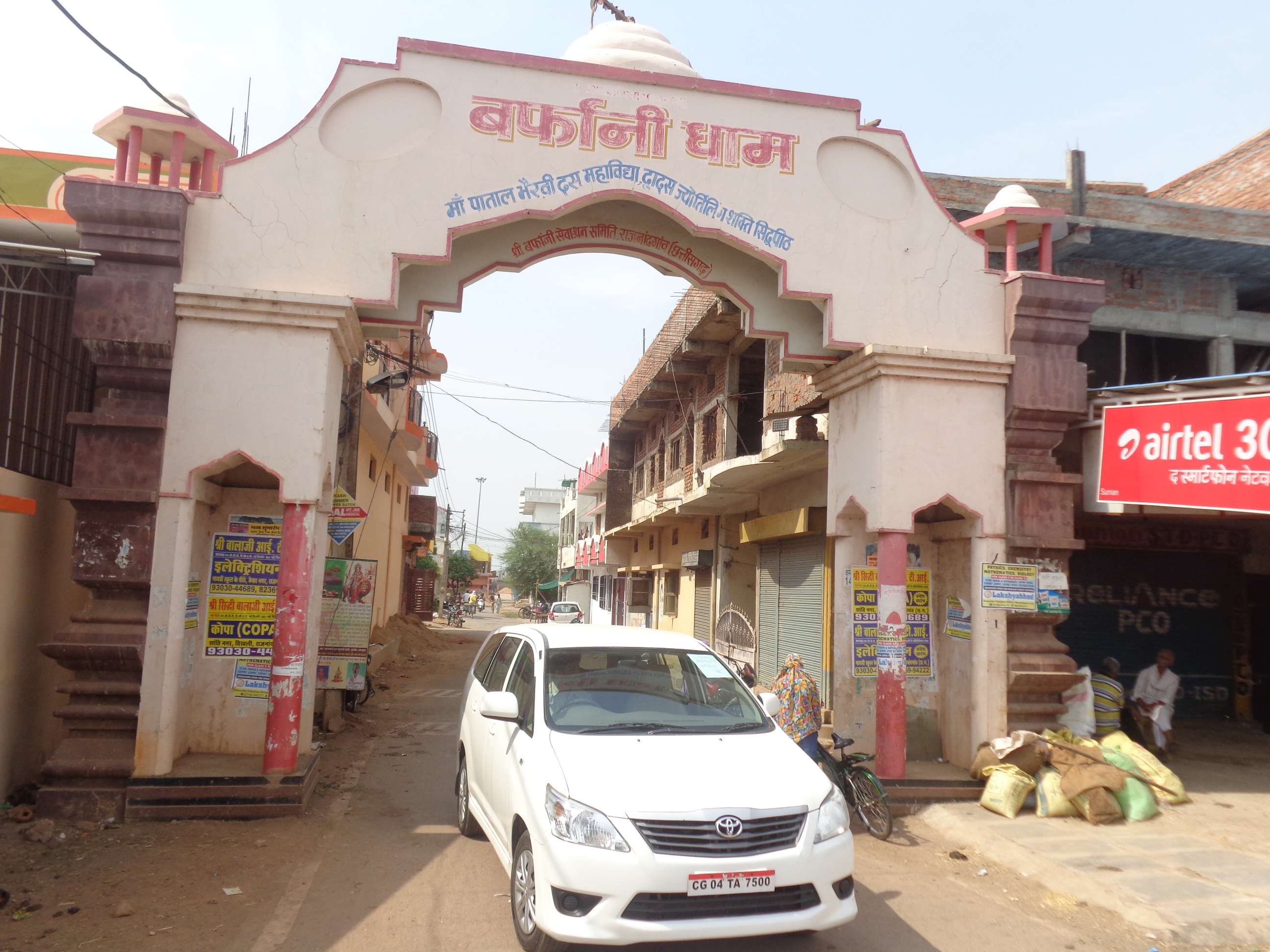
gate of barfani dham

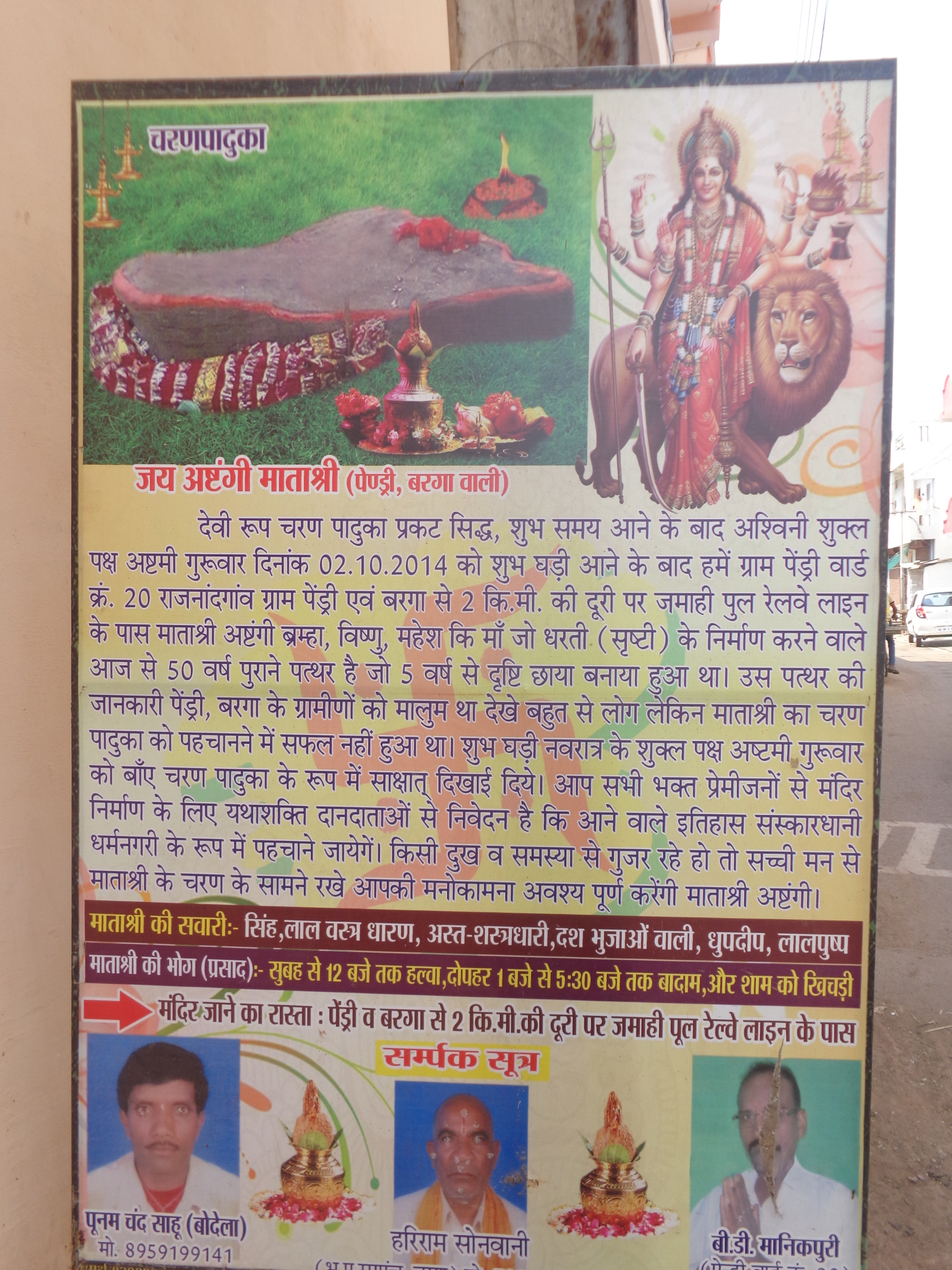
details board

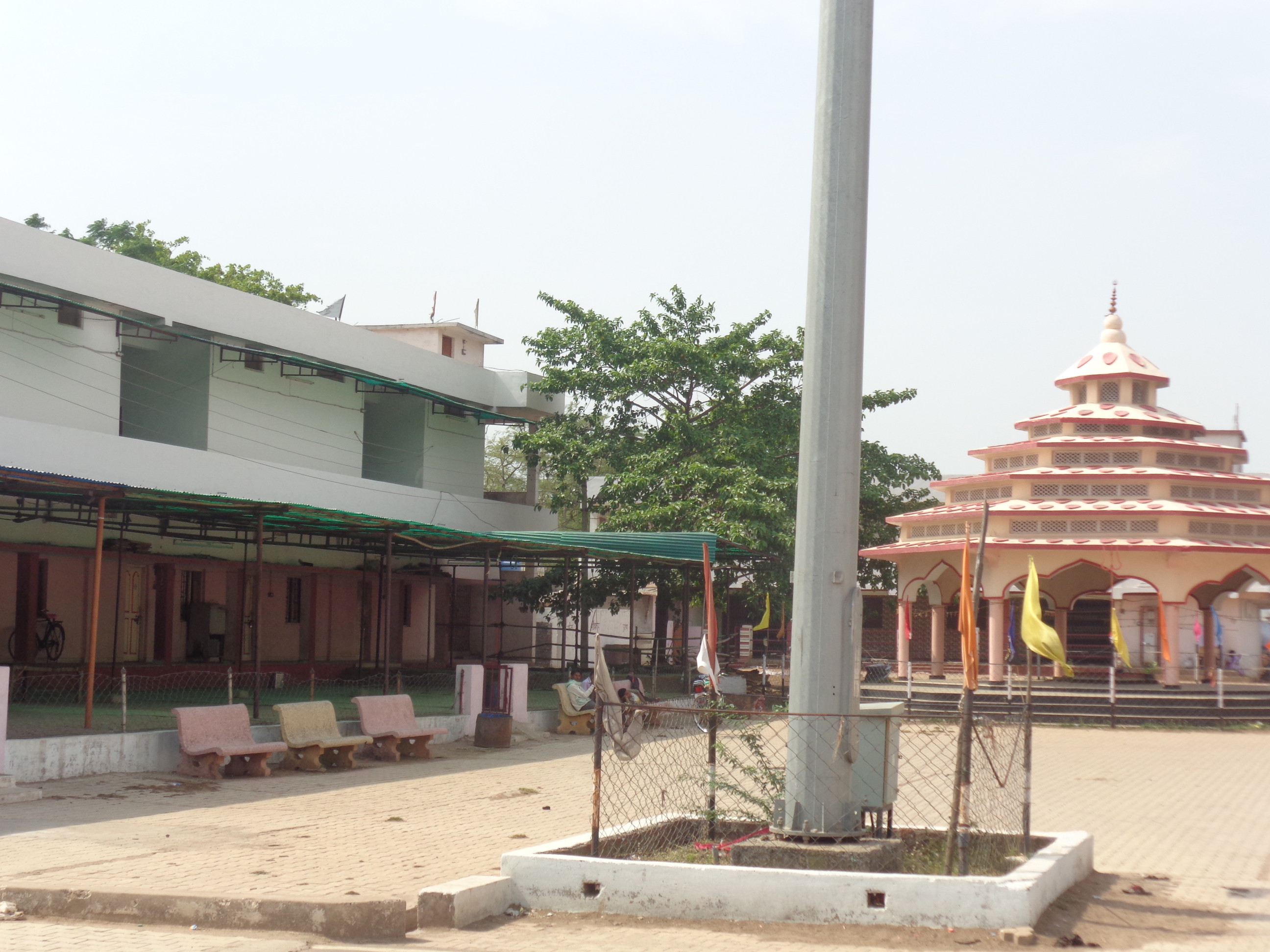
temple

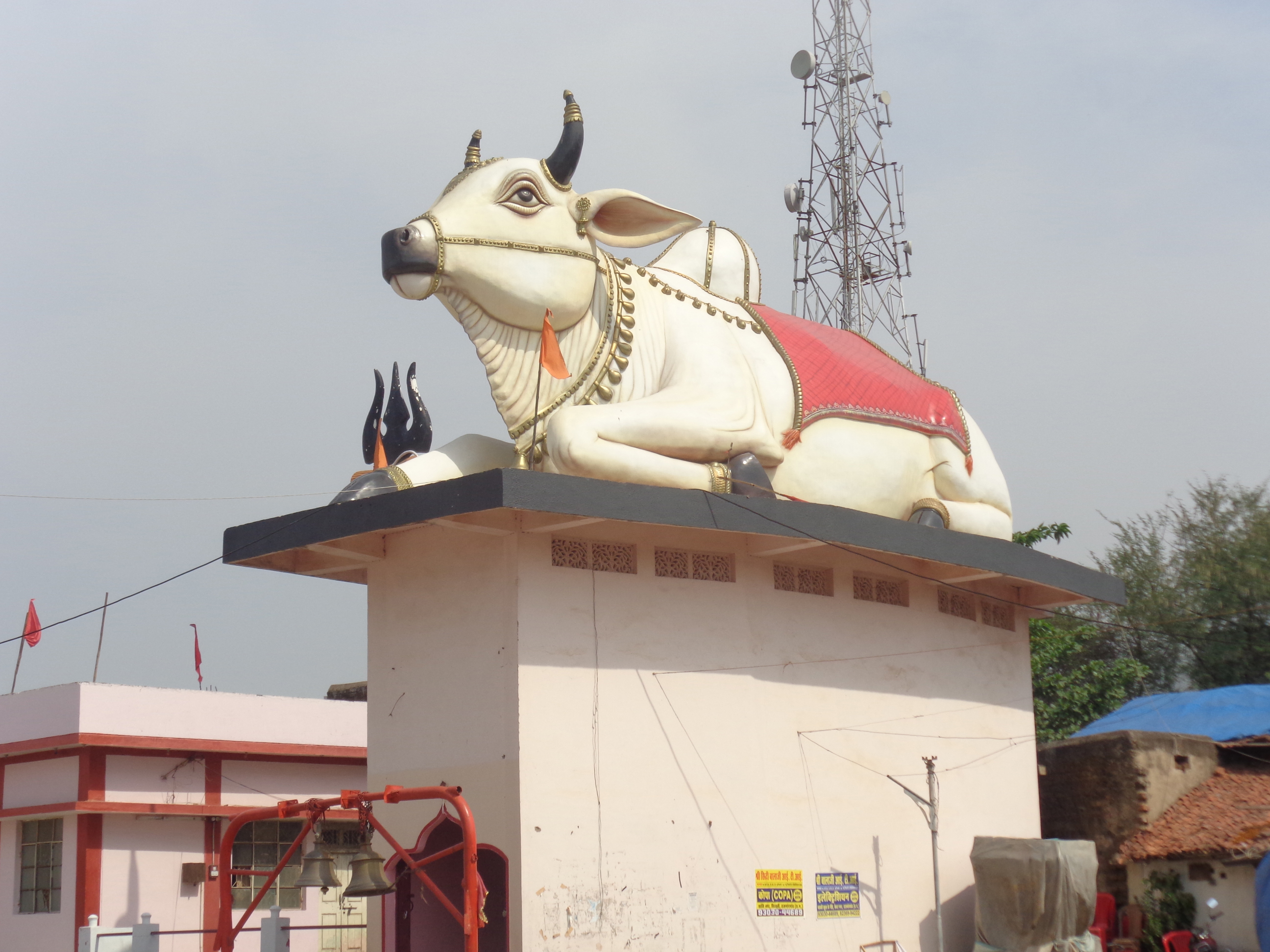
Nandi (bull)

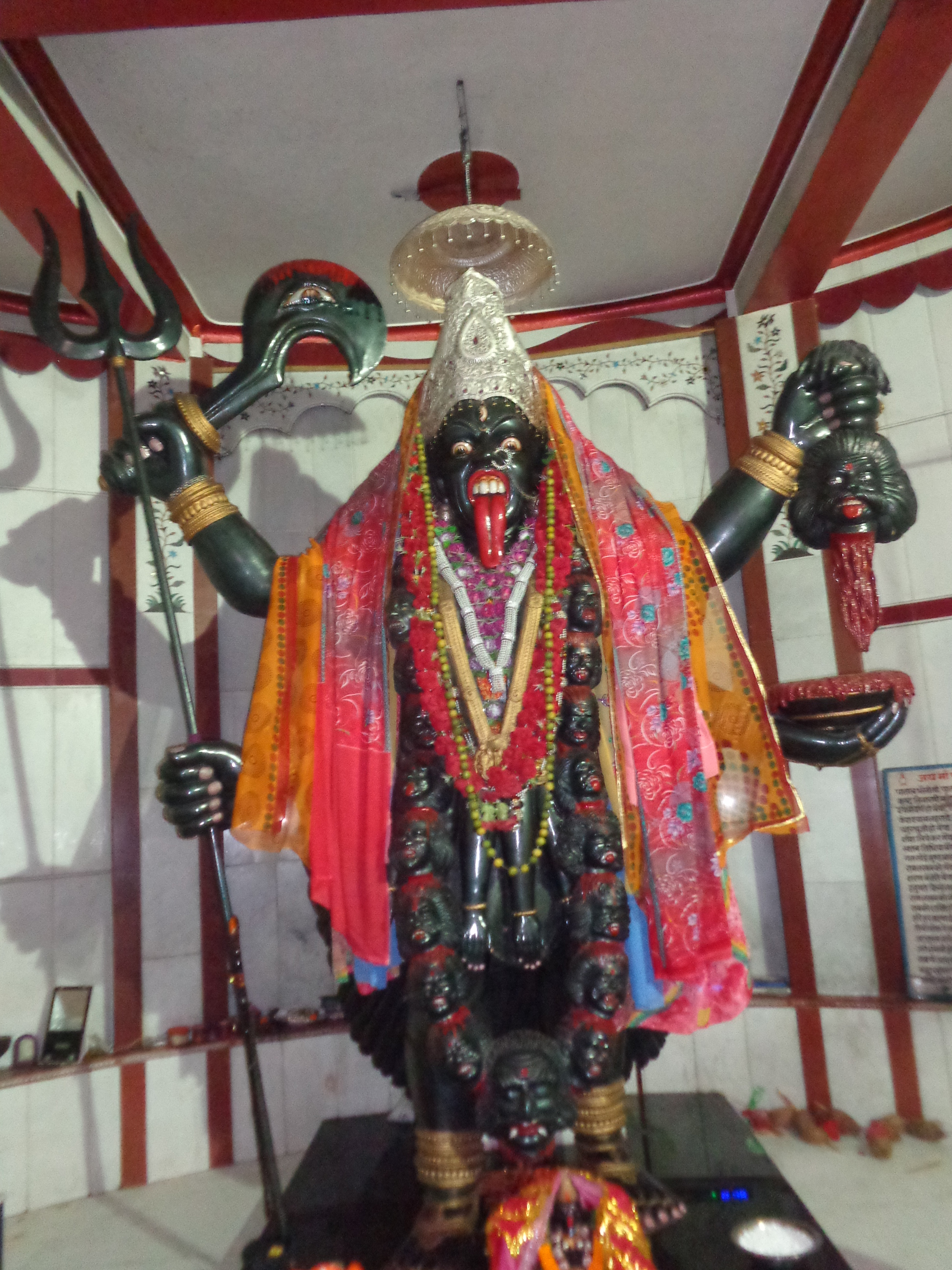
pathal bhairavi

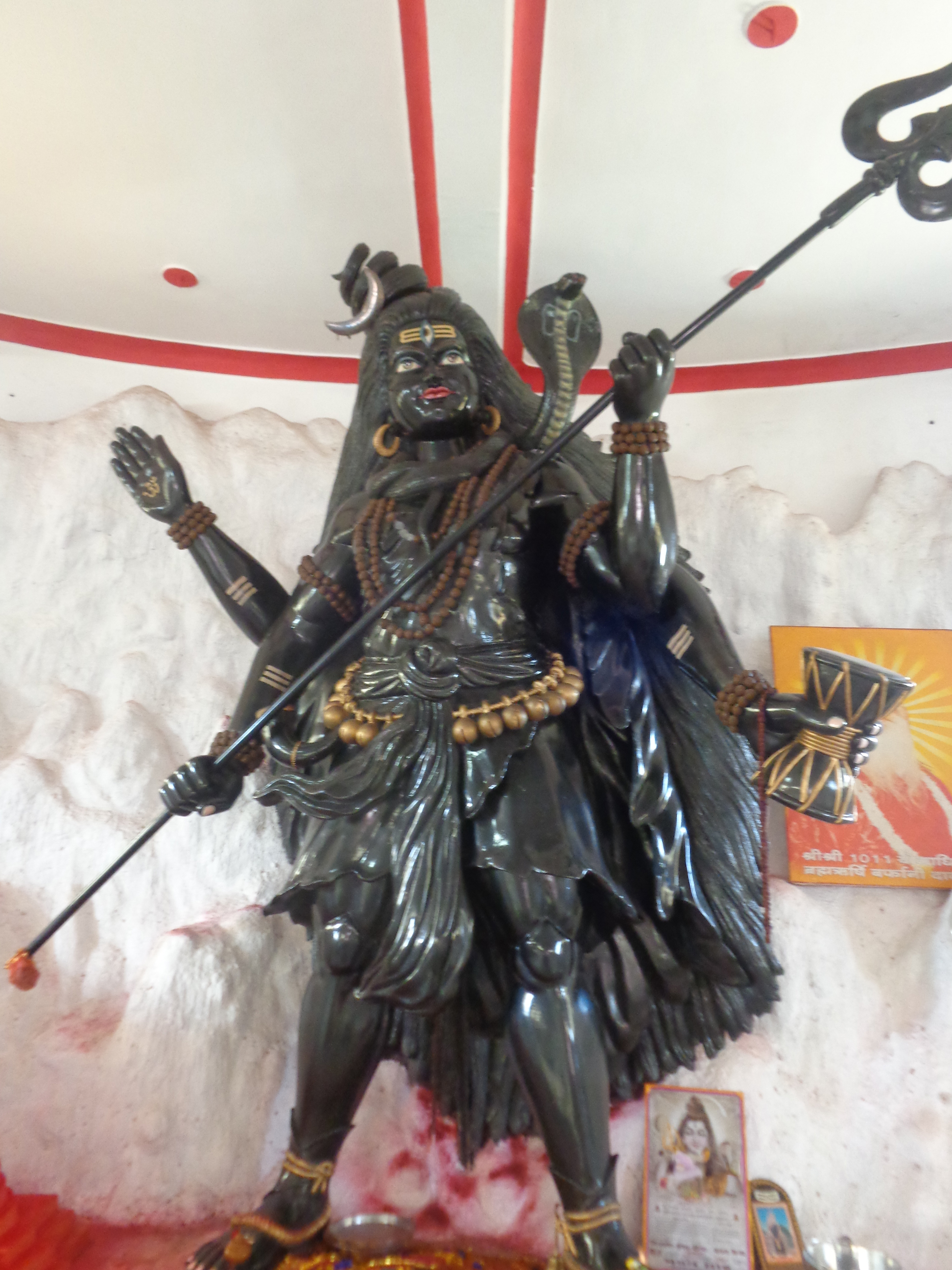
Shiva statue

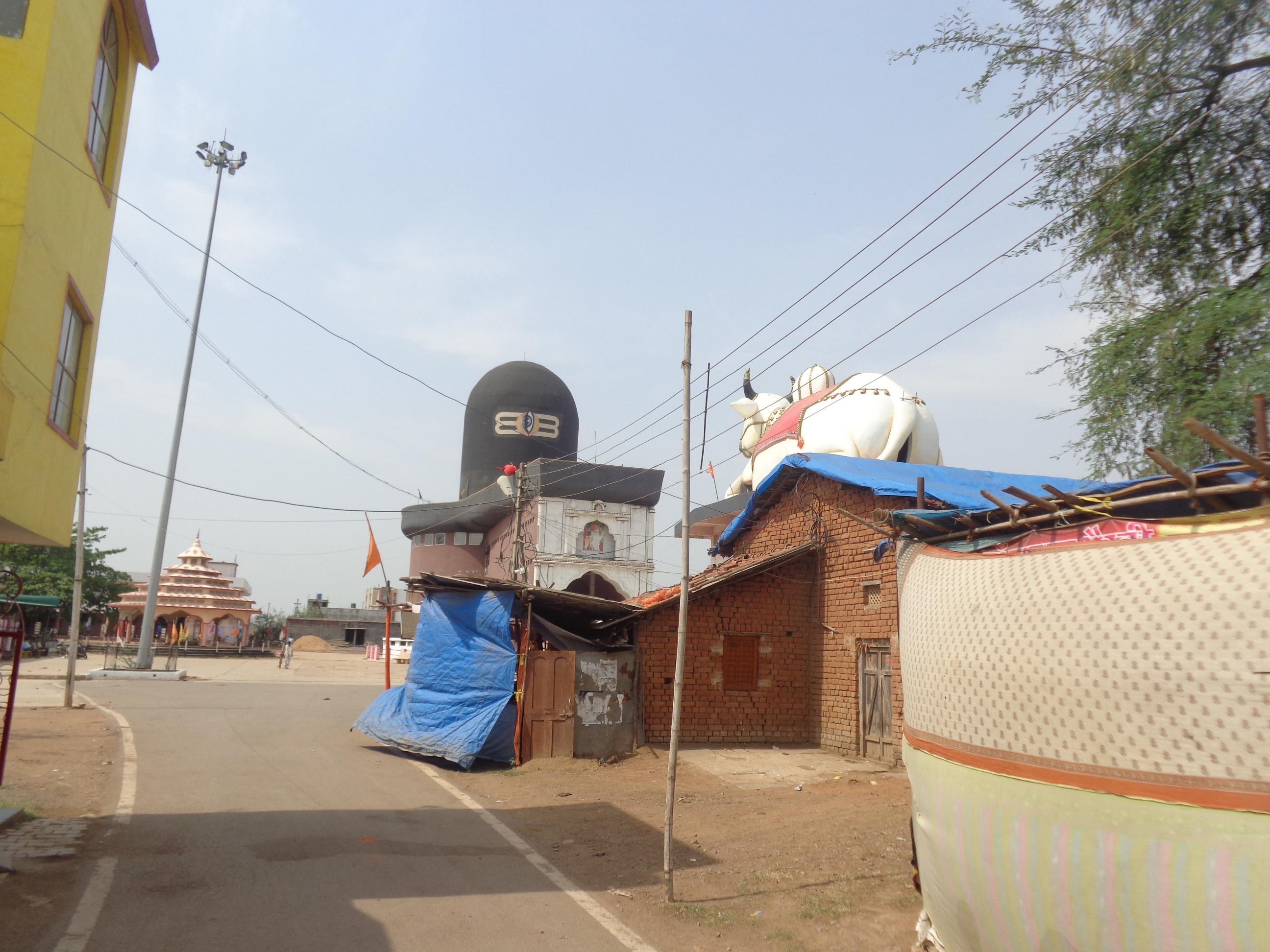
view of barfani dham from distance

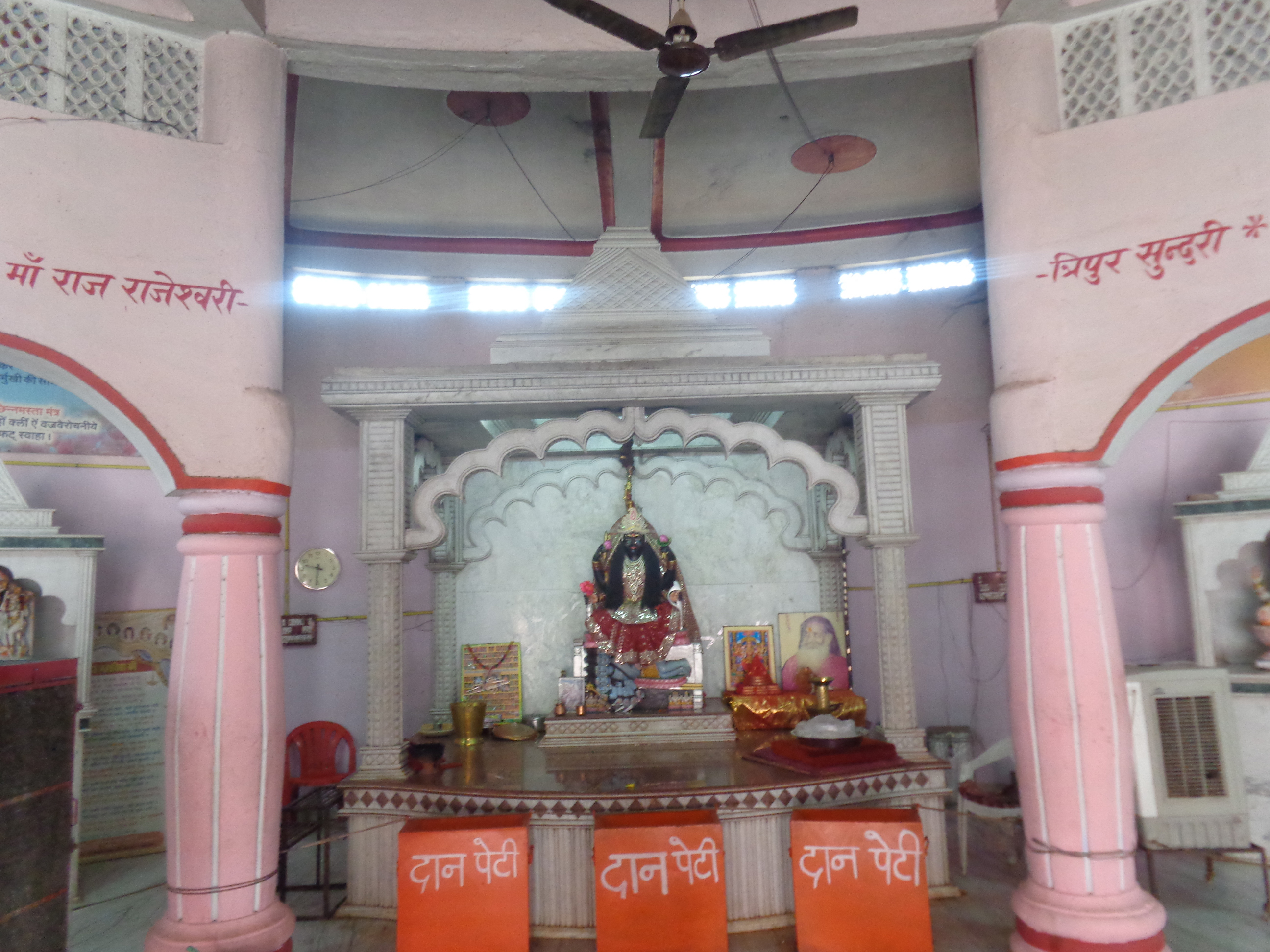
Tripura Sundari
