= Sharona (disambiguation) =

Sharona is a moshav in Israel.

Sharona may also refer to:

- Sharona Bakker (born 1990), Dutch hurdler
- Sharona Ben-Tov Muir, American writer and academic
- Sharona Fleming, a major character in the television series Monk
- Sharona, a recurring character on the American animated sitcom BoJack Horseman

== See also ==
- "My Sharona", a 1979 song by the rock band The Knack
- Sarona (disambiguation)
