= Charama =

Locality in Chhattisgarh, India

Coordinates: 20.479°N 81.375°E

Charama is a Nagar Panchayat (Notified Area Council) city in the Kanker district (North Baster) of Chhattisgarh state, central India. The 2011 Census of India recorded 9,707 inhabitants in this town.

== See also ==
- Kanker district
