= Madai Festival =

Festival in Chhattisgarh, India

Madai festival is one of many popular festivals of Sanskritik Chhattisgarh. The festival reflects the rich culture and tradition of the state. The Madai Festival is celebrated with great enthusiasm and excitement by people belonging to the Gond Tribe. It is celebrated from the month of December to March and tours from one place of the state to another. The Charama and Kurna communities of Kanker district, tribes of Bastar and people of Bhanupratappur, Narayanpur, Kondagaon, Pakhanjore and Antagarh celebrate the Madai Festival in the state of Chhattisgarh.

The local tribes of the state along with other communities worship the presiding deity during the festival. In the beginning of Madai Festival, the tribal people of Chhattisgarh launch a procession on an open field where a large number of devotees and general tourists gather to witness the rituals. After the end of the procession, the priest or similar figure starts worshiping the goddess. While the Puja ceremony goes on, the onlookers maintain silence and also offer prayers to the feet of the deity. When the worshiping finishes, several cultural events like folk dance, drama, songs etc. start taking place in the open space. As a huge number of villagers come to enjoy the occasion, the Madai Festival is always organized on a vast stretch of land. The Bastar region of Chhattisgarh marks the beginning of the Madai Festival.

From Bastar the festival goes to the Kanker district of the state from where it moves to Narayanpur, Antagarh and Bhanupratappur. Keshkal, Bhopalpattnam and Kondagaon welcome Madai Festival in the month of March when it comes to its end. Since the Madai Festival goes from one location to another, each tribe and other human groups of Chhattisgarh enjoy the pleasures of the occasion. Derived from the old customs and traditions of the state, the Madai Festival today has become a popular religious event in Chhattisgarh and also India as a whole.
