= Narharpur, Chhattisgarh =

City in Chhattisgarh state, India

Coordinates: 20.449°N 81.624°E

Narharpur is a Nagar Panchayat (Notified Area Council) city in the Kanker district (North Baster) of Chhattisgarh state, central India. The 2011 Census of India recorded 4,509 inhabitants in this town.

== See also ==
- Kanker district
