= Pragyagiri =

pragyagiri प्रज्ञागिरि
- Buddha vihara, Pannya Metta Sangha India
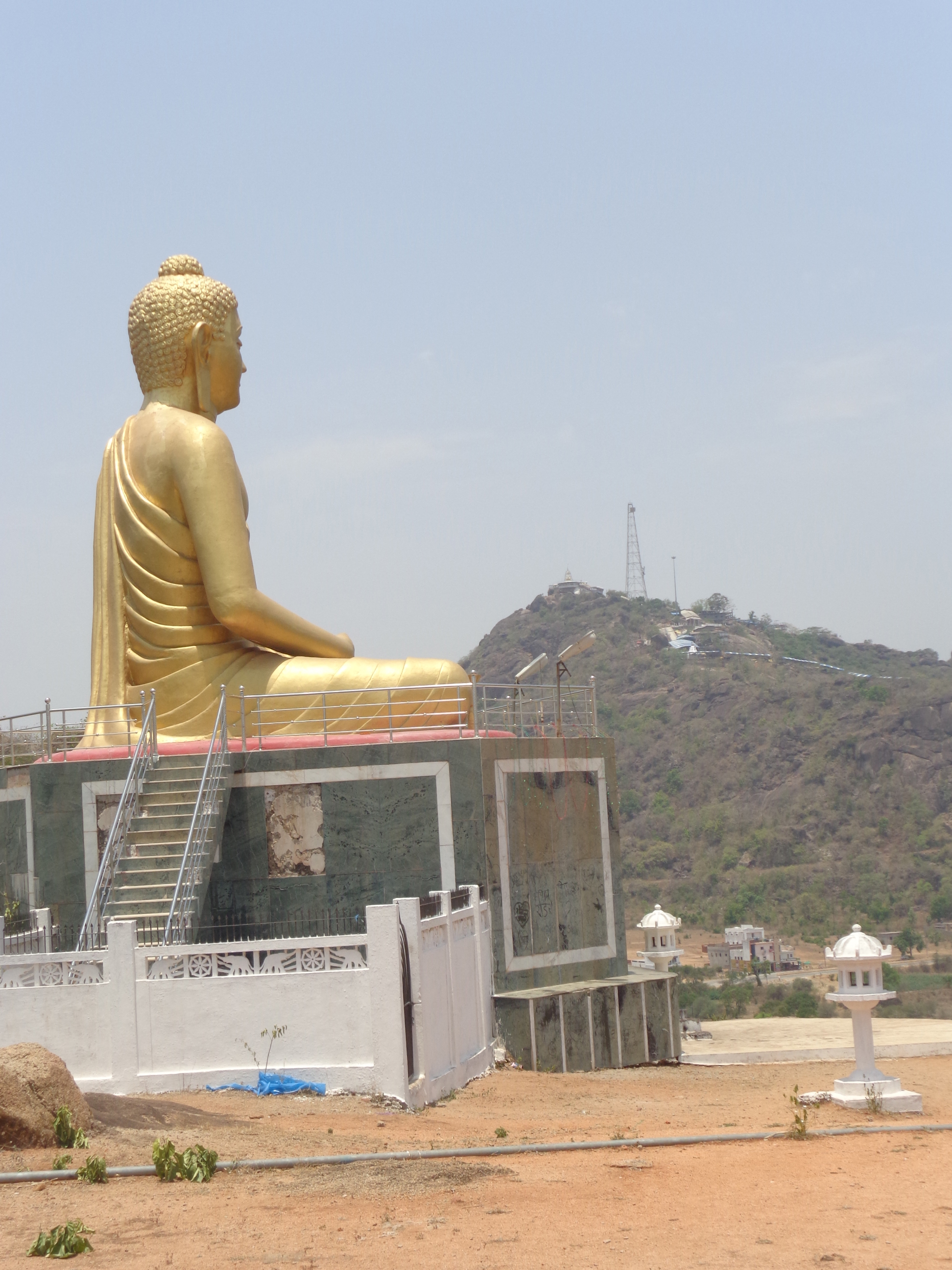

- Location in Chhattisgarh, India pragyagiri (India)
- Coordinates: 21°10′21″N 80°45′48″E
- Country: India
- State: Chhattisgarh
- District: Rajnandgaon

Languages
  - Official: Hindi, Chhattisgarhi
- Time zone: UTC+5:30 (IST)
- Vehicle registration: CG
- Nearest city: Dongargarh

Pragya giri is an area of Dongargarh in the Rajnandgaon district of the Indian state of Chhattisgarh situated on a hilltop of 1,000 feet (300 m). There is a Buddh vihara with a large Buddha statue facing east. There are 225 steps leading up the mountain. Construction of Pragyagiri was done in 1998 by Pujya Bhadant Sangharatna Manake k (President Pannya Metta Sangha India).Dhamma work is continuing on Pragyagiri Dongargarh from Pannya Metta sangha India In since 1991. The first International Buddhist Conference was held on 6 February 1992 by Pujya Bhadant Sangharatna Manake (President's Message Mata Sangha). So far, 25 international Buddhist conferences have been organized by the Pannya Metta Sangha.

== Location ==
Dongargarh is 107 kilometers from Raipur, via Bhilai, Durg and Rajnandgaon. Dongargarh does not exactly fall on the massive Mumbai highway, a diversion some 25 km before, from the Calcutta-Mumbai National Highway (NH #6) leads the vehicle through lush green vegetation and mild forests on a narrow winding single road.

Dongargarh is 40 km from district headquarters Rajnandgaon and is well connected with buses from Rajnandgaon. Dongargarh is also well connected with trains. It is on the Mumbai - Howrah main line at a distance of 170 km from Nagpur and 100 km from Raipur. The nearest airport is at Raipur Airport.

Pragyagiri is 1 km before reaching dongergarh.

== Gallery ==
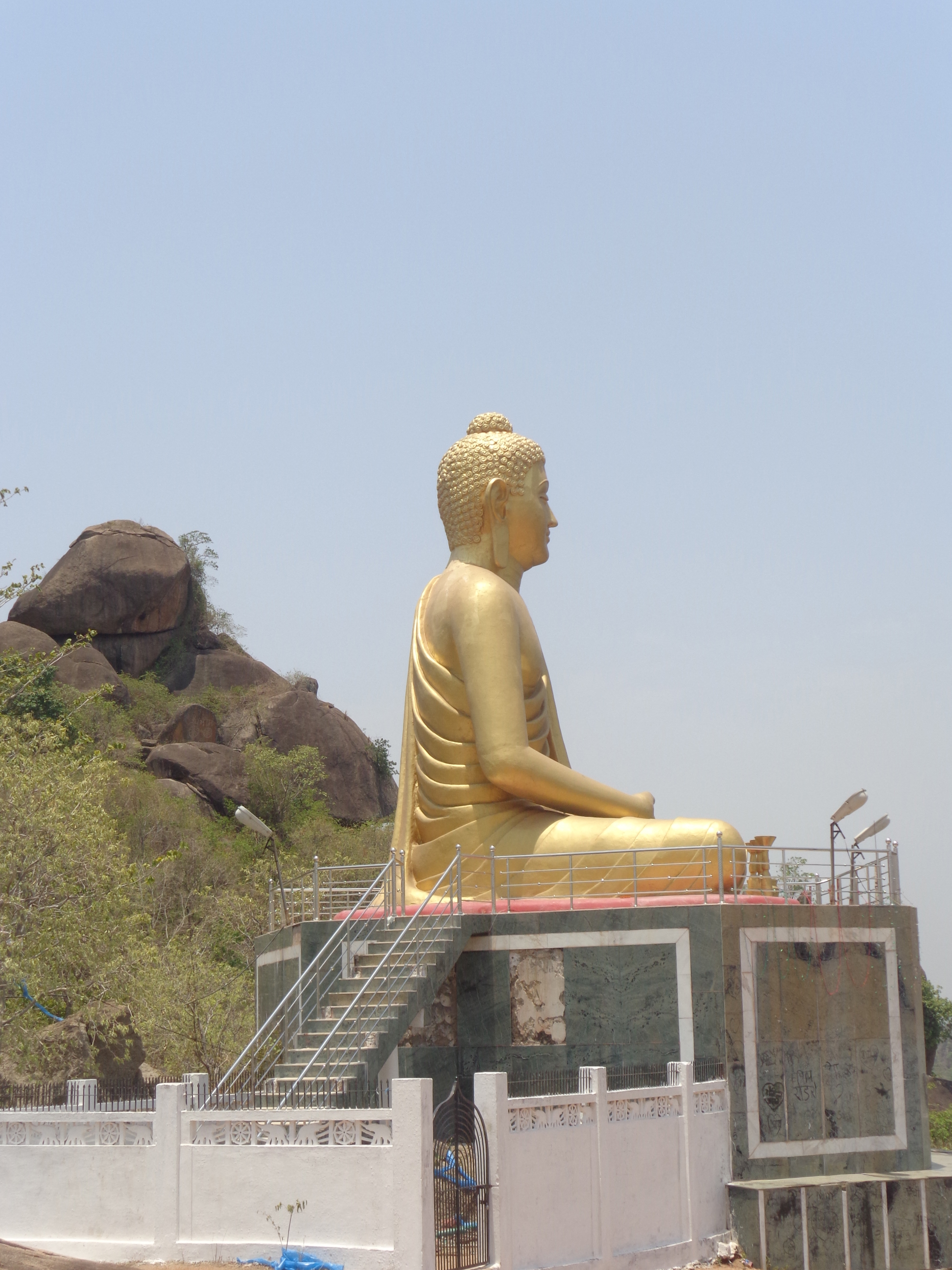
A statue of The Buddha

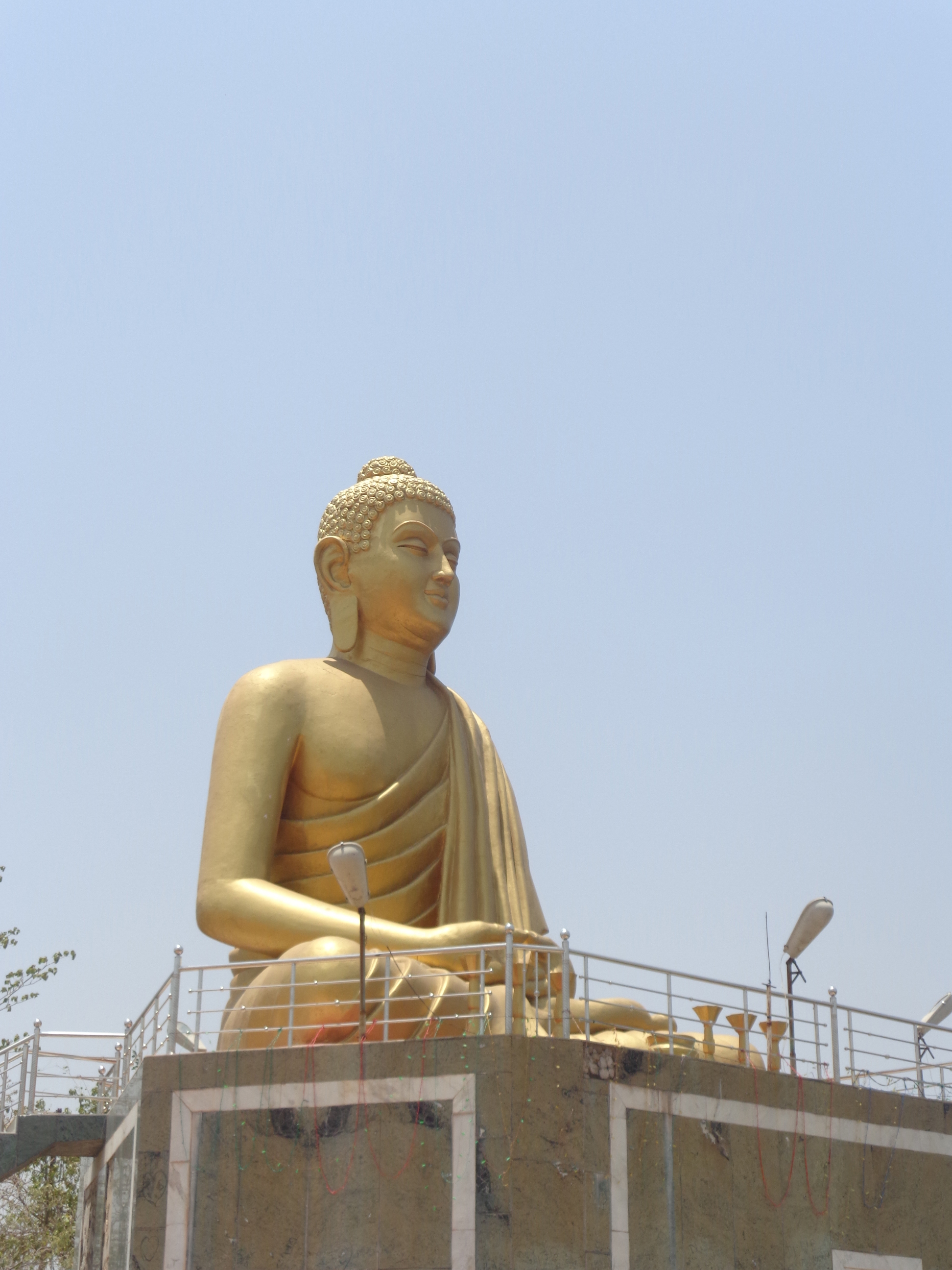
Alternate view of the statue

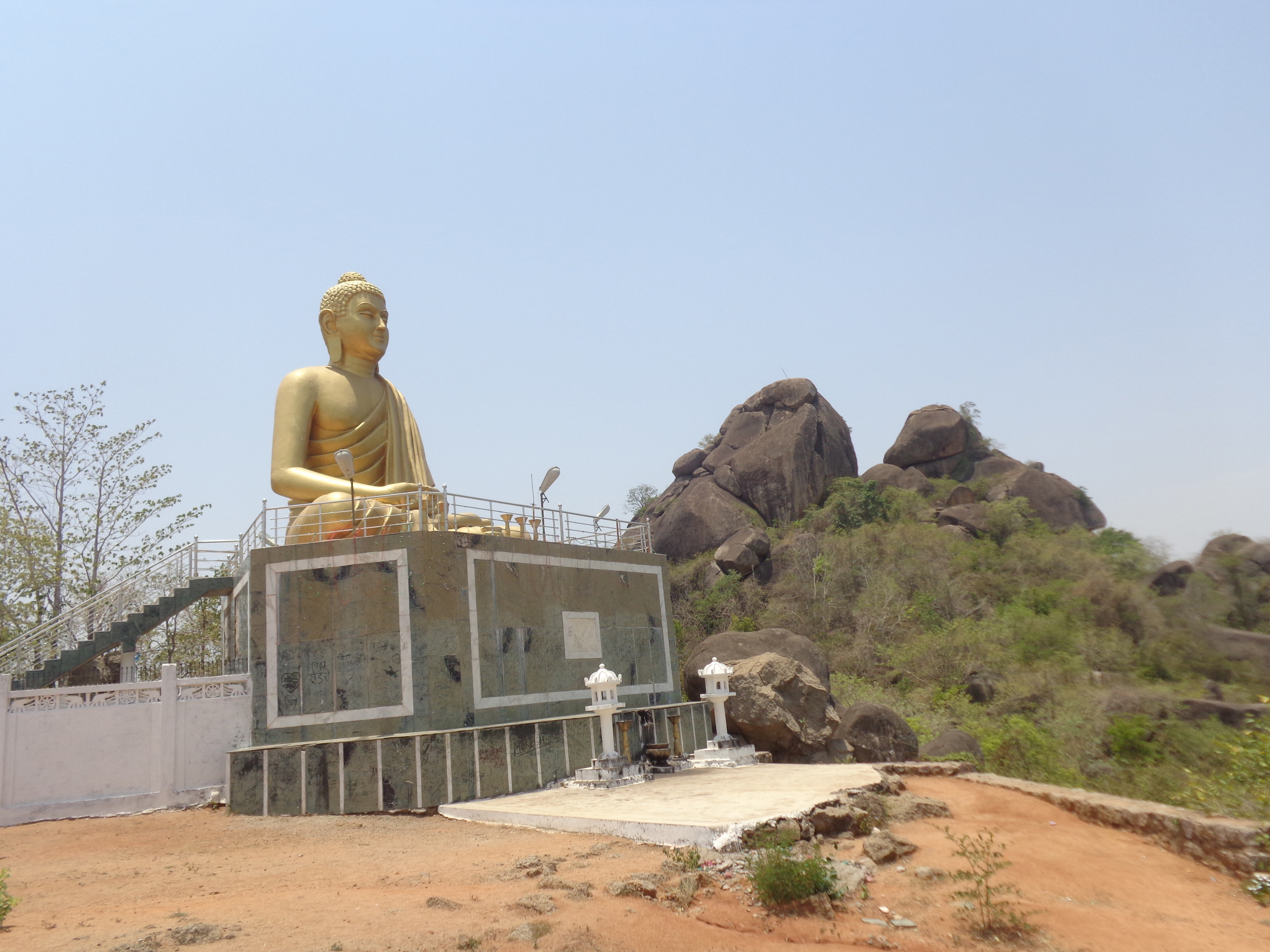
Alternate view of the statue

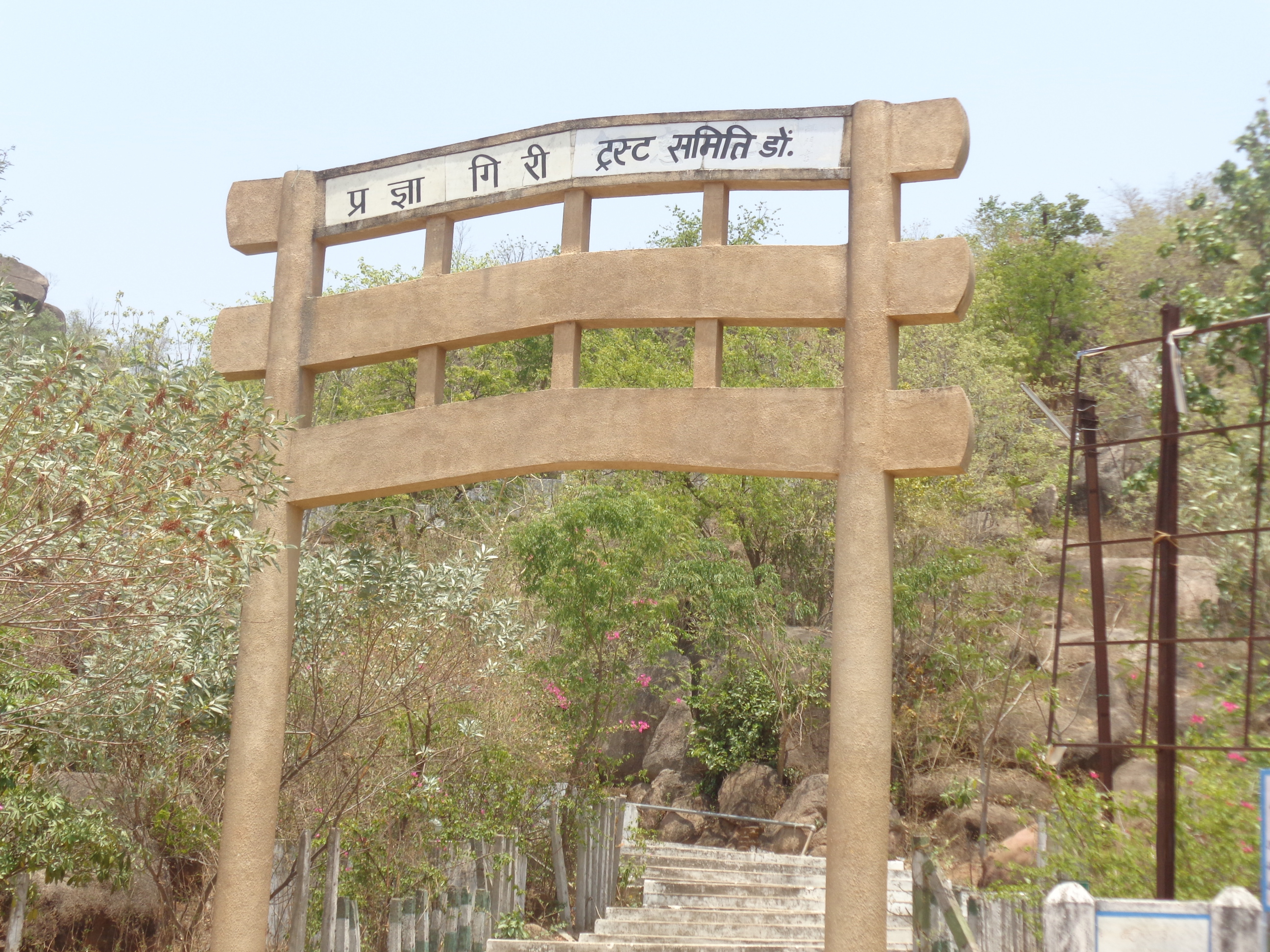
Entrance to Pragyagiri

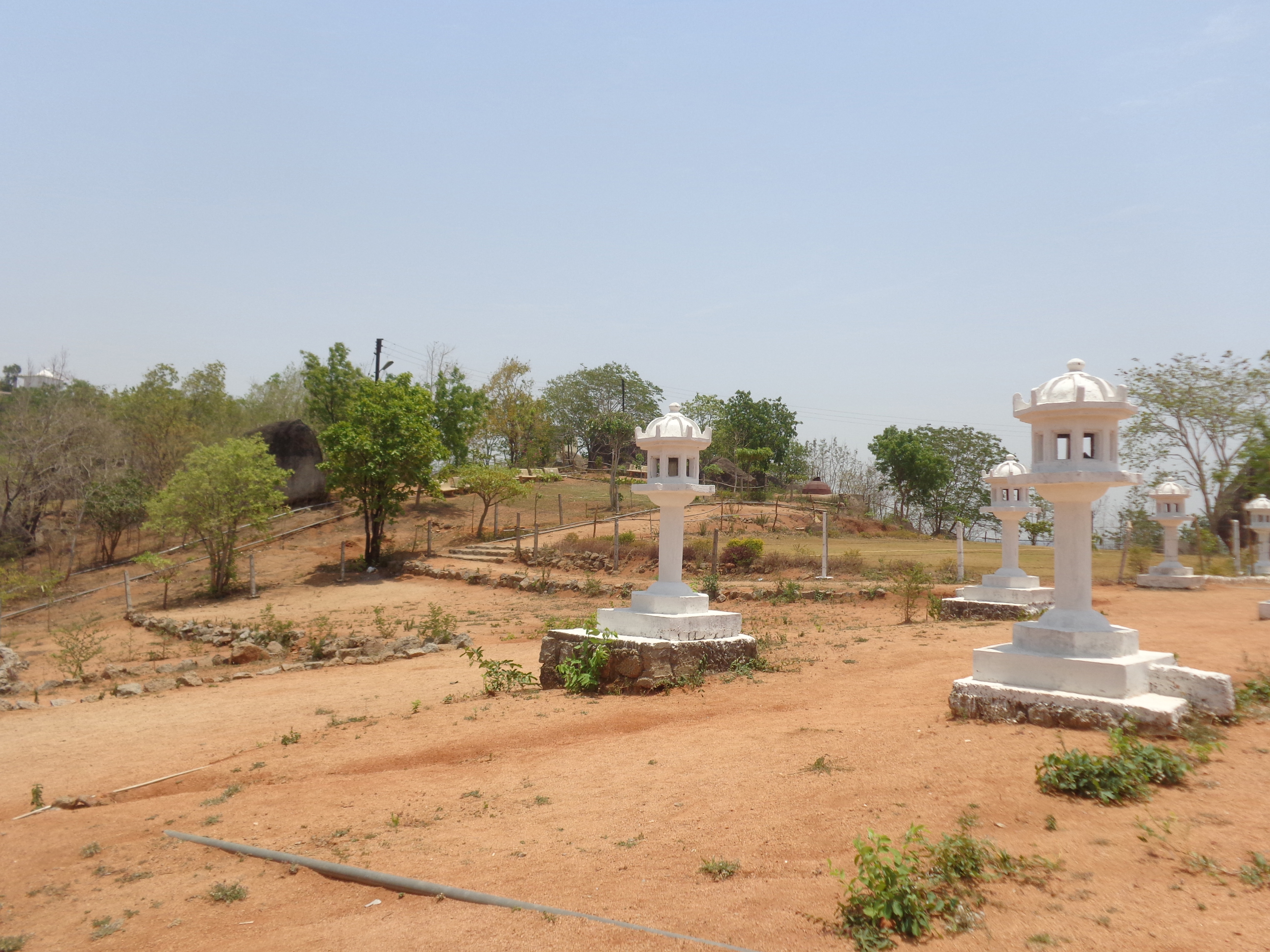
Garden at Pragyagiri

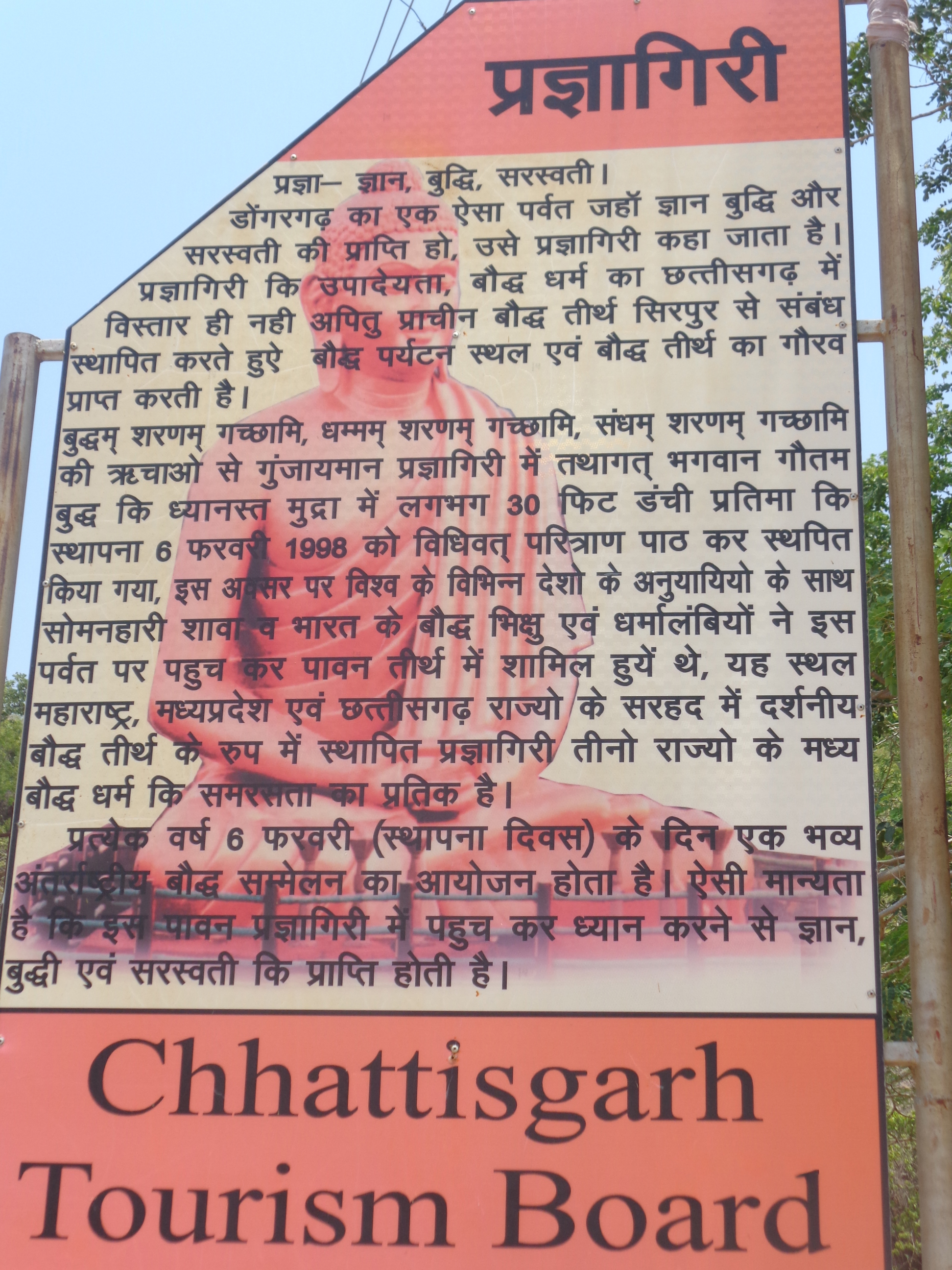
Stone board at Pragyagiri

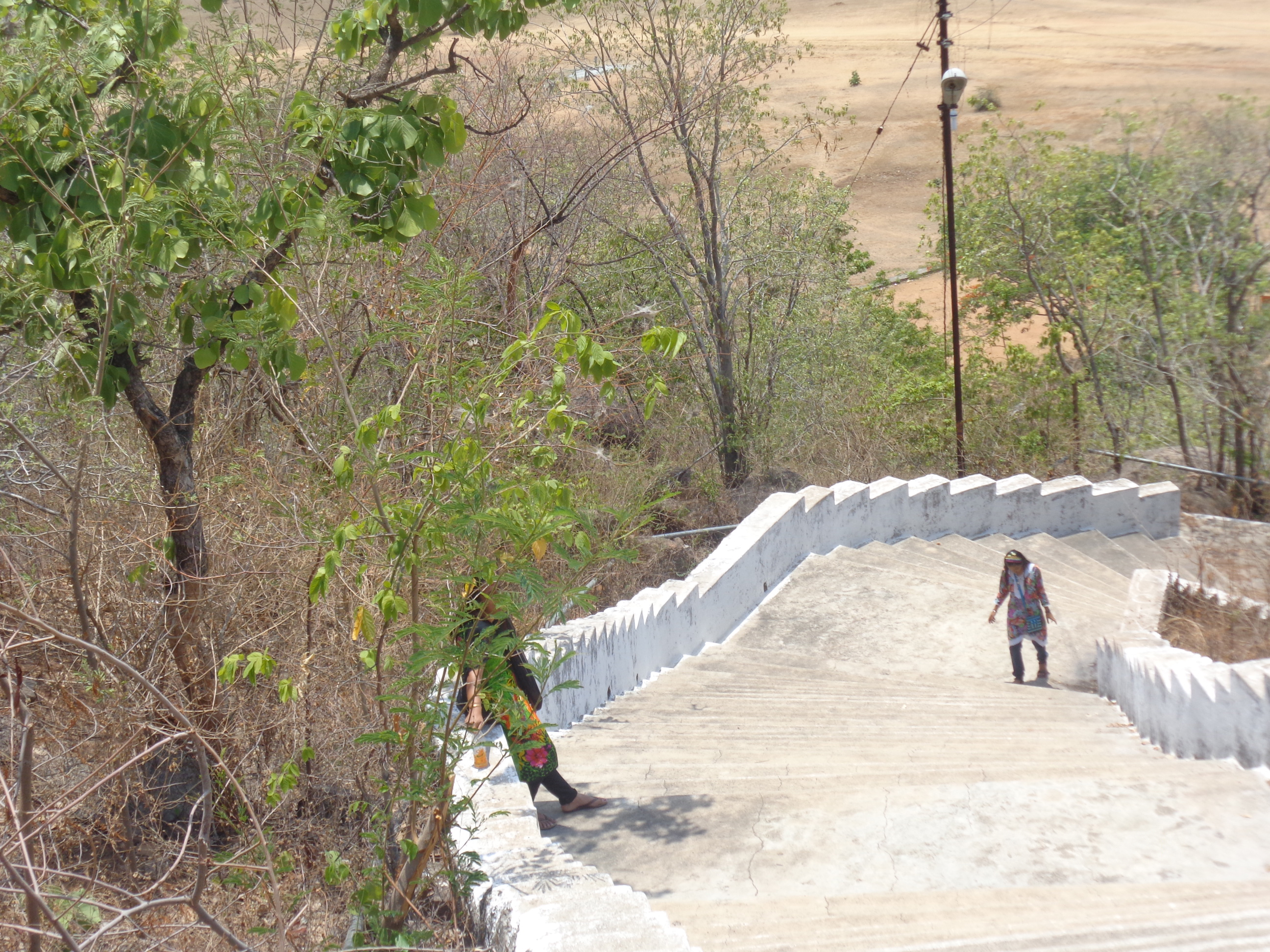
Path to Pragyagiri

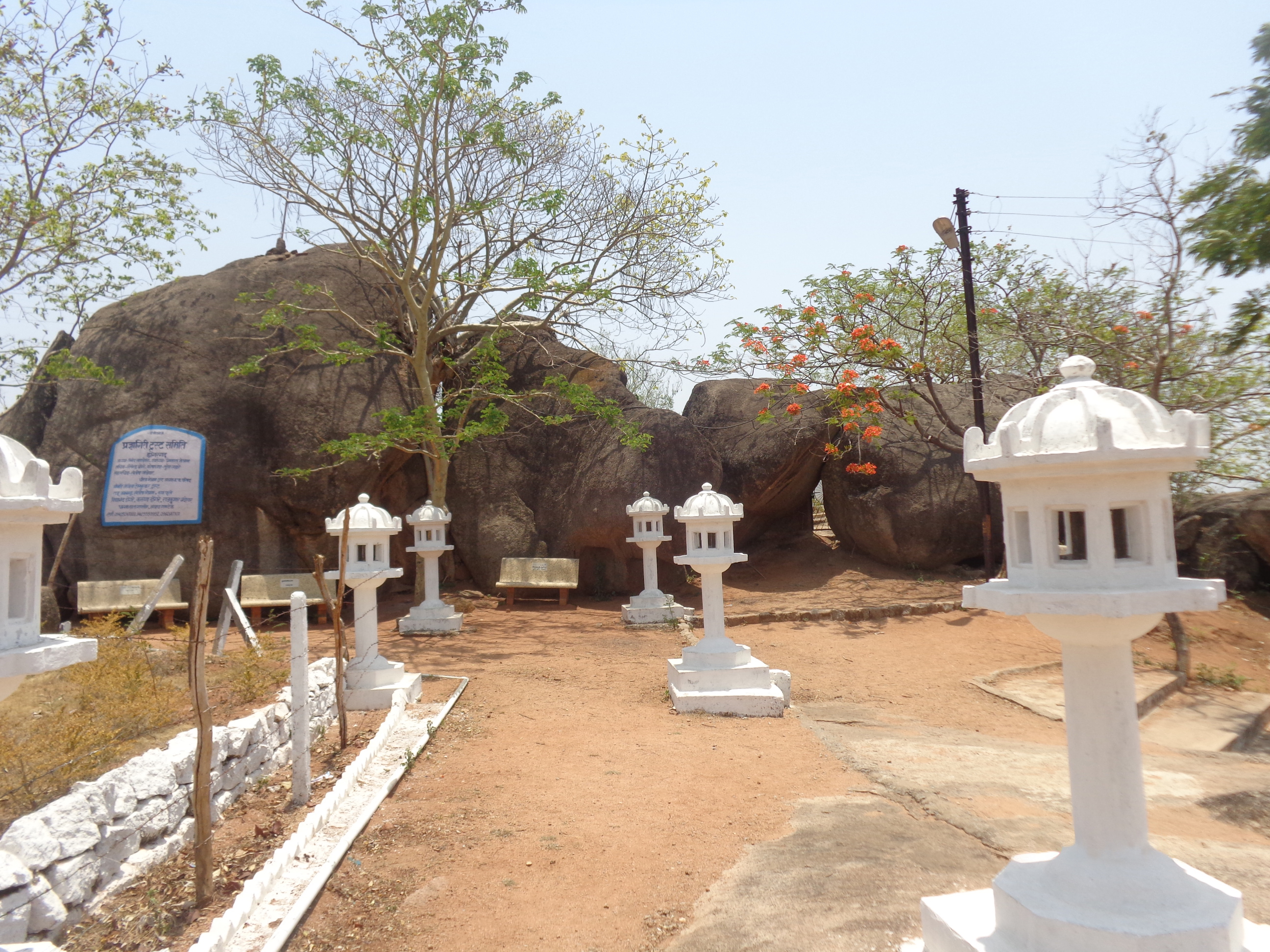
Garden at Pragyagiri

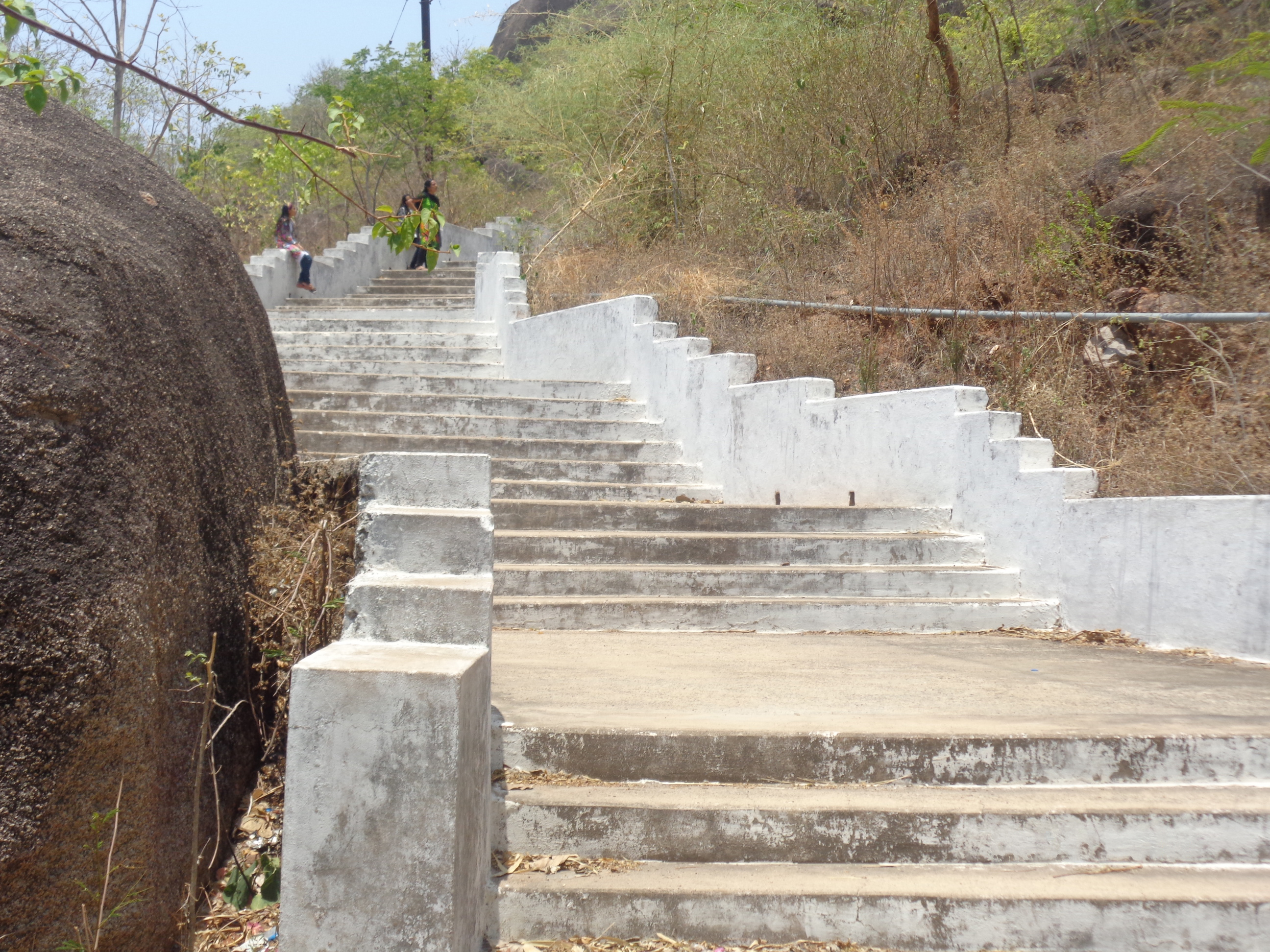
Steps to Pragyagiri

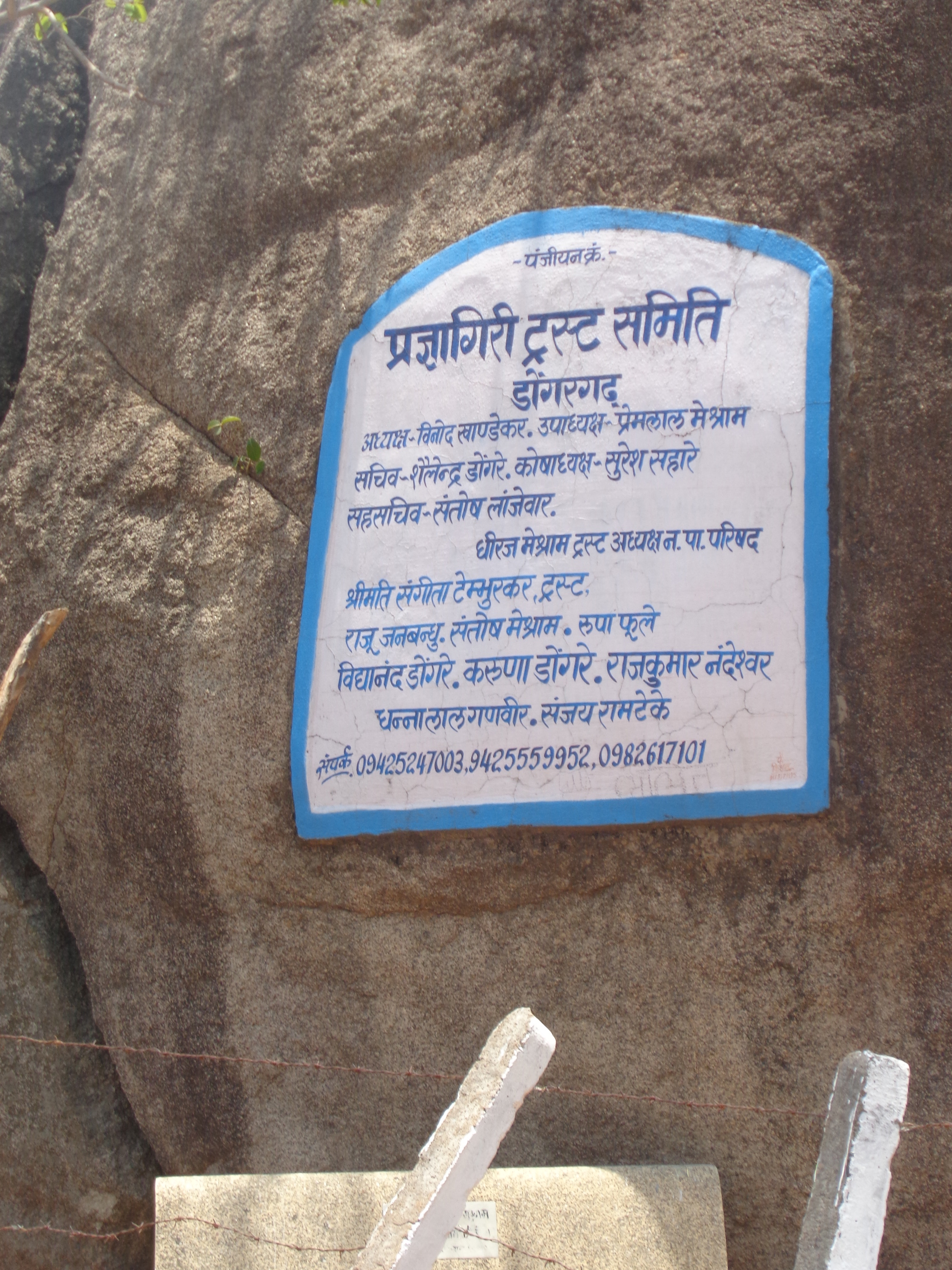
Notice on at Pragyagiri

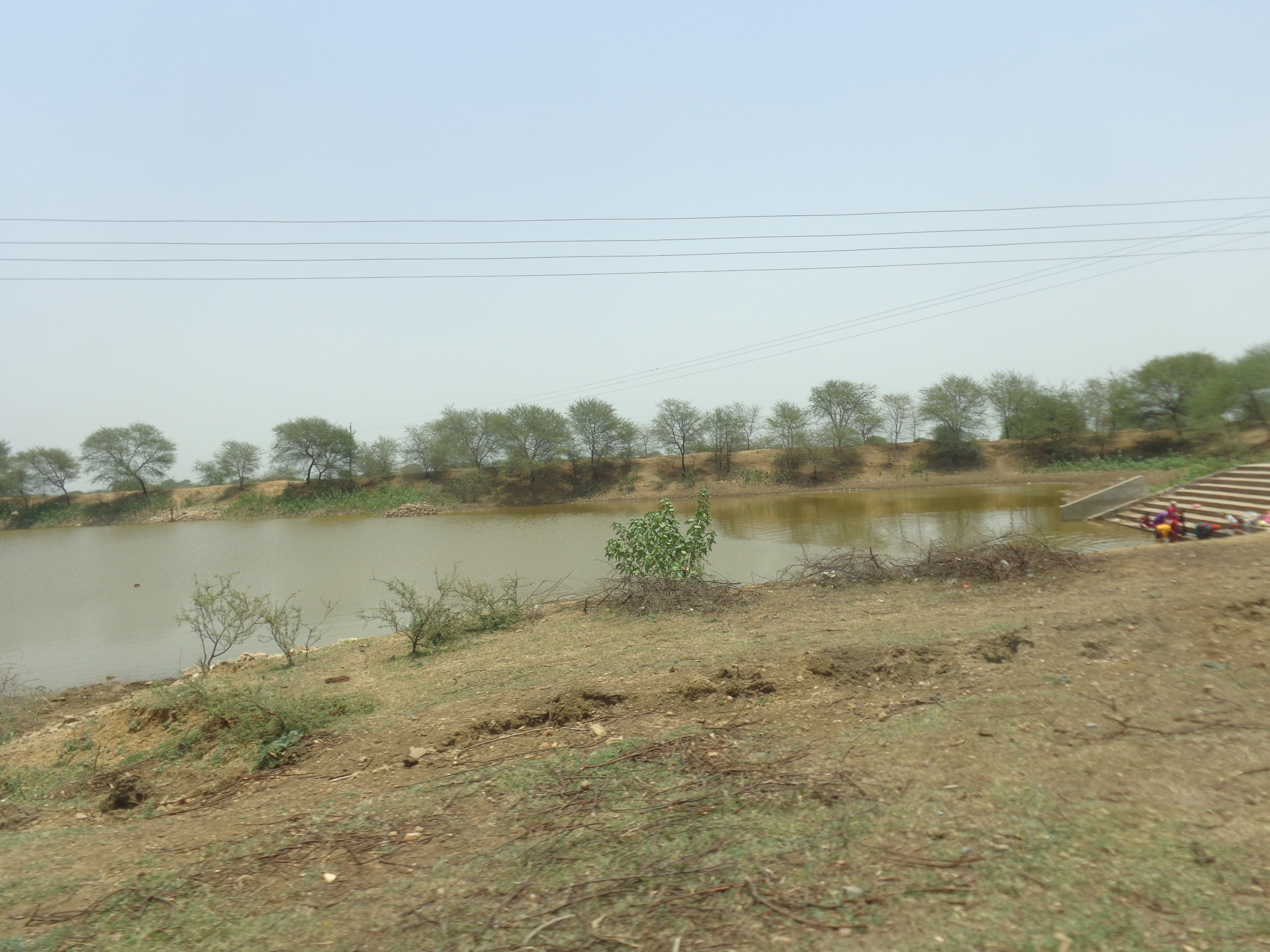
A view of a thalab

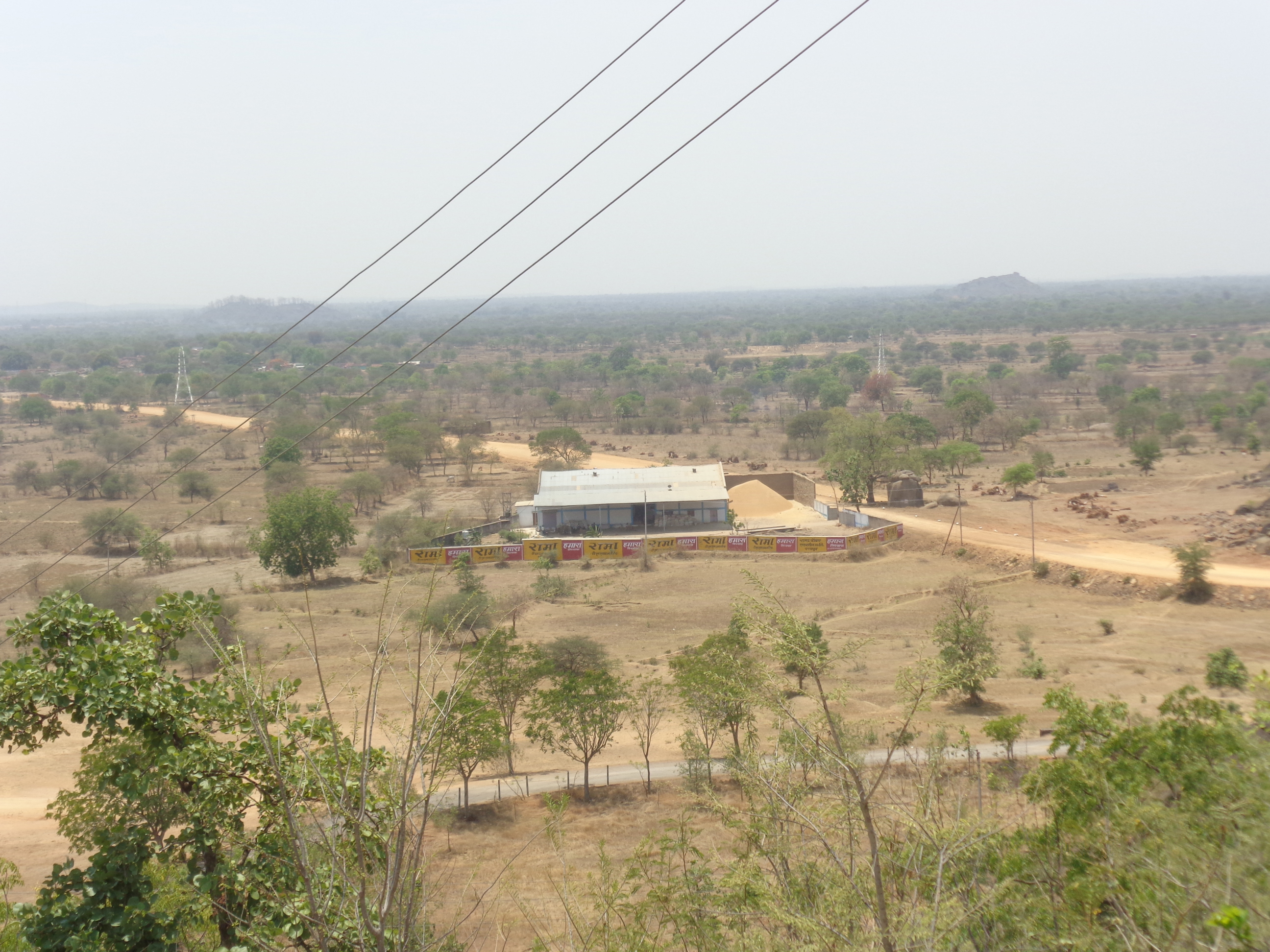
A view from Pragyagiri

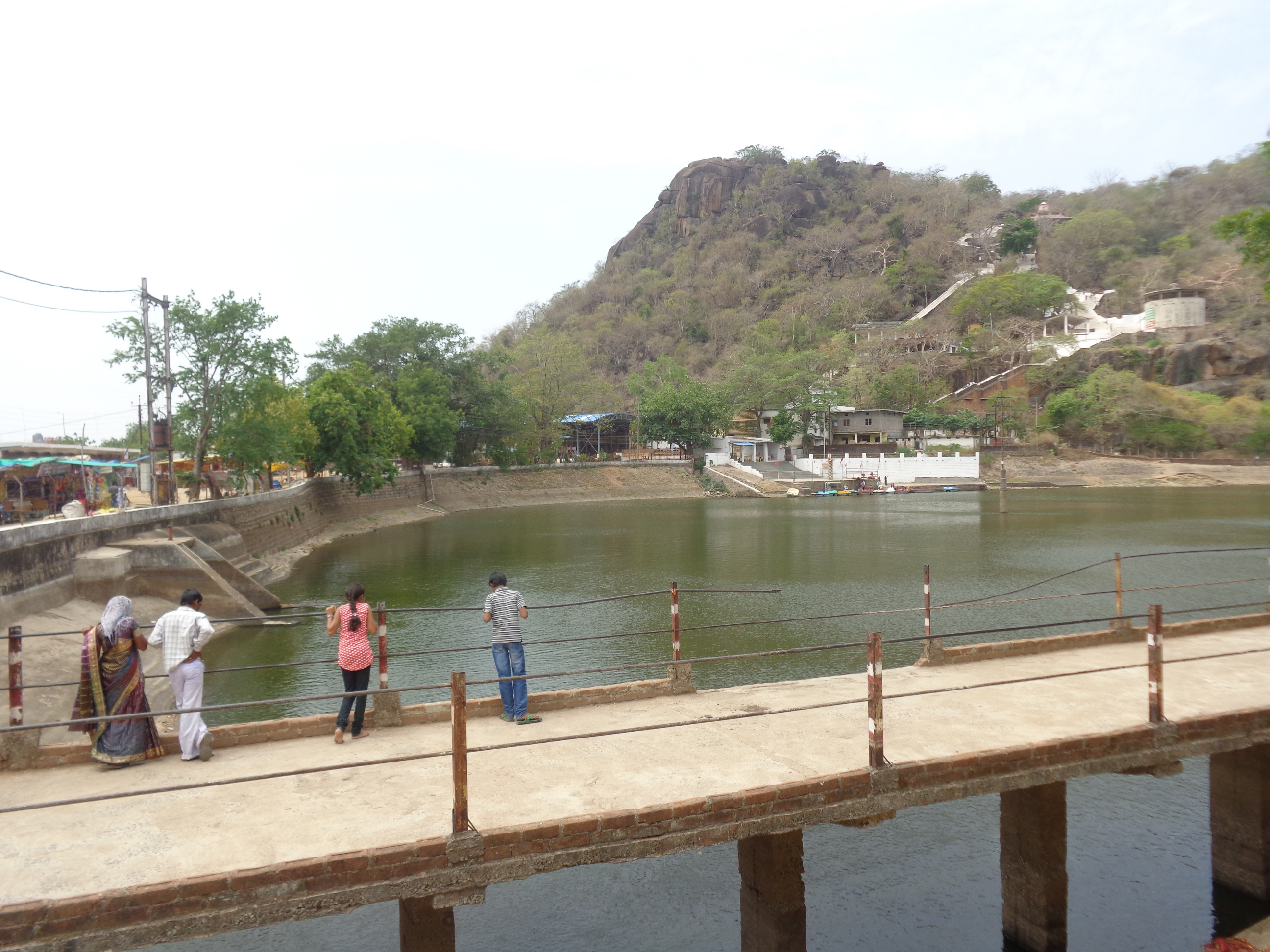
Path from Dongargarh to Bambleshwari temple

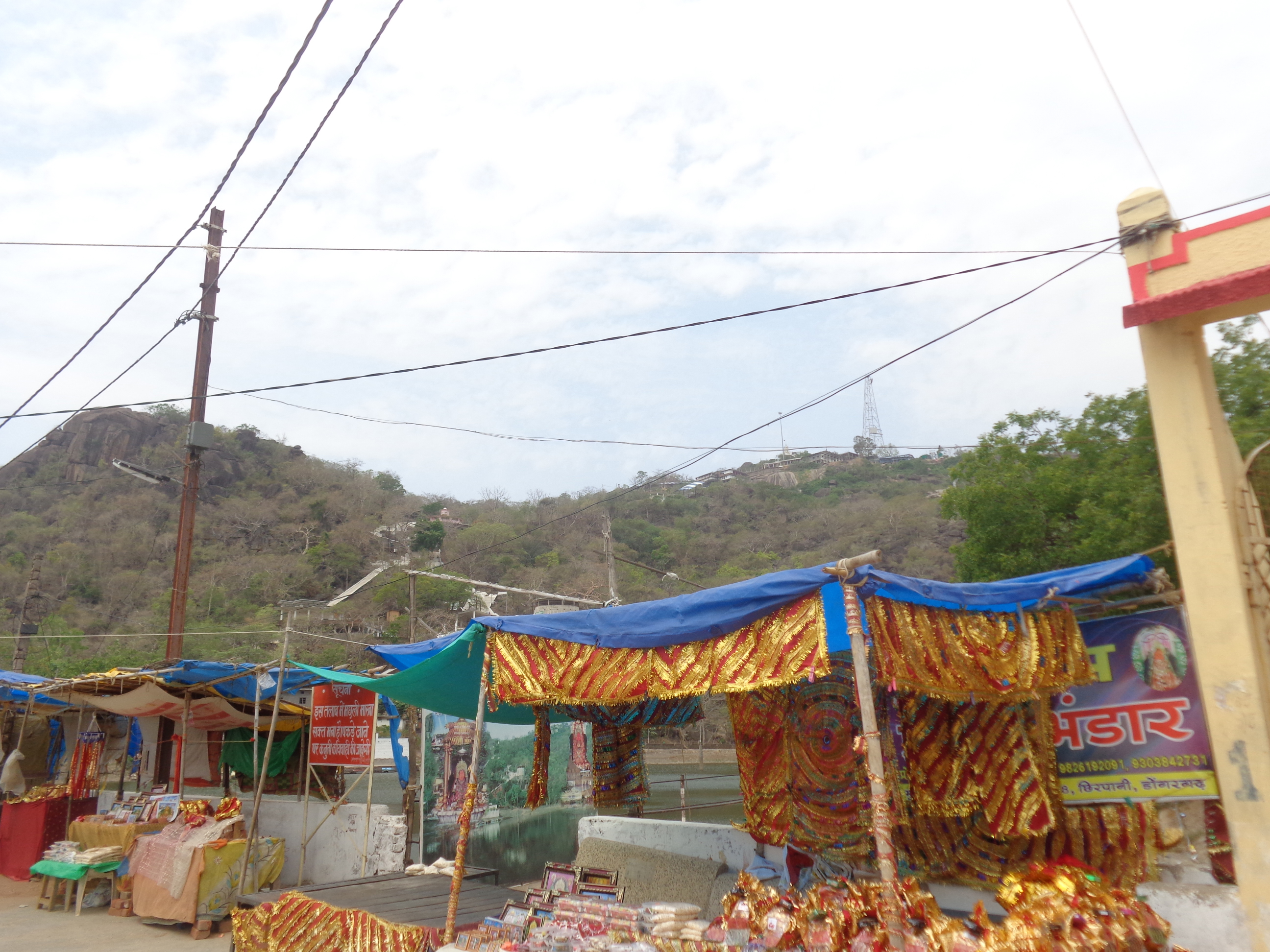
The town of dongargarh
