= Dudhawa Dam =

- Interactive map of Dudhawa Dam
- Official name: Dudhawa Dam
- Location: Kanker district, Chhattisgarh, India
- Coordinates: 20°18′28″N 81°46′18″E
- Construction began: 1953-54
- Opening date: 1963-64

Dam and spillways
- Impounds: Mahanadi River
- Height: 24.53 m
- Length: 2,906.43 m

Dudhawa Dam is located in Kanker district of Chhattisgarh in India. The construction of the dam began in 1953 and finished in 1964. It is built across the Mahanadi river in the village of Dudhawa, 21 km from Sihawa and 29 km from Kanker. The height of the dam is 24.53 m and the length 2,906.43 m. The reservoir has a catchment area of 625.27 km^{2}. This is one of earthen dams, of which right flank embankment, there is rest house.
