= Lakhanpuri =

- village
- Location in Chhattisgarh, India Lakhanpuri (India)
- Coordinates: 20°23′46″N 81°25′47″E
- Country: India
- State: Chhattisgarh
- District: Kanker
- Elevation: 358 m (1,175 ft)

Languages
  - Official: Hindi, Chhattisgarhi
- Time zone: UTC+5:30 (IST)
- PIN: 494336
- Vehicle registration: CG
- Coastline: 0 kilometres (0 mi)
- Nearest city: Kanker
- Lok Sabha constituency: Kanker

Lakhanpuri is a village in Kanker district of Chhattisgarh state of India.

== Geography ==
It is located at an elevation of 358 m above MSL.

== Location ==
National Highway 43 passes through Lakhanpuri. It is at a distance of 25 km from Kanker. The nearest airport is at Raipur.
