= Rewadih =

Rewadih is a village in the Rajnandgaon district of Chhattisgarh state of India.
