= Rajnandgaon district =

District of Chhattisgarh, India

- District of Chhattisgarh
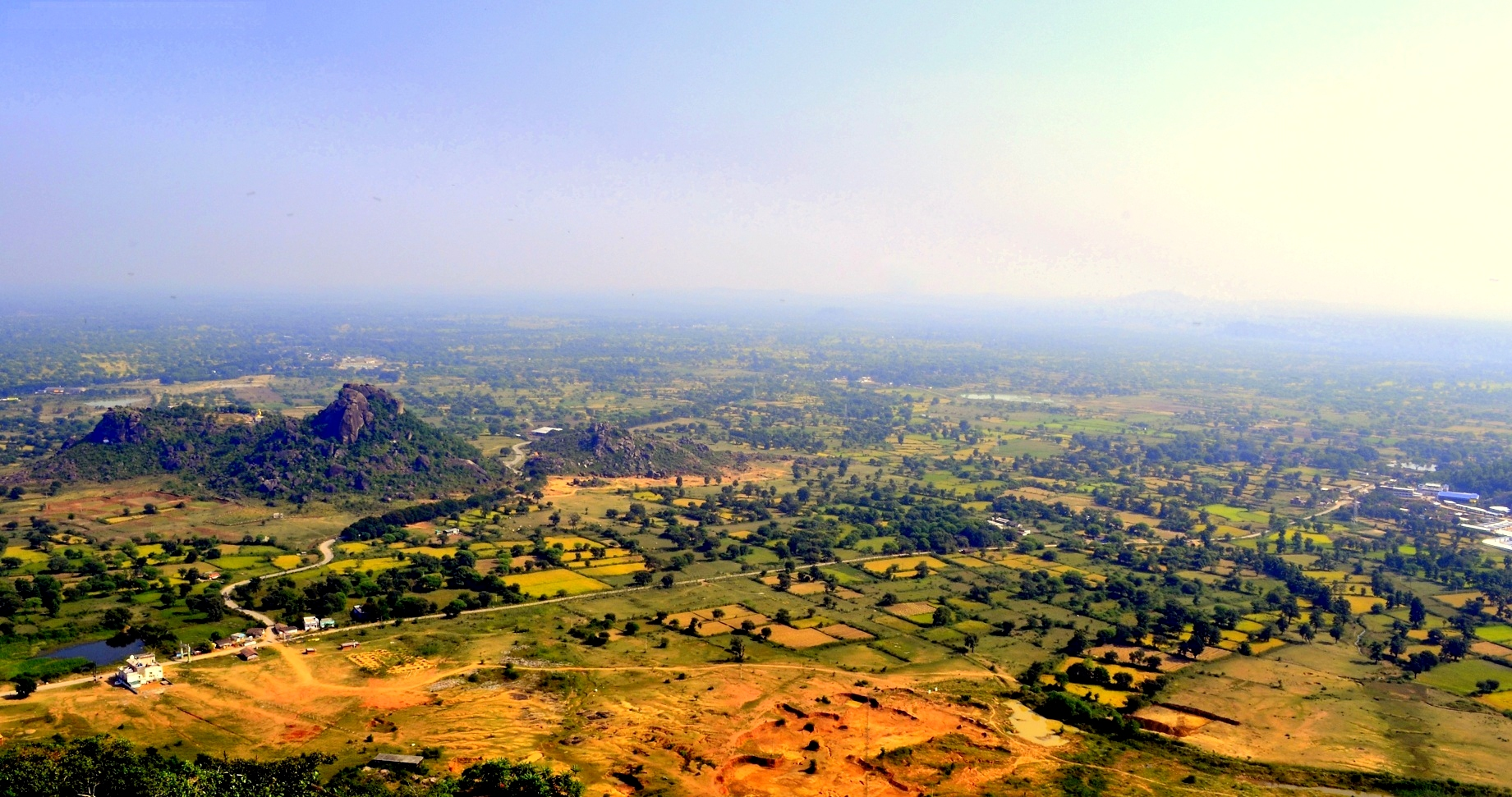
- View of Dongargarh from Maa Bamleshwari Devi Temple on a hilltop

- Location in Chhattisgarh
- Coordinates (Rajnandgaon): 21.10°N 81.03°E
- Country: India
- State: Chhattisgarh
- Division: Durg
- Headquarters: Rajnandgaon
- Tehsils: 4

Government
  - Lok Sabha constituencies: 1
  - Vidhan Sabha constituencies: 6

Area
  - Total: 8,070 km^{2} (3,120 sq mi)

Population (2011)
  - Total: 887,742
  - Density: 110/km^{2} (285/sq mi)
  - Urban: 219,688

Demographics
  - Literacy: 77.2 per cent
  - Sex ratio: 1023
- Time zone: UTC+05:30 (IST)
- Average annual precipitation: 1274 mm
- Website: rajnandgaon.nic.in

Rajnandgaon district is situated in the central Indian state of Chhattisgarh. The administrative headquarters of the district is Rajnandgaon town.

== History ==
In ancient times Rajnandgaon, like the rest of the Chhattisgarh plain, was part of Dakshina Kosala. The region was part of the Mauryan empire during Ashoka's time. Coins of the Indo-Sassanians have been found near Rajnandgaon dating from the 3rd century CE, implying the region had indirect contact with the rest of the world. In the 4th century CE, Dakshina Kosala was one of the regions which was subdued by Samudra Gupta on his southern expedition. However it was unlikely the Guptas ever directly controlled this territory south of the Mahanadi, rather the local rulers acknowledged Gupta overlordship. Gupta coins have been found in Dakshina Kosala. Parts of the region were controlled by the Nalas of Bastar at times, while others areas were controlled by the Vakatakas for periods in the 5th century CE.

In the 6th century CE, the area was under the control of the Somavamshis. In the 7th century however, the territory fell back into Nala hands.

In the 10th century CE, the Somavamshis returned to power. They were soon overthrown by the Kalachuris, who claimed Haihaiya origin. In the 12th and 13th centuries CE, the southern part of the district fell into the control of chieftains from Kanker. The Kalachuris or Haihaiyavansis continued ruling the district until the 18th century CE. Khairagarh and the northern part of the district was ruled by the Raj Gonds of Garha-Mandla. After the struggle of Rani Durgavati, these rulers, as well as the Kalachuris of Raipur who ruled the southern part of the district, became vassals of the Mughals.

In 1742, the Marathas under the Bhonsles of Napur invaded Chhattisgarh. The Maratha general, Bhaskar Pant, quickly overthrew the last king of the Haihaiyavansis and took over what is now Rajnandagaon district. In 1753, the Bhonsles of Nagpur confiscated all the territory that is now Chhattisgarh, and Raghoji gave the area to his son, Bimbaji, who ruled it virtually independently.

The territory continued to be controlled by the Marathas until the Third Anglo-Maratha War, when it fell into British hands. In 1818, Dongargarh revolted against the British, but was quickly crushed. The British balanced the accounts of the Marathas and then returned the territory to Maratha hands. Until 1836 it was administered by a series of subadars obedient to the Nagpur state. In 1853, Nagpur was annexed by the British under the Doctrine of Lapse and Rajnandgaon fell under direct British administration under the Central Provinces and Berar.

In 1906, Thakur Pyarelal Singh promoted the Swadeshi movement in the district. Later, he helped organize mill workers in Rajnandgaon in a successful 34-day strike after the passage of the Rowlatt Act. For this he was punished by the authorities of Rajnandgaon state, but later wrote to the British agent to get the order cancelled. The people of the princely states participated in all the major events of the Independence movement, including the Civil Disobedience Movement, that saw the British officials pass orders to quell the movement. In 1939, the people of Rajnandgaon state launched a Forest Satyagraha, in which the police fired on protestors, killing one.

The Rajnandgaon remained a Princely State in independent India. In 1948, the princely state and the capital city Rajnandgaon was merged into the Durg District of Madhya Bharat, later Madhya Pradesh. Rajnandgaon district was carved out from the erstwhile Durg district on 26 January 1973. Later, Kabirdham district was carved out from this district on 1 July 1998.

It is a part of the Red Corridor.

The collector of Rajnandgaon is Shri Doman Singh.

== Geography ==
The district covers an area of 8222 km^{2}. The district borders Kabirdham district in the north, Bemetara, Durg and Balod districts in the east, Kanker district in the south, Balaghat district of Madhya Pradesh and Gondia and Gadchiroli districts of Maharashtra in the west.

Most of the district is in the Chhattisgarh plain. This plain comprises two watersheds: that of the Wainganga in the west, and that of the Mahanadi in the east. The Shivnath, main tributary of the Mahanadi, has its source in the district, and flows through the central plain into Durg district. In the northwest, bordering Balaghat and Kabirdham districts, is the Maikal Hills, the eastern extension of the Satpuras. In the far south is the northernmost extension of the Bastar Plateau. Both the hills and plateau are sparsely populated with a majority-tribal population and retain thick forest cover, which has generally been lost in the rest of the district.

== Demographics ==
Religions in Rajnandgaon district (2011)
Religion	Percent
Hinduism	93.80%
Buddhism	2.06%
Islam	1.89%
Other (tribal religion)	0.73%
Other or not stated	0.52%
Distribution of religions

According to the 2011 census Rajnandgaon district has a population of 1,537,133, roughly equal to the nation of Gabon or the US state of Hawaii. This gives it a ranking of 325th in India (out of a total of 640). The district has a population density of 191 inhabitants per square kilometre (490/sq mi) . Its population growth rate over the decade 2001-2011 was 19.82%. Rajnandgaon has a sex ratio of 1017 females for every 1000 males, and a literacy rate of 76.97%. After bifurcation the district had a population of 884,742, of which 219,688 (24.83%) live in urban areas. The residual district has a sex ratio of 1010 females per 1000 males. Scheduled Castes and Scheduled Tribes make up 95,782 (10.83%) and 174,731 (19.75%) of the population respectively.

The main Scheduled Castes are Chamar and Mahar, which make up 91% of the Scheduled Castes population. The main Scheduled Tribes are the Gonds, other major tribes are the Kawar and Halba. These three tribes make up 97% of the total Scheduled Tribes population.

Languages of Rajnandgaon district (2011)
1. Chhattisgarhi (82.4%)
2. Hindi (13.3%)
3. Marathi (1.73%)
4. Others (2.64%)

At the time of the 2011 Census of India, 82.37% of the population in the district spoke Chhattisgarhi, 13.26% Hindi and 1.73% Marathi as their first language.

== Tourist destinations ==
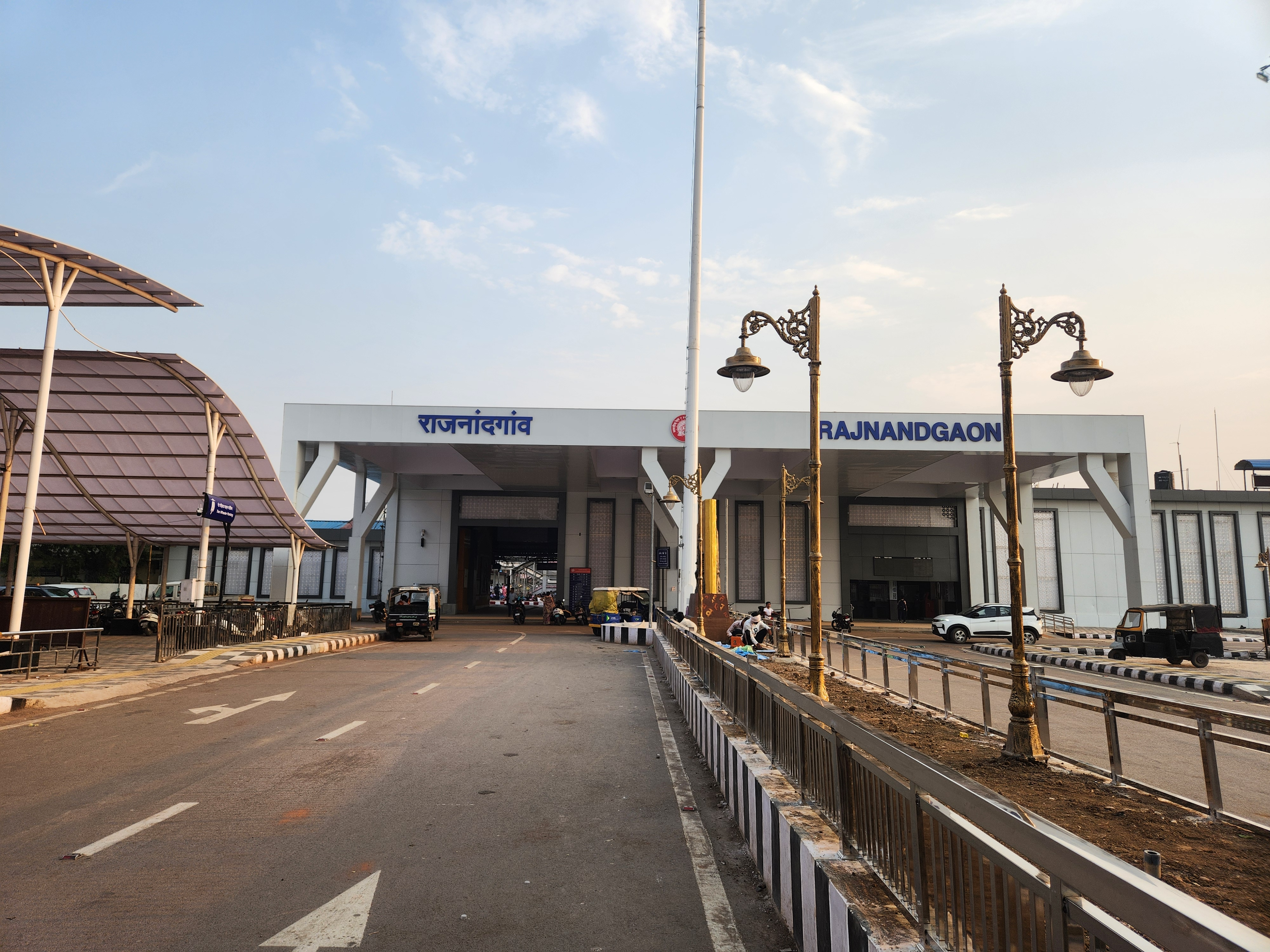
Car Parking & Main entrance of railway station building at Rajnandgaon Railway Station, Chattisgarh, 2026

A tehsil headquarters, Dongargarh, is the main tourist as well as pilgrimage site of the district. The famous temple of Goddess Bamleshwari, on a hilltop of 1,600 feet (490 m) in the town of Dongargarh, is referred to as Badi Bamleshwari. Another temple, at ground level, is situated about 1/2 km from the main temple complex. This temple is known as Chhoti Bamleshwari. Many hundreds of thousands of people from in and around Chhattisgarh flock to the shrine during the navratris of Kavar (during Dussera) and Chaitra (during Ramnavmi). During these navratris, melas (fairs) which run 24 hours, are organised in the premises of the temple.

Another site of interest is the ancient place of Mata Sheetala Devi Shakti Peetha. This temple, which dates from 2200 years ago, lies 1.5 km from the railway station. The Mandir Trust has organised the Mela of Maa Bamleshwari and a lot of devotees visit during the Mela period. Chotti Mata Mandir reconstruction in famous pink sandstone and marble stone. Pragyagiri, a famous Buddhist Vihara is another attraction of this district. Barfani dham at Rajnandgaon town is another place of pilgrims widely visited. Other places are: Ambagarh Chowki, Ambagarh Devi Mandir, Mongara Dam, Sankar Dahara Tipagarh Pahadi.

== Villages ==
- Rewadih
