= Sarona, Chhattisgarh =

Village in Chhattisgarh, India

Sarona
- Village
- Location within Chhattisgarh Location within India
- Coordinates: 21°14′56″N 81°34′44″E
- Country: India
- State: Chhattisgarh
- District: Kanker
- Tehsil: Narharpur
- Elevation: 283 m (928 ft)

Population (2011)
  - Total: 3,097
- Time zone: UTC+5:30 (IST)
- PIN: 494335

Sarona is a village of Narharpur Tehsil, Kanker District, Chhattisgarh, India. In the year 2011, there are 3,097 inhabitants under its administration.

== Demographics ==
According to the 2011 Indian Census, the village has a population of 3,097. Of those, 1,488 are male residents and 1,609 are female residents. The literacy rate is at 66.52%, with 1,100 of the male population being literate, and 960 of the female population being literate.
