= Smita Tandi =

Indian police constable and activist

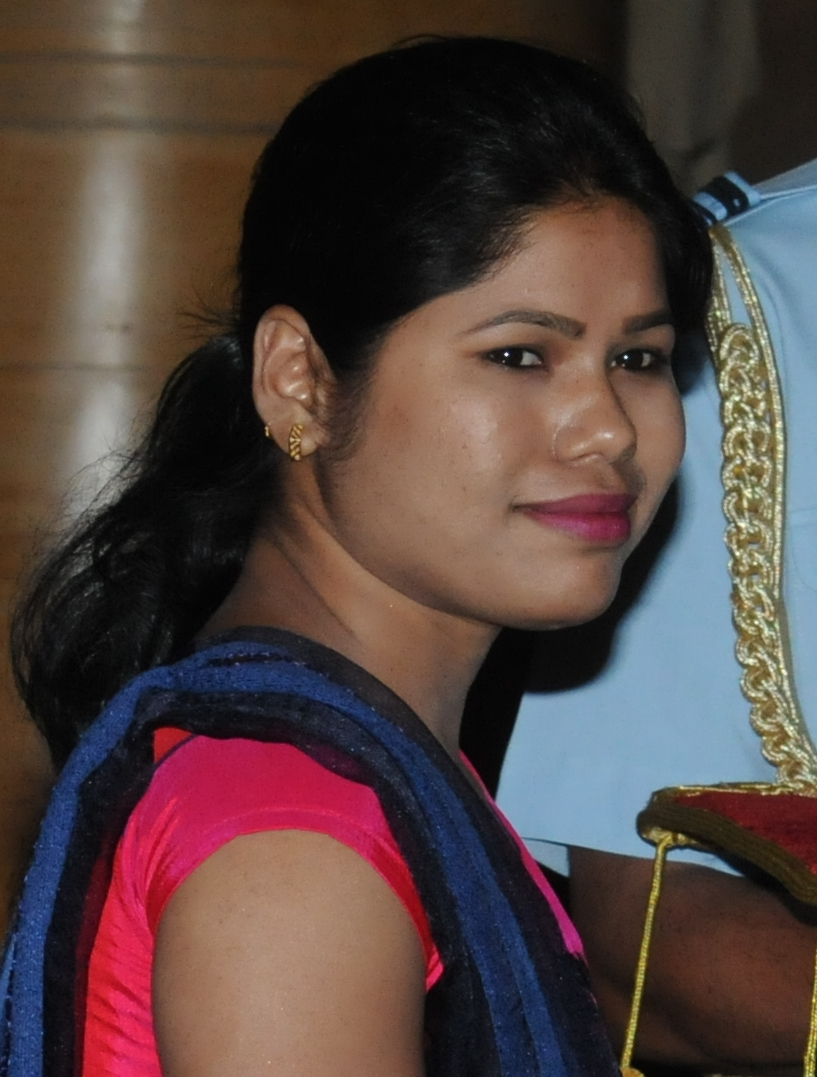
- Tandi receives the 2016 Nari Shakti Puraskar
- Occupation: Police constable
- Employer: Indian Police Service
- Known for: Facebook activism

Smita Tandi (born c. 1992) is an Indian police constable in the state of Chhattisgarh. She set up a fund to help people unable to pay for medical treatment and received the 2016 Nari Shakti Puraskar in recognition of her humanitarian efforts.

== Career ==
Smita Tandi works as a police constable. In 2013 her father, who had also worked for the police, became ill and died when her family could not afford to pay for treatment. In his memory, Tandi set up a fund called Jeevandeep for people unable to access medical treatment. She opened a Facebook account to promote the fund in 2015 and twenty months later had almost 7.2 lakh (720,000) followers. When Tandi receives a request for help, she visits the person and if the story is true, she then posts about it on Facebook and makes an appeal for funds.

Tandi received the 2016 Nari Shakti Puraskar in recognition of her humanitarian efforts. After her superiors heard about her activism, Tandi was moved to a position dealing with social media complaints on the Bhilai women’s helpline.

== Personal life ==
Smita Tandi was born c. 1992 and lives in Durg, a city in the Indian state of Chhattisgarh. She represents Chhattisgarh at volleyball. In 2018, Tandi reported an incident of sexual harassment on a train between Bilaspur and Bhatapara. Her assailant was arrested by the Railway Protection Force.
