= Kanker district =

Uttar Bastar Kanker district
- District of Chhattisgarh
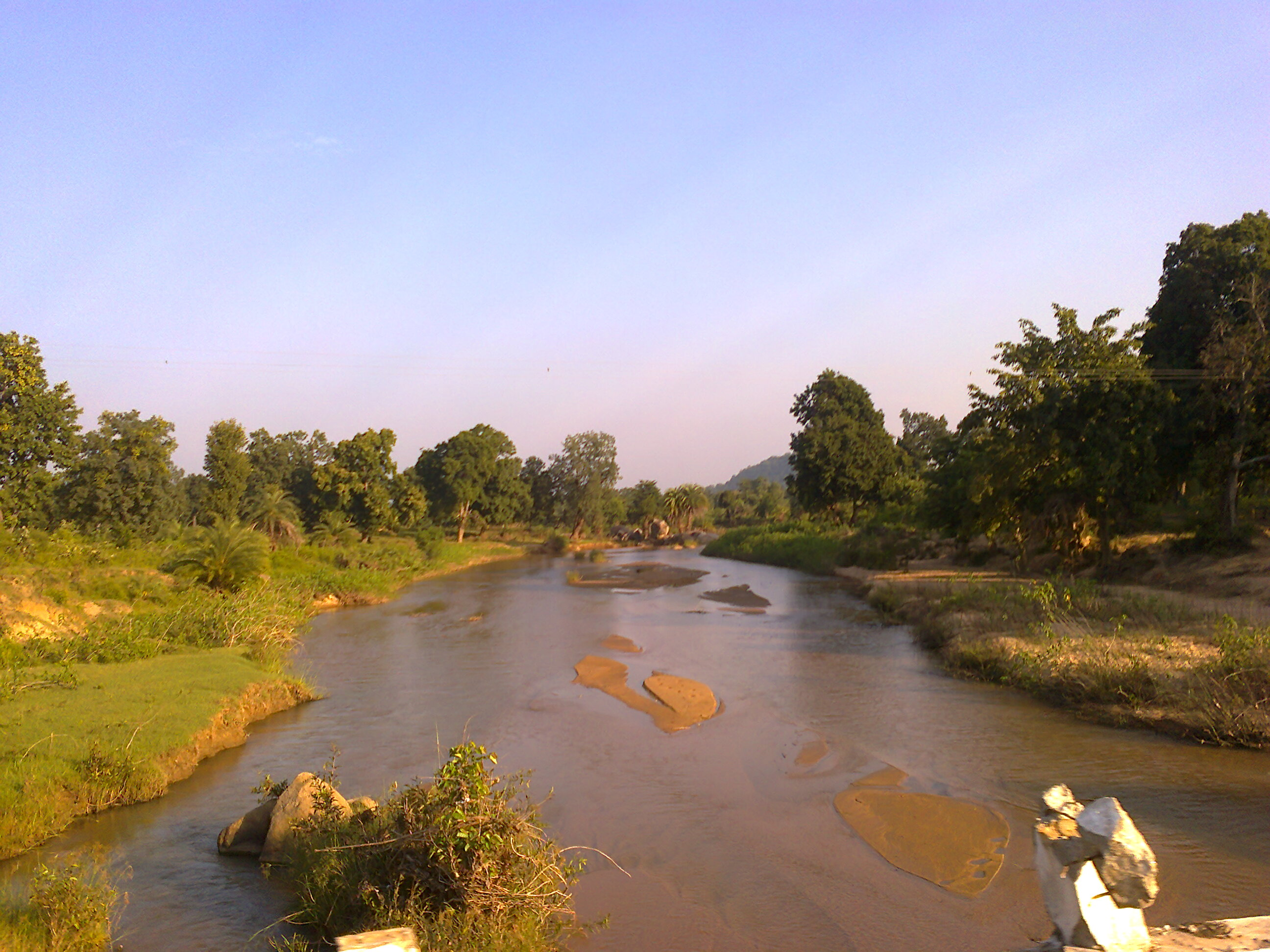
- Tributary of Dood river near Kanker
- Interactive map of Uttar Bastar Kanker district
- Coordinates (Kanker): 20°16′19″N 81°29′35″E
- Country: India
- State: Chhattisgarh
- Division: Bastar
- Headquarters: Kanker
- Tehsils: 11

Government
  - Type: Collector - Abhijit Singh (IAS) Superintendent of Police - Divyang Patel (IPS) [Divisional Forest Officer]] - Raunak Goyal (IFS)
  - Lok Sabha constituencies: 1 (Kanker-ST)
  - Vidhan Sabha constituencies: 3 (Antagarh, Bhanupratappur, Kanker)

Area
  - Total: 6,432 km^{2} (2,483 sq mi)

Population (2001)
  - Total: 748,941
  - Density: 116.4/km^{2} (301.6/sq mi)
- Time zone: UTC+05:30 (IST)
- PIN: 494xxx (Kanker)
- Vehicle registration: CG 19
- Major highways: NH-30
- Website: kanker.gov.in

Uttar Bastar Kanker district is located in the southern region of the state of Chhattisgarh, India between latitudes 20.6-20.24 and longitudes 80.48-81.48. The district covers an area of 6432 square kilometers and has a population of 748,941.

The district headquarters, Kanker town, is situated on the National Highway 30 almost halfway between Chhattisgarh's two major cities - Raipur, the state capital, and Jagdalpur, the second biggest city and headquarters of the neighbouring Bastar district and Bastar Division.

== History ==
The history of Kanker is said to date back to the Stone Age. According to the legendary Sanskrit epics of India, the Ramayana and the Mahabharata, there was once a dense forest area named Dandakaranya, in the region where Kanker is located. According to myth, Kanker was also a land of monks and sages. Many Rishis (monks/sages) such as Kank, Lomesh, Shringi, Angira were said to have lived here. The influence of Buddhism in the region is believed to have begun in the sixth century BC. Ancient accounts of Kanker state that records it remained an independent state for much of its history.

In 106 AD, the Kanker state was under the rule of the Satavahana dynasty with Satkarni, as its king. This fact is also described by Chinese visitor Xuanzang. After Satvahana rule, the state was under the control of the Nags, Vakataks, Gupt, Nal and Chalukya dynasties. The Som dynasty was founded by the king Singh Raj, and this dynasty ruled the state from 1125 to 1344. Following the decline of the Som dynasty, Dharam Dev founded the Kandra dynasty, which ruled until 1385. After the downfall of the Kandra dynasty, the Chandra dynasty came. According to a local tradition, its first king was Veer Kanhar Dev, who ruled until 1404. This dynasty ruled the state up to 1802. In more recent years, the Kanker region has been affected by violence associated with Naxalite groups, including the Communist Party of India (Maoist).

=== Kanker State ===
The Kanker state came under the control of the Bhosales of Nagpur during the reign of Bhoop Dev from 1809 to 1818. During the kingship of Narhari Deb, the Kanker state came under control of the British after the Maratha period. The British government recognised Narhar Dev right of adoption, and he subsequently acknowledged British suzerainty. In 1882, the control of Kanker State was handed over to the Commissioner of Raipur.

The rule of Narhar Deo saw the construction of many buildings, including a palace near Gadiya Mountain, a printing press, a library, Radhakrishna Temple, Ramjanki Temple, Jagannath Temple and Balaji Temple. Narhar Deo made a plan termed 'Ratna Bhandar' for keeping grain in stock for his people. He established a new town named Narharpur near Kanker.

In 1904, Komal Dev became the king of Kanker. During his rule one English secondary school, one Girls school, and 15 primary Schools were established, as well as two hospitals: one in Kanker and the other in Sambalpur. He died on 8 January 1925. After his death, Bhanupratap Dev became the king. Bhanupratap Dev was the last king of Kanker before the Independence of India. After independence, he was elected twice as an MLA from the Kanker constituency.

=== Rajas/Zamindars ===
- 5 Dec 1853 - May 1903 Narhar Deo
- 1903 - 8 Jan 1925 Lal Kamal Deo
- 8 Jan 1925 - 15 Aug 1947 Bhanupratap Deo (b. 1922)

=== Post-independence ===
What is now Kanker District was a part of old Bastar district. In 1999, Kanker received its identity as an independent district. It is now surrounded by five other districts of Chhattisgarh state: Kondagaon District, Dhamtari District, Balod District, Narayanpur and Rajnandgaon District.

It is currently a part of the Red Corridor, the region in the eastern, central and the southern parts of India that experience considerable Naxalite–Maoist insurgency.

== Demographics ==
Historical population
Year	Pop.	±% p.a.
1901	87,748	—
1911	119,905	+3.17%
1921	126,079	+0.50%
1931	141,373	+1.15%
1941	167,588	+1.72%
1951	195,482	+1.55%
1961	258,593	+2.84%
1971	370,295	+3.66%
1981	443,508	+1.82%
1991	548,476	+2.15%
2001	650,934	+1.73%
2011	748,941	+1.41%

Religions in Kanker district (2011)
Religion	Percent
Hinduism	83.78%
Other (tribal religion)	14.14%
Islam	0.81%
Christianity	0.54%
Other or not stated	0.73%

According to the 2011 census Kanker district has a population of 748,941, roughly equal to the nation of Guyana or the US state of Alaska. This gives it a ranking of 493rd in India (out of a total of 640). The district has a population density of 115 inhabitants per square kilometre (300/sq mi). Its population growth rate over the decade 2001-2011 was 15%. Kanker has a sex ratio of 1007 females for every 1000 males, and a literacy rate of 70.97%. 10.25% of the population lives in urban areas. Scheduled Castes and Scheduled Tribes make up 4.21% and 55.38% of the population respectively.

Languages of Kanker district (2011)
1. Chhattisgarhi (50.8%)
2. Halbi (27.1%)
3. Gondi (13.1%)
4. Hindi (5.71%)
5. Bengali (1.71%)
6. Kurukh (0.40%)
7. Others (1.26%)

At the time of the 2011 Census of India, 50.76% of the population in the district spoke Chhattisgarhi, 27.06% Halbi, 13.10% Gondi, 5.71% Hindi and 1.71% Bengali as their first language.

== Geography ==
The district headquarters of Kanker is 140 kilometers from Raipur and 160 kilometers from Jagadalpur. In 2018, the district got its first railway station in the form of Bhanupratappur railway station. Daily DEMU services connect Keoti and Bhanupratappur to Raipur.

The Mahanadi River, Doodh River, Hatkul River, Sondur River and Turu River all flow through small pockets of hills in the district.

The physical area of Kanker is heterogeneous and is a mix between flat land and undulating hills. Most of the land is between 300 and 600 meters above sea level, and about 80% of the area of Kanker is flat. These flat lands can be divided into two parts, the Mahanadi Plane and the Kotri Plane.

The northeastern part of Kanker is on the Mahanadi Plane. The majority of this plane lies at an elevation less than 500 meters above sea level. The main river in that area is the Mahanadi River. Hatkul, Chinar, Doodh, Sondur, Nakti, and Toori are the other rivers of the area. Bhanupratappur is located on the Kotri Plane. The majority of this plane lies at an elevation less than 400 meters above sea level. Korti and Valler are the main rivers of this area. The topography of Kanker district is also dotted with a multitude of hilly regions. These can be divided into the following three groups:

A. Vindhyana Hill Group: These hill groups are spread in the south eastern part of Kanker district, where the soil constitutes six phases of quartile and sand.

B. Archian Hill Groups: 95% of the area of Kanker is covered by Archian Hill Group. In this area, granite and gneiss rocks are spread over almost all the geographical area of the district.

C. Dharwar Hill Group: This hill group is very crude and broken in shape and form. These hills are spread all over the northern region of the district, in the areas close to Sambalpur and Bhanupratappur.

=== Climate ===
The climate of the district is of predominantly a “Monsoon type”. May is the hottest month and December is the coolest month. Annual average rainfall in the district is 1492 mm, 90% of which falls during the period from June to October. The average annual rainfall has fluctuated greatly over the last six years.

Within the district, the Kanker and Charama blocks have a predominantly dry climate, whereas that of Bhanupratappur is of the wet type.

=== Soil ===
The soil in Kanker originates from granite, gneiss, sand and khedar. Most of the area is covered with red soil. The soil is faintly coloured in the higher regions of the hilly tract, while in the river valleys, the soil is smooth and fertile. The soils of this district can be divided into four types.

A. Kanhar: This type of soil is black and oily. The capacity of water absorption by this soil is great, and this is very useful in growth of Kharif and Rabi crops in the region. This type of soil is found in the planes of Kotri and Mahanadi.

B. Dorsa: This type of soil is medium in nature and it is very similar to Matasi and Kanhar type soil. This type of soil is found in north east Kanker and in the Bhanupratappur region.

C. Matasi: This type of soil is found at an elevation higher than Kanhar and less than Bhata. This soil is appropriate for growing rice. This type of soil is found in most of the Kanker region.

D. Bhata: This soil-type is affected by a late rating process. It can be red or yellow, having a mixed shape/condition. This soil is found in uplands of the area. It is appropriate for the cultivation of crops like Kodo, Kulthi, Maize and Kutki.

== Administrative divisions ==
There are 7 blocks and 11 tehsils in Kanker district. They are:

Block	Tehsil	Important places
Kanker	Kanker	Kanker, Makdi
Charama	Charama	Charama, Lakhanpuri
Narharpur	Narharpur	Narharpur
Narharpur	Sarona	Sarona
Bhanupratappur	Bhanupratappur	Bhanupratappur, Sambalpur, Korar, Kachche
Durgukondal	Durgukondal	Durgukondal, Kodekurse
Antagarh	Antagarh	Antagarh
Antagarh	Amabeda	Amabeda
Koyalibeda	Koyalibeda	Koyalibeda
Koyalibeda	Pakhanjur	Pakhanjur, Kapsi, Badgaon
Koyalibeda	Bande	Bande

There are 454 Gram Panchayats and 1005 villages in the Kanker district.

== Economy ==
Agriculture is the mainstay of people in the district. Even though large numbers of them are tribal, it is agriculture that sustains them for most of the year. Non-timber forest produce is another major source of income, as large tracts of the land are still forested. The tribes in many places practice Marham or Dippa. The farmers who live in the forest cut the trees before the rainy season and use the land for agriculture. After every two years they prepare a new farm and leave the old one fallow for some time. On the planes, the land is farm every year. Rice is the main crop but wheat, sugar cane, Gram, Kodo, Moong, Tilli, and maize other important crops. People also grow varieties of vegetables. Varieties of fruits such as mangoes, and bananas are also produced.

About half of rural Kanker is below the poverty line, according to official estimates. The entire district is drought prone. Over 80 percent of the working population is already dependent on marginal agriculture and allied activities, with low incomes and stagnant productivity. Thus, in addition to providing a livelihood for the unemployed, it is a challenge to make the existing the livelihoods of the nearly 295,000 (2.95 lakh) workers more productive. This would be beneficial, since persons engaged in agriculture could then earn an adequate income to meet their basic needs. Thus, the only feasible option in the short to medium run is to increase employment in the main livelihood sector, which is agriculture. Diversification, intensification and stabilisation of agriculture are at the core of the challenge of livelihood promotion in the district.

== Minerals ==
Kanker is rich in minerals. Iron ore, quartzite and garnet deposits are found in southern regions of the district, but mining of these minerals on a commercial scale has not been attempted. About 100 million tons of iron ore deposits have been identified in the Hahaladdi region of the Bhanupratappur Tehsil. Chhattisgarh's second biggest iron ore deposits, Rowghat Mines, is in Antargarh tehsil in this district. Its reserves are assessed at 731 Million tons. Rowghat Mines will supply iron ore to the Bhilai Steel Plant of SAIL.

Black and white granite is plentiful in the district, where it is used as a building material. In the Markatola and in Barchhegondi region aluminium-bearing Sillimanite/Kinite deposits have been identified. Some deposits of gold have been found in Sona Dehi, Michgaon and in certain other regions of Bhanupratappur Tehsil. At present some bauxite-based (aluminium) industries are functional in the district.

== Flora ==
Most of the forest in Kanker district is of dry deciduous type. In Kanker district Sal, teak and mixed forests are found. Sal forests are found in the eastern part of the district, teak forests are found in the Bhanupratappur region and mixed forests are found in most of the area. In the mixed forest varieties of medicinal plants and other economically important plants such as Saja, Tendu, Dhaura, Bija, Harra and Mahua are found in abundance.

== Socio-cultural Aspects ==
About half of the total population is Kanker district is tribal. Accordingly, most of the culture of Kanker district is tribal, even though an interplay/fusion with other cultures is clearly visible.

=== Languages ===
The chief languages or dialects used in the Kanker district are Hindi, Bengali, Chhattisgarhi, Gondi and Halbi. There were times when Halbi was an important language; at one time all of the administrative work was done in that language. Halbi is a compound form of Hindi.

Bhatri is the main branch of Halbi language. There are a lot of words taken in this language from other languages including Sanskrit, Hindi, Arabic, and Persian. Like Hindi, Halbi also has two genders, masculine and feminine, but the feminine is used more.

The other languages such as Bengali, Telugu and Odia are also spoken in some parts of the district.

=== Religion ===
Until the end of the Nala dynasty, the people were divided into four different castes, namely: Brahmin, Kshatriya, Vaishya and Shudra. After the downfall of the Nal dynasty, many people came from outside and the main castes divided into sub-castes. There were around 62 castes in Bastar state and Kanker state.

The tribes Maria, Gond, Ojha, Muria, Bhatra are divided into sub-caste San Bhatra, Pit Bhatra, Amnit Bhatra Amnit. These castes hold highest status. Parja, Gadva, Halba, Ganda, Mahra, Chandal, Ghuruva, Dom, Lohar, Matrigond, Rajgond, Dorla, Nahar, Naikpod, Kuduk, Andkuri, Kumhar, Kosta, Chamar, Kenvat, Dhakad, were important and in other castes Brahmin, Vaishya, Kayasth, Teli, Kalar, Kshtriya, Kunbi, Dhobi, Marathi, Mohammedan, Pathan, Telanga, Orria, Rohilla and others were important. About half of the population is tribal, although in this modern era the culture has slightly changed.

=== Family structure ===
In all castes, people live as a joint family. All the families are male dominant. The oldest person is the head of the family and all other members obey his authority. The oldest person of the family has full authority on all financial matters. All sons have the same share in the family assets, however daughters have no share. In tribes, the women play an important role.

=== Marriage ===
Like all other cultured castes, the marriage ceremony is very important to the tribes of Kanker.

- Among Halbas, two types of marriages are popular, namely brief marriages and detailed marriages.
- Among Bhatras, four types of marriages are popular namely arranged marriage, love marriages, widow marriages and dhariya marriage.
- Among Murias, arrange marriage, love marriage and kidnapping marriages are popular.
- Among all types of Gonds, arranged marriages, love marriages and kidnapping marriages are popular.

Among the tribes, if any woman chooses a new husband, then the new husband gives money to the old husband as 'compensation allowance'. This compensation is settled by the leader of caste. Remarriage of widows is also popular among tribes. In Halbas no widow may be married with any unmarried person. In some tribes, there is a tradition named Ghotul. Ghotul is a cultural centre of Gonds and Murias.

=== Customs at death ===
The tribal customs of death are complex.

The Maria bury dead bodies. If a woman dies during her pregnancy, her body is buried. If a child who is younger than 5 years dies, then their body is also buried beneath a Mahua tree and their head is placed facing an easterly direction. They construct a little tomb in that place in memory of the dead person.

The Gonds place the legs facing the south, in tombs. In some tribes they place a wooden pole in memory of the dead person.

=== Madai and other Festivals ===
Among the tribes of Kanker and Bastar districts there is an important festival celebrated called Madai. This festival is a moving festival and moves throughout the Kanker, Bastar and Dantewada regions from December to March. The celebration of the festival starts in Bastar Region in December. On Poornima people celebrate the Madai festival in respect of the goddess Kesharpal Kesharpalin Devi.

In January, the people of Kanker, and the adjoining areas of Charama and Kurna, celebrate the Madai festival. In the month of February, the festival is celebrated in Bastar district and there the festival is celebrated in the respect of Cheri-Chher-Kin. At the end of February, the Madai festival goes to Antagarh, Narayanpur and Bhanupratappur, and in March it is celebrated in Kondagaon, Keshkal and Bhopalpattanam.

The festival is celebrated in the respect of local Gods and Goddess. This festival is celebrated in a big ground where thousands of peoples gather simultaneously. The festival starts with a procession of local God or Goddess; after that the worship is done and then the festival starts. A lot of shops, restaurants, crafts, dances and other cultural program can be seen in this festival.

Although the festival is tribal, all the communities have faith, celebrate and enjoy the festival. Other important festivals are Mati-tihar, Gobar-boharani, Rama Navami and Navakhani.

The standard Hindu festivals of Dusshera, Diwali, and Holi are celebrated also, as in other parts of India.

=== Handicrafts ===
The tribal societies of Kanker are known for their handicrafts prepared with a variety of designs and shapes. These handicrafts include wood-carvings, bell-metal items, terracotta items, and bamboo items, among others. Kanker is a forestry district containing good quality woods from which wooden-carving crafts and various types of furniture are made by skilled artisans. These items attract locals as well as outsiders.

=== Wood and bamboo crafts ===
This is one of the most distinctive arts of tribal wooden carving. These wooden crafts are made out of the finest teak wood and white wood. These wooden crafts include models, idols, wall panels and furniture items. These handicrafts are generally exported to different parts of India, and there is also demand from foreign countries. The tribes make bamboo crafts also. Bamboo crafts include wall hangings, table lamps, and table mats among other items.

== Noteworthy locations ==
Kanker District has the following attractions:

=== Kanker Palace ===
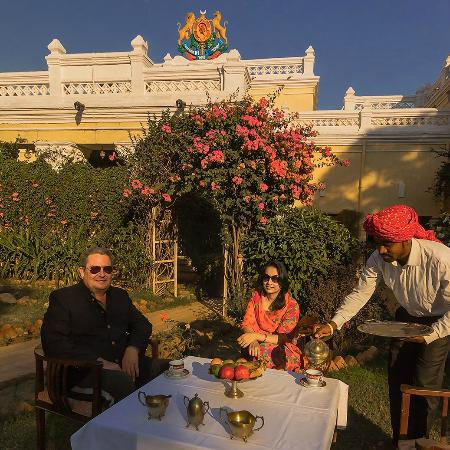

This place is very renowned for its royal palace including the tribal villages and the deep forests. The palace was owned by the esteemed 12th century royal family. The family of the late Maharajadhiraj Udai Pratap Deo resided here, since 2002. Now some section of the palace are being converted into a hotel.

=== Gadiya Mountain ===
The Gadiya Mountain came into light at the time of Kandra dynasty. When the Kandra king Dharma Dev won the Kanker, he declared his capital on Gadhiya Mountain, which is a natural form of a fort. On the mountain there is a natural reservoir which never dries and which is filled by water throughout the year. One part of this reservoirs is called 'Sonai' and the other part is called 'Rupai'. Sonai and Rupai were the two daughters of the Kandra king Dharma Dev. On the southern part of this reservoir there is a cave named 'Churi pagar'. The entrance to this cave is very narrow. During any attack the King and his family lived safely in this cave.

The space of the cave is sufficient to accommodate 500 people inside. The exit door of this cave is towards west direction. In the south east part of Gadiya mountain there is another cave called Jogi cave. The length of this cave is 50 meters. In ancient times, it is said that many monks lived and meditated here. There is a small pond in this cave. The water of this cave flows on the rock like a waterfall. The Doodh river flows at the bottom of Gadiya mountain, .

Legend Years ago, it is said, a King lived in the Gadhiya Mountain. He had two daughters named "Sonai" and "Rupai". Both were playing near the lake over the hilly area. Suddenly they both fell in the lake; that lake was later named "Sonai Rupai Talab". It is said that the water of that lake never dries and there are two fish on very bottom of that Lake. One fish is of gold and another one is of silver. According to the legend, both fish are remain alive even to this day. Many people in Kanker claim that they have seen both fish. On the mountain there are two rocks behind the main "Sheetla Temple" and the door between those mountain is very thin. Only slim persons can enter there, but after entering the middle there is a Big Hall in which about 300 people can be seated. People say that the King used to stay with his soldiers during any war on that particular place.

On the occasion of Navratri, a cultural fest known as Gadhiya Mahotsav is celebrated beneath the Gadhiya Mountain.

=== Malajkudum Waterfall ===
About 15 kilometres away towards south form Kanker, there is a mountain. On this mountain there is a spot named Neele Gondi from where the Doodh river takes its shape. After crossing the 10 kilometres there is a place named as Malajkudum from where the river produces three waterfalls. This waterfall will make to fell love with the nature. The heights of these waterfalls are 10 meters. 15 meters and 9 meters respectively. The slope of this water fall is like a ladder. The wave of this waterfall is attractive and challenging. This is an ideal place for picnic. The road is available to reach this spot.

=== Charre-Marre Waterfall Antagarh ===
This is another waterfall situated in Kanker district. This waterfall is situated 17 kilometers away from Antagarh block of Kanker district. There is a place named Charre-Marre on the way from Antagarh to Aamabera. The waterfall produces by the river named Jogidahara which flows in Matla valley. The height of this waterfall is 16 meters. The slope of this water fall is jig jag.

=== Shivani Temple ===
This temple is situated in Kanker city. This temple is called Shivani Maa temple. The statue of goddess is excellent. According to a myth this Goddess is a combination of two Goddess name Kali Maa and Durga Maa. The vertically half part is of goddess Kali and the remaining half part is of goddess Durga. There are only two of this type of statue in the world (the other one is in Kolkata).

=== Notable temples ===
- Kalibadi Temple - Near Komal Deo Club (Riyasatkalin Old Durga Puja Place) Manjhapara
- Santoshi Temple - Near New Bus Stand
- Maa Shitla Devi Temple - Shitlapara
- Jagannath Temple - Rajapara
- Shiv Temple - Up Down Road
- Hanuman Temple - Up Down Road
- Krishna Temple - Near Daily Market
- Balaji Temple - Rajapara
- Tripur Sundari Temple - Nathiya Nava Gaon
- Shanidev Temple- Near Daily market
- Kankaleen Temple- Near M.G. Ward
- Sai Temple- Near Shitlapara
- Maa Singhwahini Temple - Rajapara
- Old Hanuman (prachin) Temple -Rajapara
- Jain Mandir- Rajapara

=== Other places of attraction ===
- Tank on mountain
- Keshkal Ghat
- Ishan van
- Bhandari Para Dam
- Up Down Road
- Paralkot Reservoir
- Mankesri Dam
- Dudhawa Dam

== Plans under BRGF ==
Centre for Rural Management (CRM), Kottayam, Kerala has been assigned to prepare a five-year Perspective Plan and Annual Plans under BRGF in the District of Kanker. The annual plan for 2012-2013 has been approved by the District Planning Committee District planning committees in India on 10 March 2012 and it is started uploading in the plan plus. The Preparation of the perspective plan is under progress. CRM has constituted a team under the leadership of Dr. Jos Chathukulam, the Director. Bastar Dharma Kshema Samiti, Jagadalpur provides local support for the plan preparation under the leadership of Rev. Fr. Abraham Kochukarackal CMI.
