= Sirpur =

Sirpur may refer to the following communities:

== Chhattisgarh, India ==
- Sirpur, Durg, a village in Dondiluhara tehsil, Durg district
- Sirpur, Kanker, a village in Pakhanjore tehsil, Kanker district
- Sirpur, Kondagaon, a village in Kondagaon tehsil, Bastar district
- Sirpur, Narayanpur, a village in Narayanpur tehsil, Bastar district
- Sirpur, Mahasamund, a village in Mahasamund tehsil, Mahasamund district (referred to in archaeological inscriptions and texts as Sripur or Sripura)
  - Sirpur Group of Monuments, an archaeological site around Mahanadi river in Chhattisgarh, India
- Sirpur, Saraipali, a village in Saraipali tehsil, Mahasamund district

== Telangana, India ==
- Sirpur (T), a town in Sirpur (T) mandal, Komaram Bheem district
- Sirpur (U), a village in Sirpur (U) mandal, Komaram Bheem district

== See also ==
- Sripur (disambiguation)
- Sirpur Dam, a dam on Bagh river in Chhattisgarh and Maharashtra, India
- Sirpur Paper Mills, a paper mill in Telangana, India
