= Sripur =

Sripur may refer to:

- Manidvipa or Sripur, celestial abode of Mahadevi, the supreme goddess, in Hinduism
- Srīpur (crater), impact crater on Mars
- Sripur Area, operational area in Eastern Coalfields Limited in West Bengal, India
- Sripur, Jaynagar, village in West Bengal, India
- Sripur, Hooghly, census town, West Bengal, India
  - Sripur Halt railway station
- Sripur, Mahottari, Nepal
- Sripur, Seti, Nepal
- Sripur, Sylhet Division, Bangladesh

== See also ==
- Shreepur (disambiguation)
- Tiruppur (disambiguation)
- Sirpur (disambiguation)
