= Koga (crater) =

Crater on Mars

- Crater Koga based on THEMIS day-time image
- Planet: Mars
- Coordinates: 29.3°S 103.8°W
- Quadrangle: Phoenicis Lacus
- Diameter: 19 km
- Eponym: Koga, Tanzania

Koga is an impact crater on Mars, approximately 19 kilometers in diameter. It is located at 29.3°S, 103.8°W, north of the crater Virrat and northeast of the crater Dinorwic. To the north is the crater Nhill. It is named after a town in Tanzania, and its name was approved by the International Astronomical Union in 1991. According to a surface age map of Mars based on US Geological Survey data, the area around Koga is from the Noachian epoch, which places the area's age at 3.8 to 3.5 billion years ago. Sharp blocks and cliffs poke through a mantle of fine material located at the bottom of the crater. At the deepest part of the crater, it is about 5,200 meters in elevation above zero altitude, and its rim averages about 6,400 meters above zero altitude. It is therefore approximately 1.2 kilometers deep.
