= Dinorwic =

Dinorwic, is the anglicised form of the Welsh name Dinorwig, a village in Wales.

It may also refer to:

- Dinorwic (crater), a crater on Mars, named after the Canadian settlement
- Dinorwic, Ontario, a community in Canada
- Dinorwic quarry, a former slate quarry near Dinorwig, Wales
