= Srīpur (crater) =

Impact crater on Mars

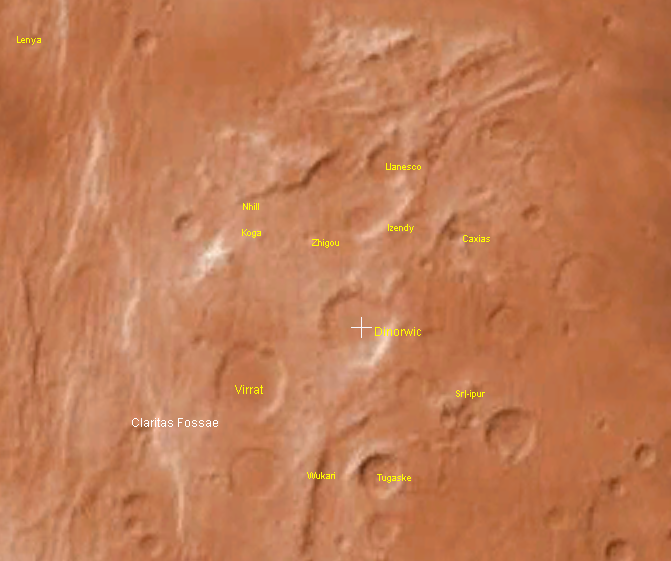
- The crater Srīpur and its surroundings, in a screenshot in NASA World Wind.
- Planet: Mars
- Coordinates: 31.1°S 100.8°W
- Quadrangle: Thaumasia
- Diameter: 22.99 km (14.29 mi)
- Eponym: Srīpur, a town in Bangladesh

Srīpur is a Martian impact crater, approximately 22.99 kilometres (14.29 mi) in diameter. It is located at -31.1°S, 100.8°W, southeast of the crater Dinorwic and northeast of the crater Tugaske. It is named for Sripur, a town in Bangladesh, and its name was adopted by the International Astronomical Union in 1991.

According to a surface age map of Mars based on US Geological Survey data, the area around Srīpur is from the Noachian epoch, which places the area's age at 3.8 to 3.5 billion years ago. The crater floor is relatively flat, except for a small craterlet toward east of the center, and is approximately 6,300 metres (20,700 ft) above zero altitude in elevation. Its rim averages about 6,800 metres (22,300 ft) above zero altitude, making it 500 metres (1,600 ft) deep. The area south of the crater is about the same elevation as the crater floor.
