= Tugaske =

Tugaske may refer to:

- Tugaske, Saskatchewan
- Tugaske (crater), a crater on Mars named after the town
