= Mars Student Imaging Project =

American education program

The Mars Student Imaging Project (MSIP, sometimes called Mars Student Imaging Program) is a collaboration between NASA and Arizona State University's Mars Education Program that gives United States grade school students the opportunity to participate in Mars research. Students from grade five through college sophomore level work with THEMIS scientists at ASU's Mars Space Flight Facility to take images of sites on Mars using the visible wavelength camera on the Mars Odyssey spacecraft.

After students frame a research question, they help direct the Mars Odyssey to take images that will answer their question. In June, 2010, seventh grade science students at Evergreen Middle School in Cottonwood, California helped researchers discover a new series of lava tubes, including one with a pit crater. The students were looking for the most common sites for lava tubes on Mars, asking whether they are more prevalent near the volcano's summit, its flanks, or in the plains surrounding the volcano. The pit crater they discovered is in the form of a skylight above a lava tube, on the slope of the Pavonis Mons volcano.

The pit crater is only the second one discovered on Pavonis Mons, and is estimated to be approximately 190 metres (620 ft) wide and 115 metres (377 ft) deep.
