= Sreepur Upazila =

Sreepur Upazila may refer to:

- Sreepur Upazila, Gazipur, Bangladesh
- Sreepur Upazila, Magura, Bangladesh

== See also ==
- Sreepur (disambiguation)
