= Shreepur =

Shreepur may refer to:

- Manidvipa or Sripur, celestial abode of Mahadevi, the supreme goddess, in Hinduism
- Shreepur, Mahottari, in the Janakpur Zone of south-eastern Nepal
- Shreepur, Sarlahi, in the Janakpur Zone of south-eastern Nepal
- Shreepur, Maharashtra in Malshiras Taluka in India

== See also ==
- Sripur (disambiguation)
