= Mars Space Flight Facility =

Arizona State University research center

Coordinates: 33.4179902°N 111.9360869°W

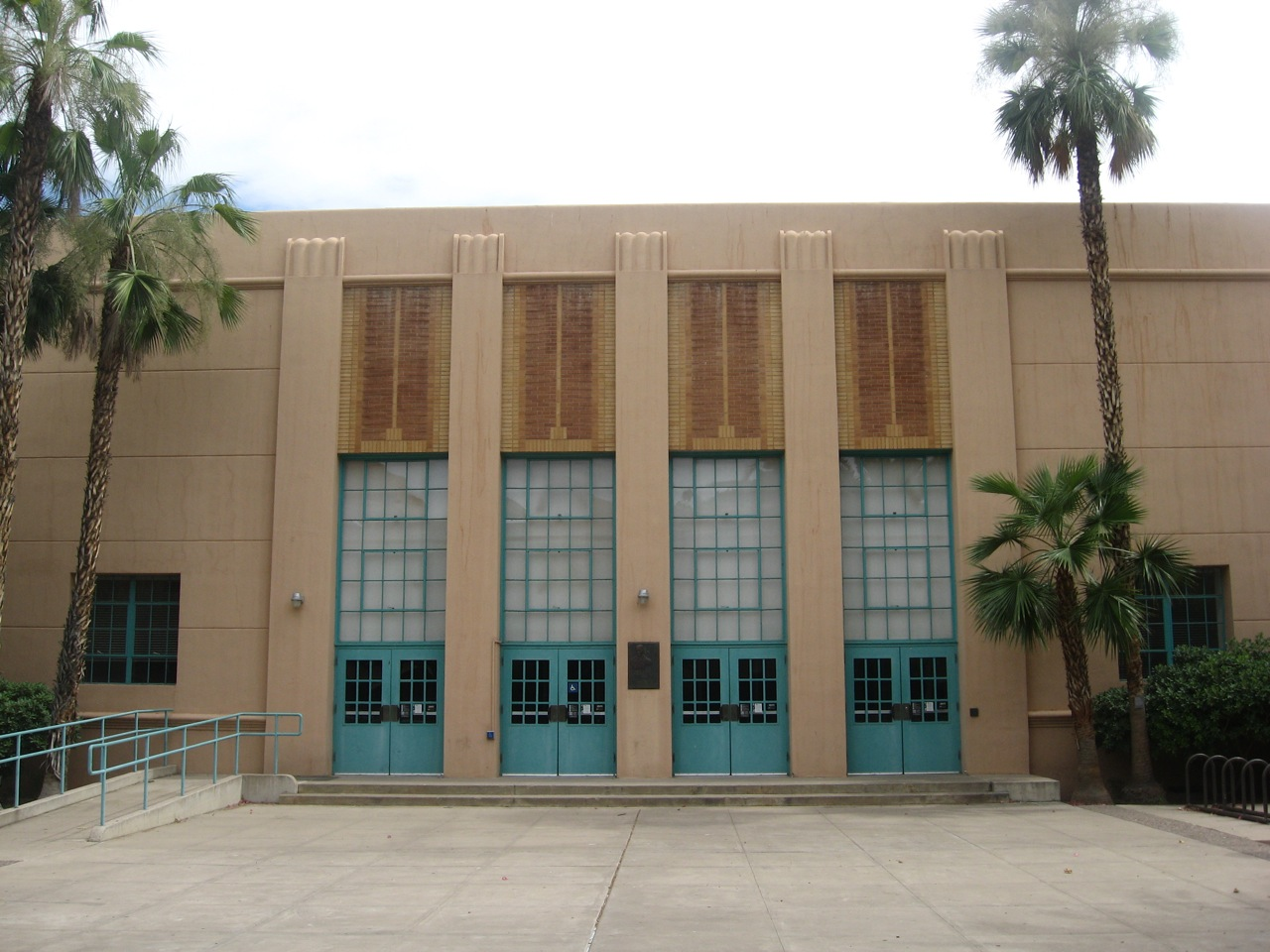
The Mars Space Flight Facility

The Mars Space Flight Facility is located at Arizona State University in Tempe, Arizona.

The facility is a research center in Arizona State University's School for Earth and Space Exploration. Scientists, researchers, and students there specialize in using instruments on spacecraft at Mars for remote sensing research primarily concerning the geology and mineralogy of the planet.

The instruments based at the facility include the Thermal Emission Imaging System (THEMIS) on NASA's Mars Odyssey orbiter and two Miniature Thermal Emission Spectrometers (Mini-TES) on the Mars Exploration Rovers, Spirit and Opportunity. (A full-size Mars rover model, bedded on reddish-brown sand, dominates the building's lobby.) Before the loss of NASA's Mars Global Surveyor in November 2006, the facility also operated the Thermal Emission Spectrometer (TES) aboard the spacecraft.

On May 25, 2011, NASA announced a New Frontiers Mission, OSIRIS-REx, to a carbonaceous asteroid. The mission will include OTES, an updated and modified version of the Mini-TES Spectrometer from the MER missions.

The facility's director is Dr. Phil Christensen; he is the principal investigator of the THEMIS instrument, a co-investigator on the Mars Exploration Rover project, and the principal investigator of the Mini-TES instrument on board the rovers. He was also the principal investigator for Thermal Emission Spectrometer (TES).

In addition, the facility houses the Mars Education Program, which provides workshops, field trips, and other opportunities for teachers and students to join with scientists in Mars exploration.
