= Tiruppur (disambiguation) =

Tiruppur is a city of Tamil Nadu, India.

Tiruppur may also refer to:

- Tiruppur (State Assembly Constituency), a legislative assembly that includes the city Tiruppur
- Tiruppur district, a district of the Indian state Tamil Nadu
  - Tiruppur taluk, a taluk of Tiruppur district of the Indian state of Tamil Nadu
- Tiruppur (film), a 2010 Indian Tamil-language film
- Tiruppur Kumaran (1904–1932), an Indian revolutionary who participated in the Indian independence movement

== See also ==
- Sripur (disambiguation)
