= Mars Radiation Environment Experiment =

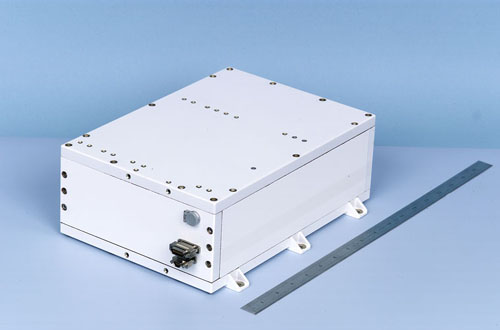
MARIE hardware

The Mars Radiation Environment Experiment (MARIE) was designed to measure the radiation environment of Mars using an energetic particle spectrometer as part of the science mission of the 2001 Mars Odyssey spacecraft (launched on April 7, 2001). It was led by NASA's Johnson Space Center and the science investigation was designed to characterize aspects of the radiation environment both on the way to Mars and while it was in the Martian orbit.

Since space radiation presents an extreme hazard to crews of interplanetary missions the experiment was an attempt to predict anticipated radiation doses that would be experienced by future astronauts and it helped determine possible effects of Martian radiation on human beings.

Space radiation comes from cosmic rays emitted by Earth's local star, the Sun, and from stars beyond the Solar System as well. Space radiation can trigger cancer and cause damage to the central nervous system. Similar instruments are flown on the Space Shuttles and on the International Space Station (ISS), but none have ever flown outside Earth's protective magnetosphere, which blocks much of this radiation from reaching the surface of our planet.

MARIE was turned off on 28 October 2003 after communication was lost during a large solar proton event.

== Operation ==
A spectrometer inside the instrument measured the energy from two sources of space radiation: galactic cosmic rays (GCR) and solar energetic particles (SEP). As the spacecraft orbited the red planet, the spectrometer swept through the sky and measured the radiation field.

The instrument, with a 68-degree field of view, was designed to collect data continuously during Mars Odyssey's cruise from Earth to Mars. It stored large amounts of data for downlink, and operated throughout the entire science mission.

== MARIE specifications ==
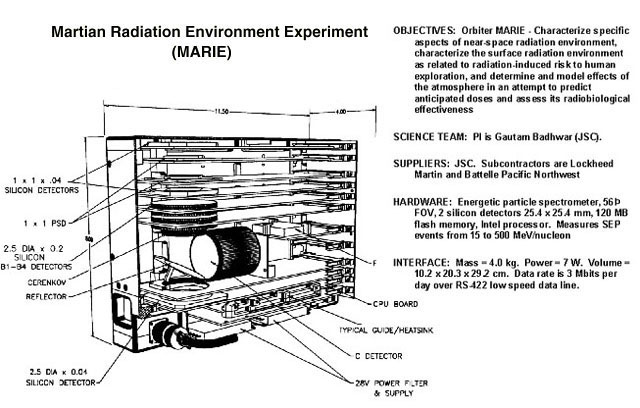
MARIE

The Martian Radiation Environment Experiment weighs 3.3 kilograms (7.3 pounds) and uses 7 watts of power. It measures 29.4 x 23.2 x 10.8 centimeters (11.6 x 9.1 x 4.3 inches).

== Results ==
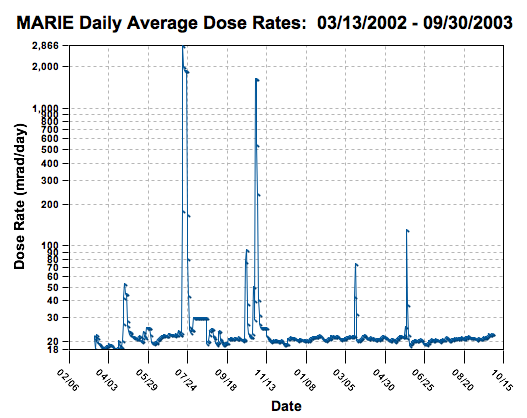

The diagram above indicates that a main radiation exposure is about 20 mrad/d resulting in annual dose of about 73 mGy/a. However occasional solar proton events (SPEs) produce a hundred and more times higher doses (see the diagram above). SPEs, which were observed by MARIE, were not observed by sensors near Earth confirming that SPEs are directional. Thus the average in-orbit doses were about 400–500mSv/a.

JPL reported that MARIE-measured radiation levels were two to three times greater than that at the International Space Station (which is 100–200 mSv/a). The levels at the Martian surface might be closer to the level at the ISS due to atmospheric shielding – ignoring the effect of thermal neutrons induced by GCR.
