= Sreepur (disambiguation) =

Sreepur is a city in Bangladesh. Sreepur also may refer to:

== Bangladesh ==
- Sreepur Upazila, Gazipur
- Sreepur Upazila, Magura

== Nepal ==
- Sreepur, Mahakali

== See also ==
- Sripur (disambiguation)
