= Sirpur, Narayanpur =

Sirpur
- village
- Country: India
- State: Chhattisgarh
- District: Bastar
- Tehsil: Narayanpur

Government
  - Body: Village panchayat

Population (2001)
  - Total: 235
- Time zone: UTC+5:30 (IST)
- Vehicle registration: CG

Sirpur is a village in Narayanpur district, Chhattisgarh, India.

== Demographics ==
In the 2001 India census, the village of Sirpur had a population of 235, with 111 males (47.2%) and 124 females (52.8%), for a gender ratio of 1117 females per thousand males.
