= Thermal Emission Imaging System =

Camera aboard NASA's 2001 Mars Odyssey orbiter

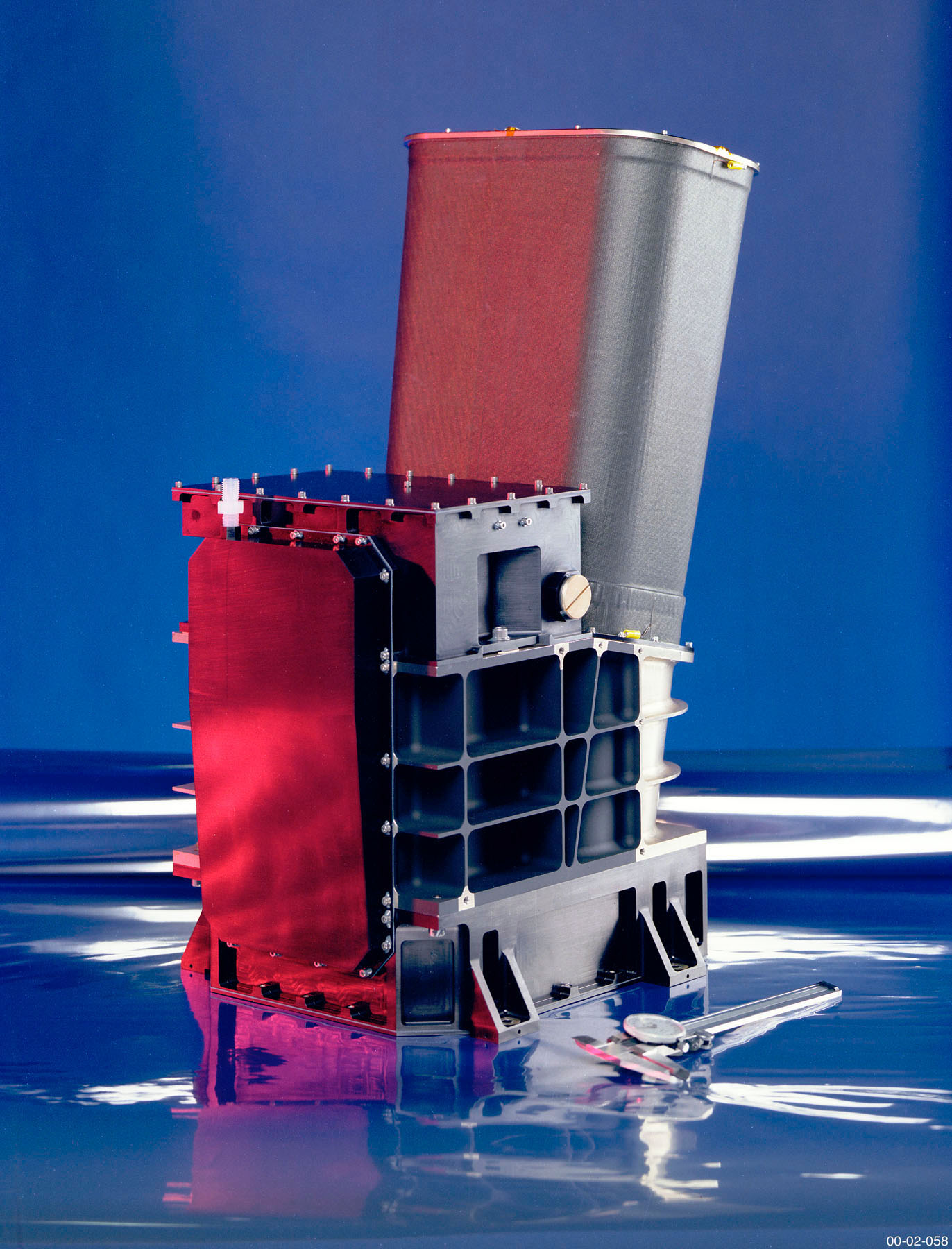
The THEMIS instrument, before being mounted onto Mars Odyssey.

The Thermal Emission Imaging System (THEMIS) is a camera on board the 2001 Mars Odyssey orbiter. It images Mars in the visible and infrared parts of the electromagnetic spectrum in order to determine the thermal properties of the surface and to refine the distribution of minerals on the surface of Mars as determined by the Thermal Emission Spectrometer (TES). Additionally, it helps scientists to understand how the mineralogy of Mars relates to its landforms, and it can be used to search for thermal hotspots in the Martian subsurface.

THEMIS is managed from the Mars Space Flight Facility at Arizona State University and was built by the Santa Barbara Remote Sensing division of Raytheon Technologies Corporation, an American multinational conglomerate headquartered in Waltham, Massachusetts. The instrument is named after Themis, the goddess of justice in ancient Greek mythology.

== Infrared camera ==
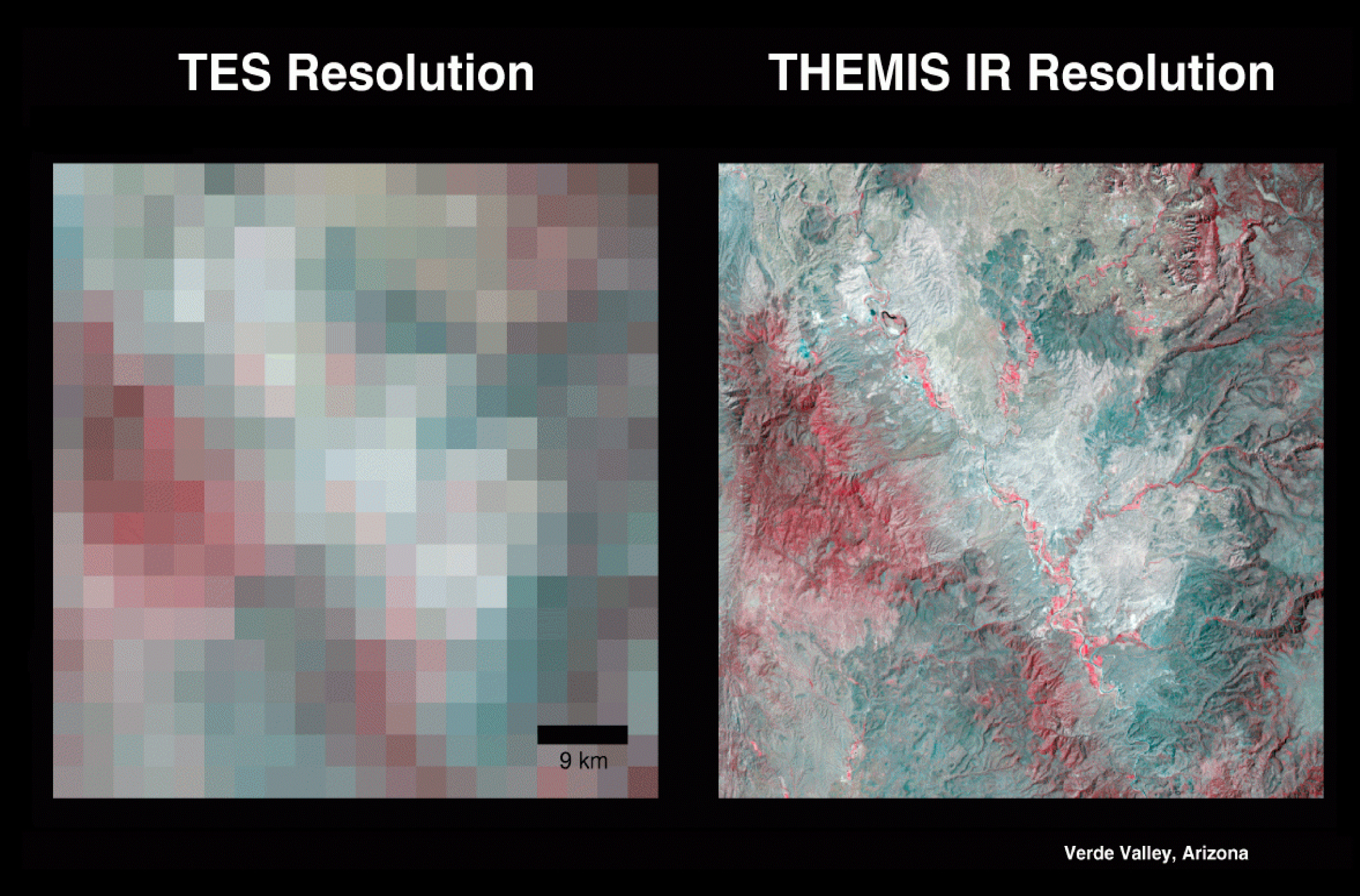
Spatial resolution comparison between MGS's TES instrument and Odyssey's THEMIS instrument. (The spectral resolutions are inversely related.)

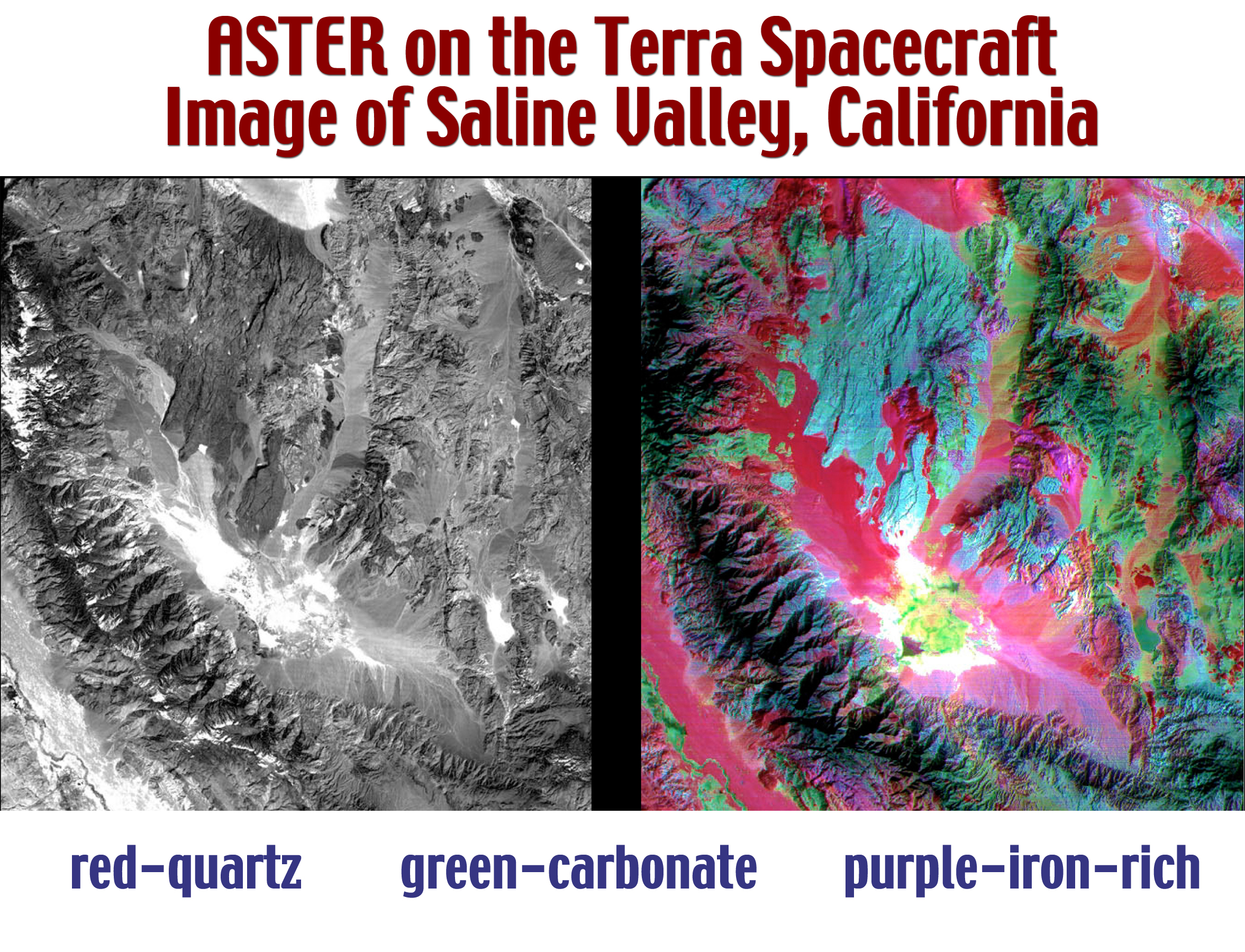
Sample map from Terra's ASTER instrument: Saline Valley, California

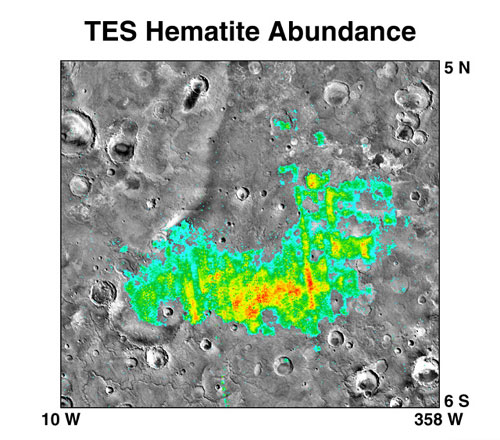
Map showing distribution of hematite in Sinus Meridiani. This data was used to target the landing of the Opportunity rover. Hematite is usually formed in the presence of water. Opportunity landed in this area and did find much evidence for water.

THEMIS detects thermal infrared energy emitted by the Martian surface at nine different wavelengths. Eight of these have wavelengths between 6 and 13 micrometers, an ideal region of the infrared spectrum to determine thermal energy patterns characteristic of silicate minerals. The ninth band is at 14.9 micrometers and is used to monitor the Martian atmosphere. The shortest infrared wavelength, at 6.78 micrometers, is measured twice in two bands to improve the signal-to-noise ratio. THEMIS is therefore a 10-band instrument that detects nine different wavelengths .

The absorption spectrum measured by THEMIS contains two kinds of information: temperature and emissivity. The temperature contribution to the measurement dominates the spectrum unless the data is corrected. In effect, a THEMIS infrared image taken during the day will look much like a shaded relief map, with slopes facing the sun being bright (hot) and shaded areas being dark (cold). In a THEMIS image taken at night, however, thermophysical properties of the surface can be inferred, such as temperature differences due to the materials' grain size (thermal inertia).

The effect of temperature can be removed from THEMIS infrared data by dividing the image by a black body curve. The resulting energy pattern is an emissivity spectrum characteristic of the specific minerals (or other things) found on the surface. The presence of minerals such as carbonates, silicates, hydroxides, sulfates, amorphous silica, oxides, and phosphates can be determined from THEMIS measurements.

In particular, this multi-spectral method allows researchers to detect the presence of minerals that form in water and to understand those minerals in their geological context.

The THEMIS infrared camera was designed to be used in conjunction with data from the Thermal Emission Spectrometer (TES), a similar instrument on Mars Global Surveyor. While THEMIS has a very high spatial resolution (100 m) with a low spectral resolution of only 10 bands between 6 and 15 micrometers, TES has a low spatial resolution (3×6 km) with very high spectral resolution of 143 bands between 5 and 50 micrometers.

The instrument's approach provides data on localized deposits associated with volcanoes, hydrothermal processes, and the alteration of minerals by surface and/or subsurface water.

The Advanced Spaceborne Thermal Emission and Reflection Radiometer (ASTER), an Earth orbiting instrument on the Terra spacecraft, has used a similar approach to map the distribution of minerals on Earth. Variations in the thermal infrared false-color image are due to differences in the minerals that make up rocks and soil.

== Discovery of a variety of rocks ==
THEMIS found a wide range of igneous rocks and minerals. Some of the rocks were low-silica basalts, high silica dacite, olivine basalts, ultramafic (picritic) basalts, and quartz-bearing granitoid rocks. The olivine basalts were present in a variety of locations, such as on crater floors and in some canyon wall layers. The mineral olivine is important because it is common in more primitive magmas from the mantle and it weathers quickly when moisture is present. So, if olivine is present, the climate must have been dry since the time that olivine was exposed. Quartz-bearing rocks were found in the central uplifts in craters. Rocks in the central uplifts were probably once buried several kilometers beneath the surface, but raised by the impact process. Rocks of dacite composition show that, within magma chambers, fractional crystallization occurred. In this process, some minerals form crystals, then settle to the bottom of the chamber. Having a variety of rocks increases the chances that some useful/valuable minerals may be found on Mars.

== Visible camera ==
THEMIS has a visible imaging camera that acquires data in five spectral bands, takes images with a spatial resolution of 18 m (59'), and can resolve objects about the size of a semi-trailer. This resolution is intermediate between large-scale images from the Viking Orbiters (150 to 300 meters per pixel) and the high-resolution images from the Mars Orbiter Camera (MOC) on board Mars Global Surveyor (1.5 to 3 meters per pixel). Visible images from THEMIS are usually close to 20 km wide (12 miles).

The THEMIS visible camera's stated purpose is to determine the geological record of past liquid and volcanic environments on Mars. Additionally, this dataset can be used in conjunction with the infrared data to identify potential landing sites for future Mars missions.

Mars - horizon views (video; 1:24; Odyssey orbiter; THEMIS camera; 9 May 2023)

== Images from the Oxia Palus quadrangle ==
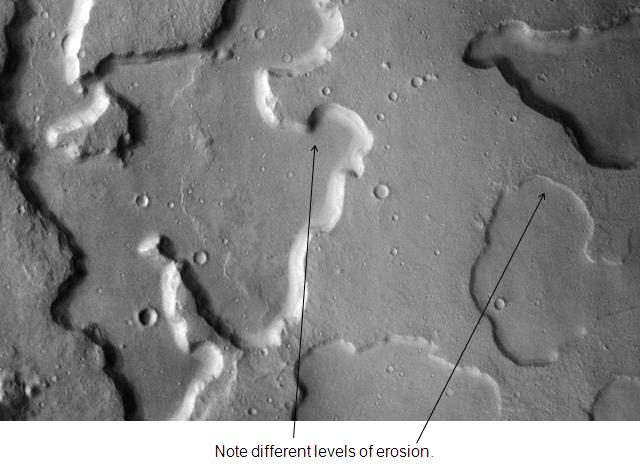
Erosion has created huge pits with steep walls. Picture from Mars Odyssey THEMIS.

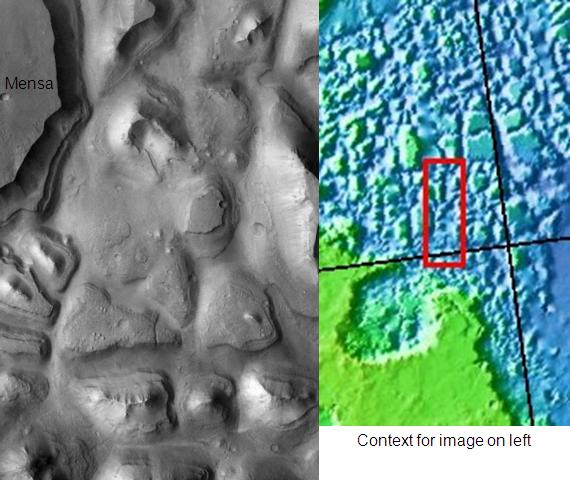
Eos Chasma with a Mensa, a flat topped prominence with cliff-like edges, as seen by THEMIS. In many places rock layers are visible.

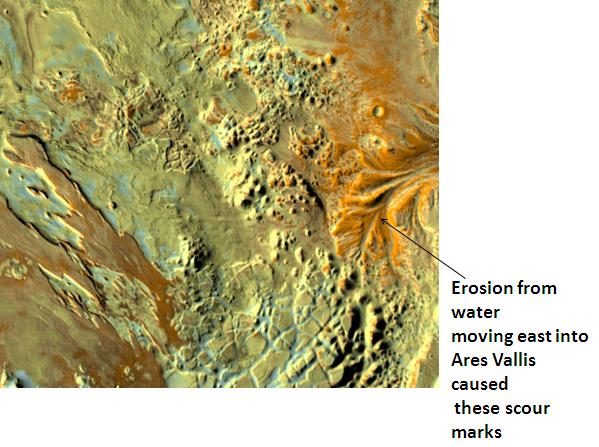
Erosion in Aram Chaos, as seen by THEMIS.

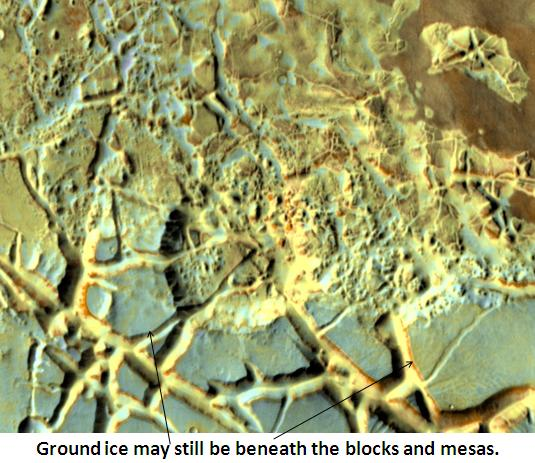
Blocks in Aram showing possible source of water, as seen by THEMIS.

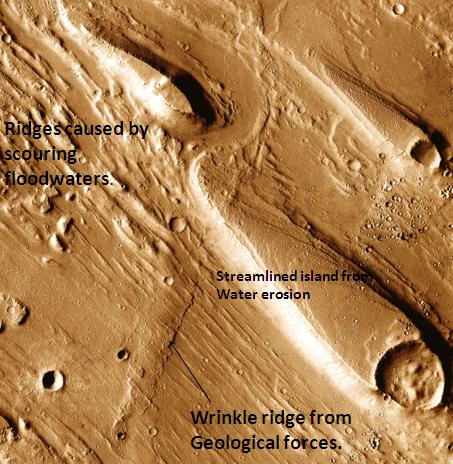
Erosion features in Ares Vallis, as seen by THEMIS

== Images from Coprates quadrangle ==
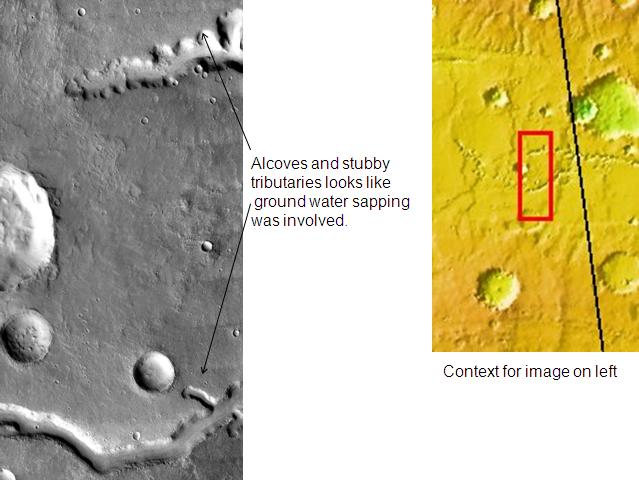
Nirgal Vallis that runs in two quadrangles has features looking like those caused by sapping. Picture taken with THEMIS.

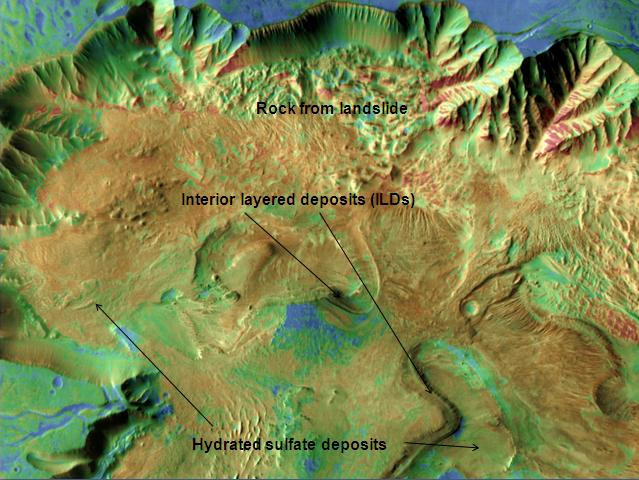
False color image of Candor Chasma showing locations of hydrated sulfate deposits, as seen by THEMIS. Red colors show rocky places. Greens and blues show sandy, dusty areas.

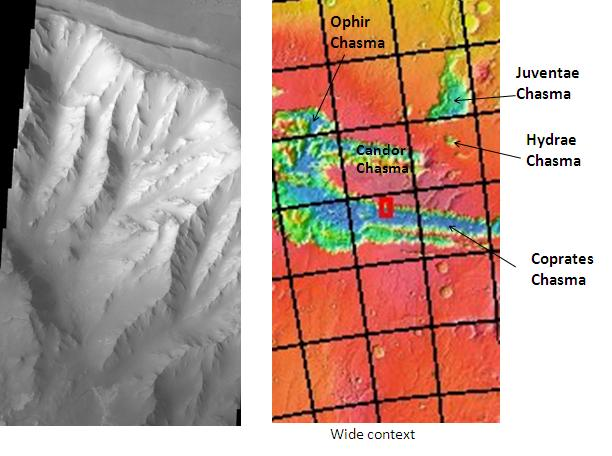
Melas Chasma, as seen by THEMIS. Click on image to see relationship of Melas to other features.

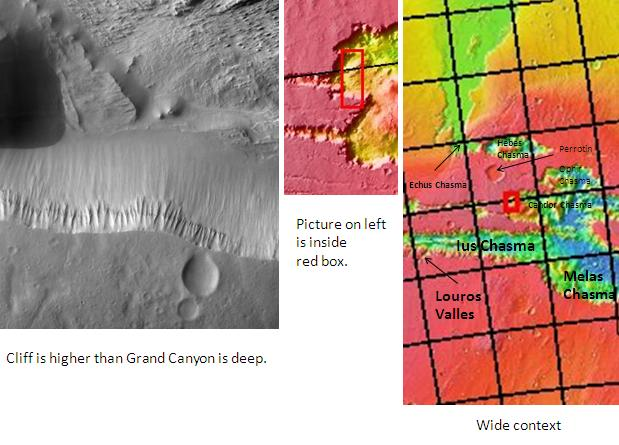
Cliff in Candor Chasma Plateau, as seen by THEMIS. Click on image to see relationship with other features in Coprates quadrangle.

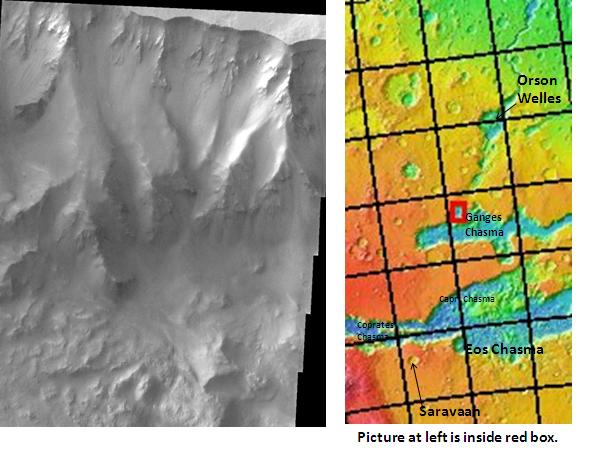
Cliff in northern wall of Ganges Chasma, as seen by THEMIS. Click on image to see relationship with other features in the Coprates quadrangle.

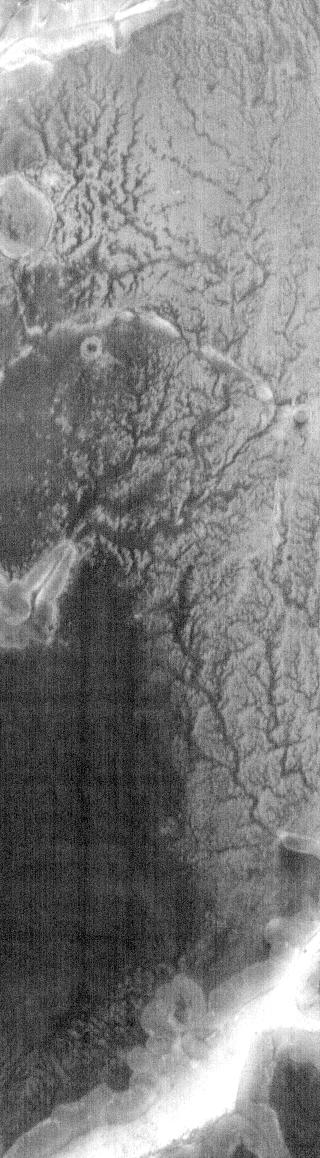
Channels West of Echus Chasma. The fine pattern of branching stream beds were probably formed from water moving across the surface.

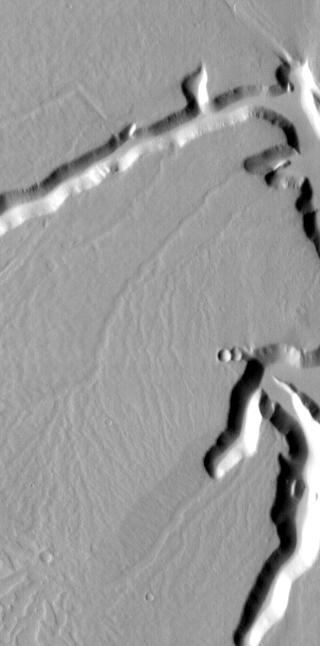
Dendritic channels on mesa of Echus Chasma. Image is 20 miles wide. Image is in Coprates quadrangle.

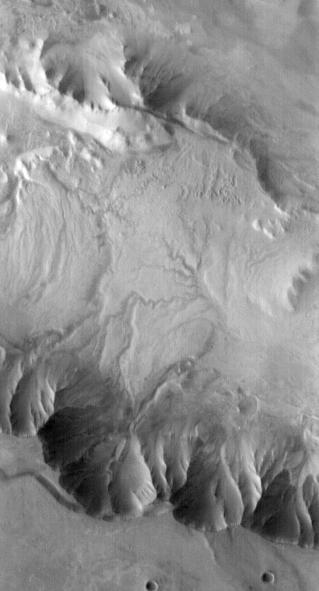
Branching channels on floor of Melas Chasma. Image is in Coprates quadrangle.

== Images from Lunae Palus quadrangle ==
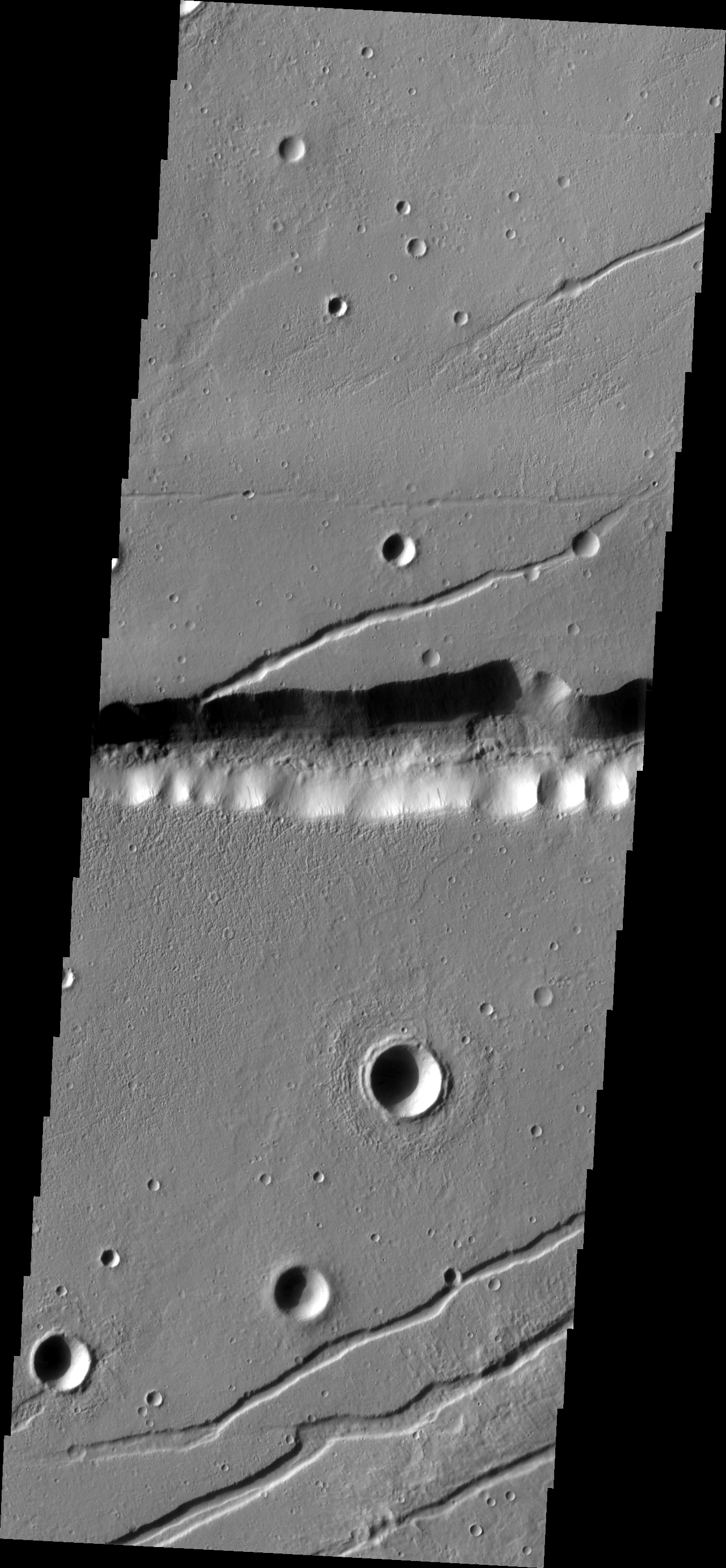
Labeatis Fossae, as seen by THEMIS.

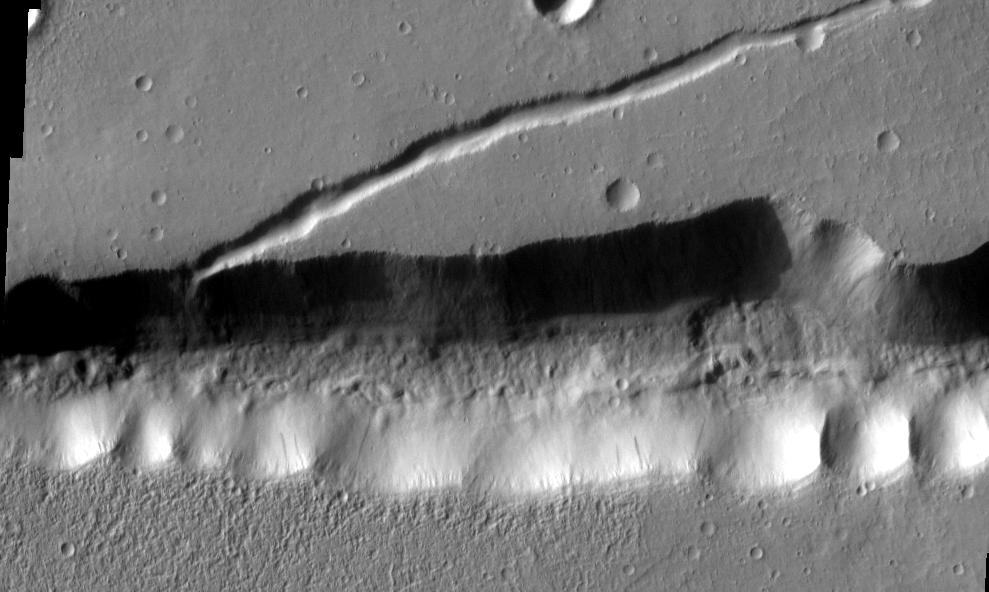
Close-up view of Labeatis Fossae, as seen by THEMIS.

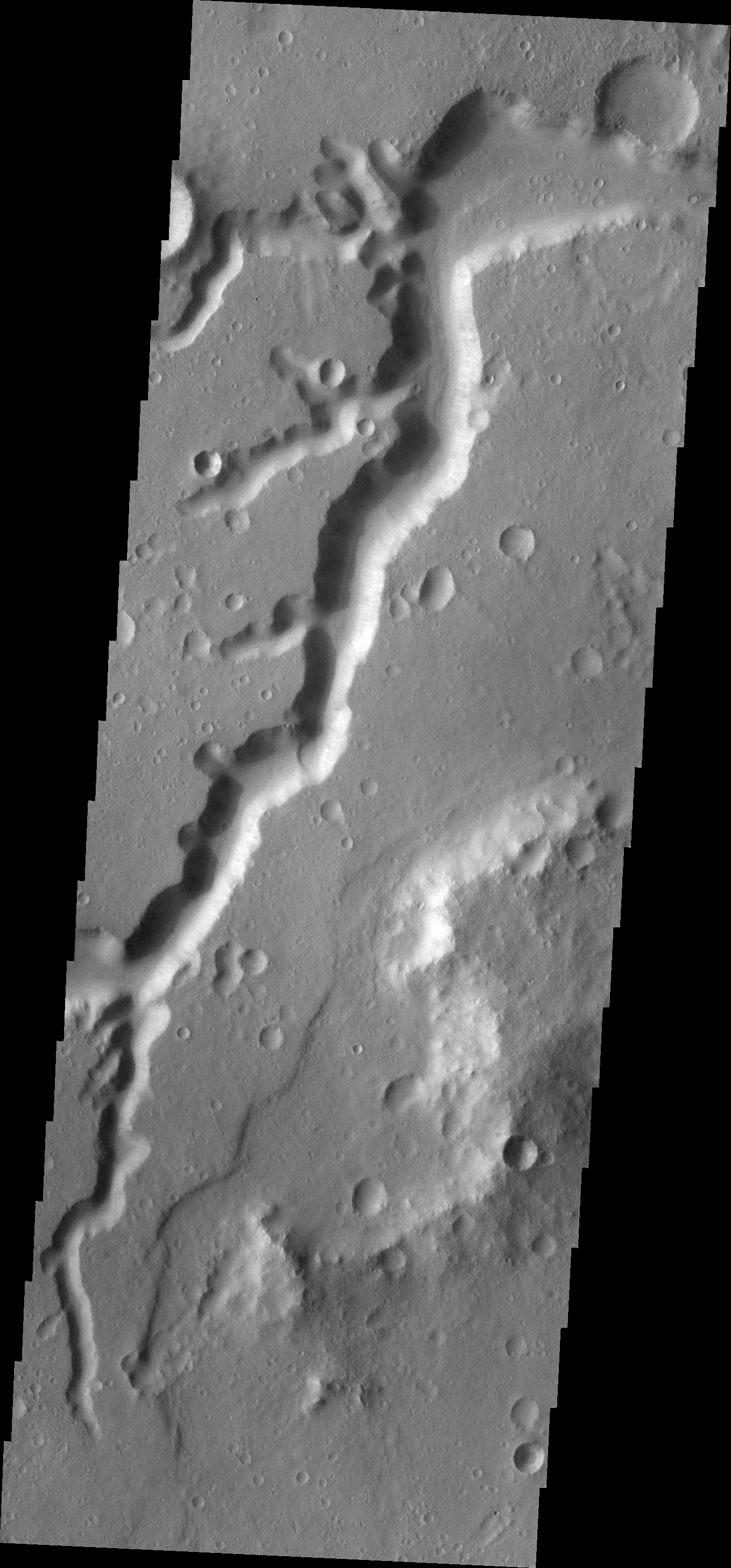
Nanedi Valles, as seen by THEMIS.

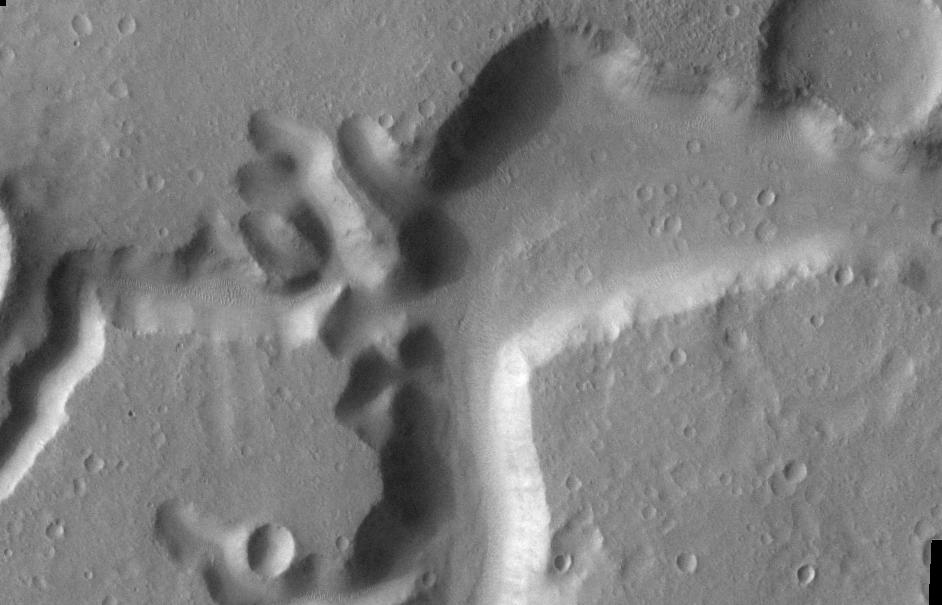
Nanedi Valles Close-up, as seen by THEMIS.

== Images from Margaritifer Sinus quadrangle ==
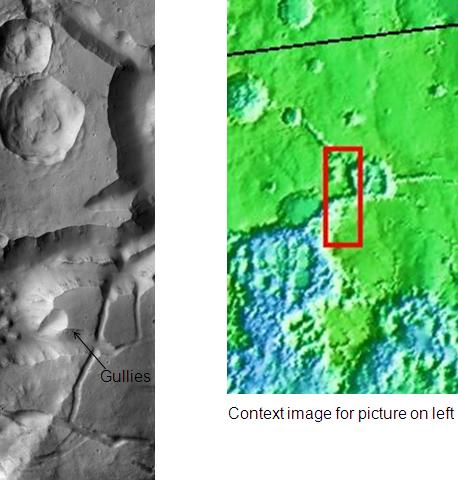
Huge canyons in Aureum Chaos. Gullies are rare at this latitude. Picture taken by THEMIS.

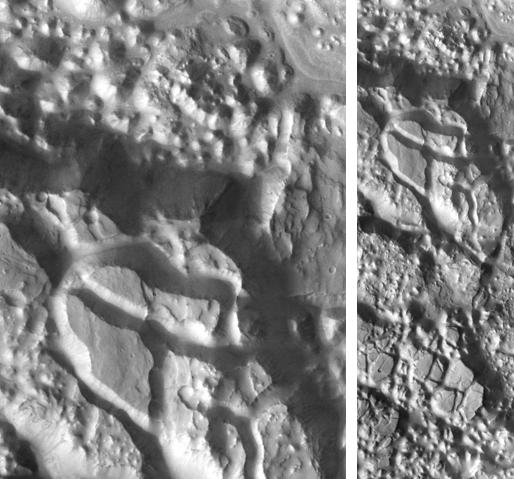
Aureum Chaos, as seen from Themis.

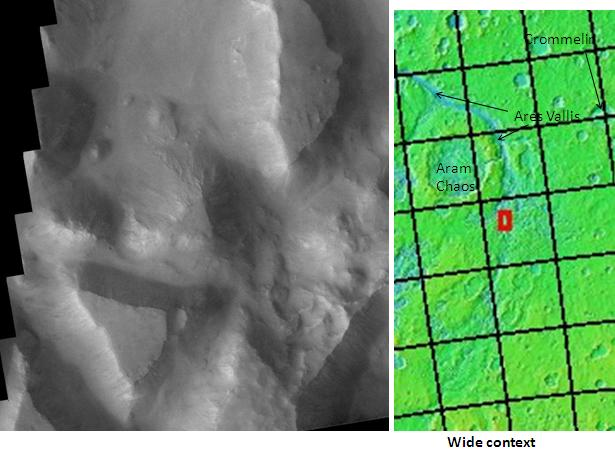
Iani Chaos, as seen by THEMIS. Sand from eroding mesas is covering brighter floor material. Click on image to see relationship of Iani Chaos to other local features.

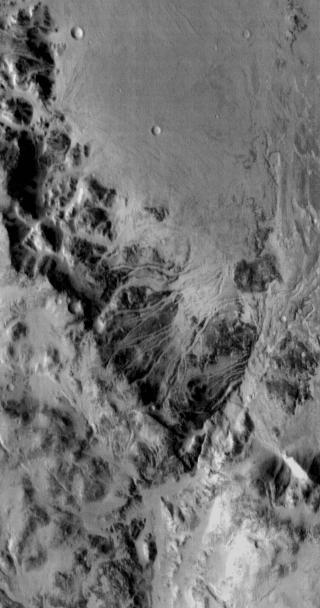
Close-up of Channels on Rim of Holden Crater, as seen by THEMIS. Click on image to see more details.

== Images from Phoenicis Lacus quadrangle ==
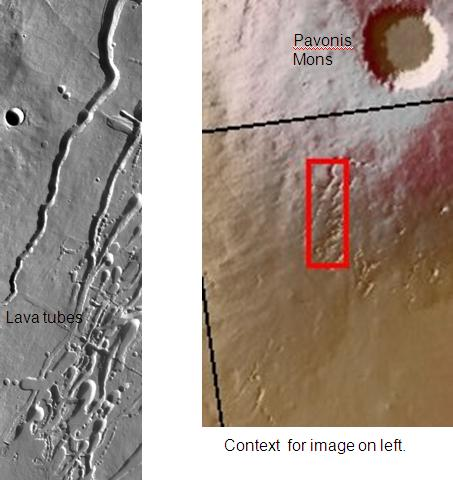
Lava tubes were once covered over with lava flowing in them, but the roofs have now collapsed and the lava has left. Also, some straight troughs (grabens) crosscut the lava channels. Picture taken by THEMIS.

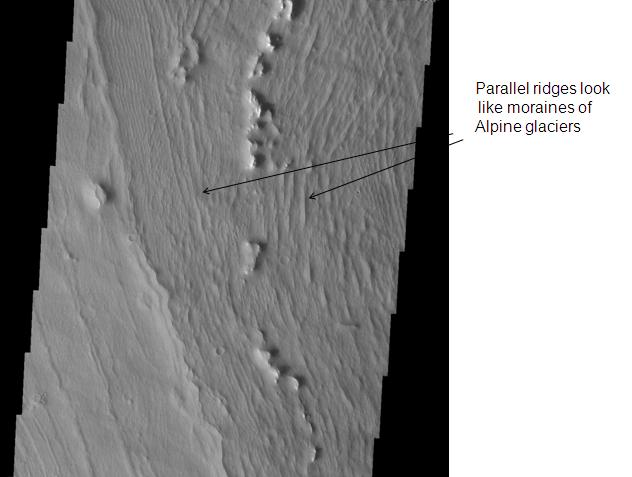
Ridges on side of Arsia Mons, a large volcano, may be moraines dropped by glacial activity

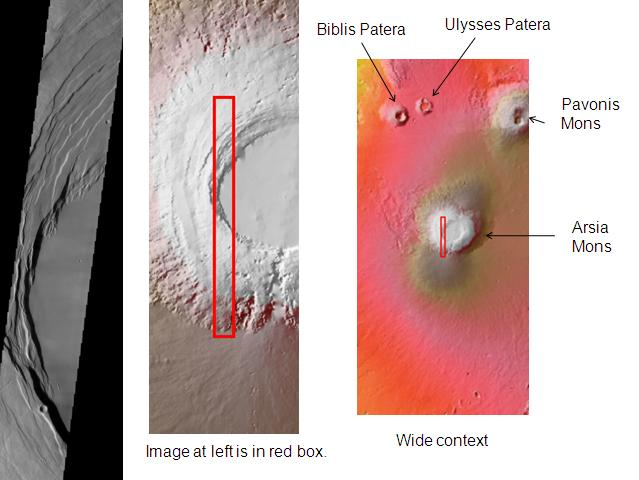
Arsia Mons showing its position among other volcanoes as seen by THEMIS.

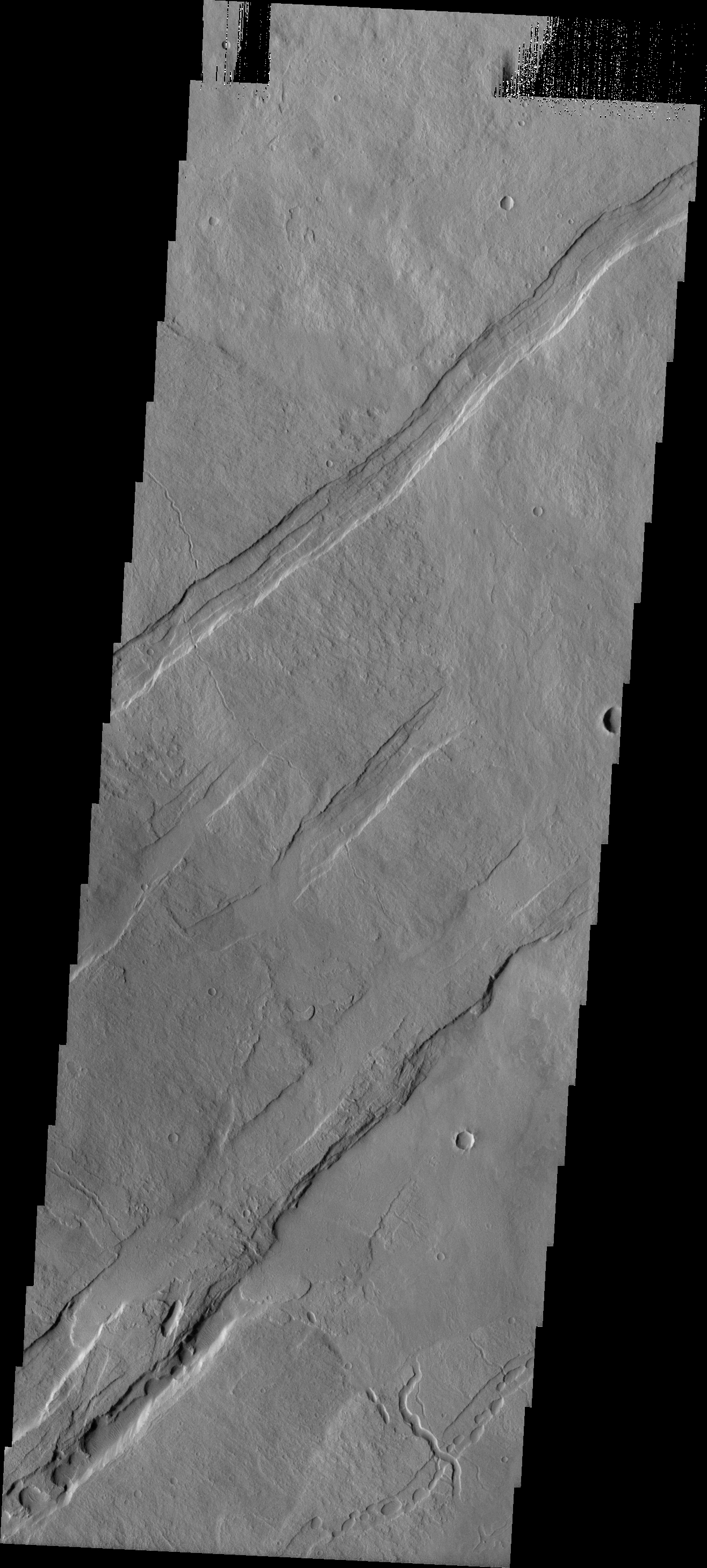
Oti Fossae, as seen by THEMIS. These parallel graben are found on the northeastern side of Arsia Mons; they are in line with the NE/SW trend of the three volcanoes in Tharsis.

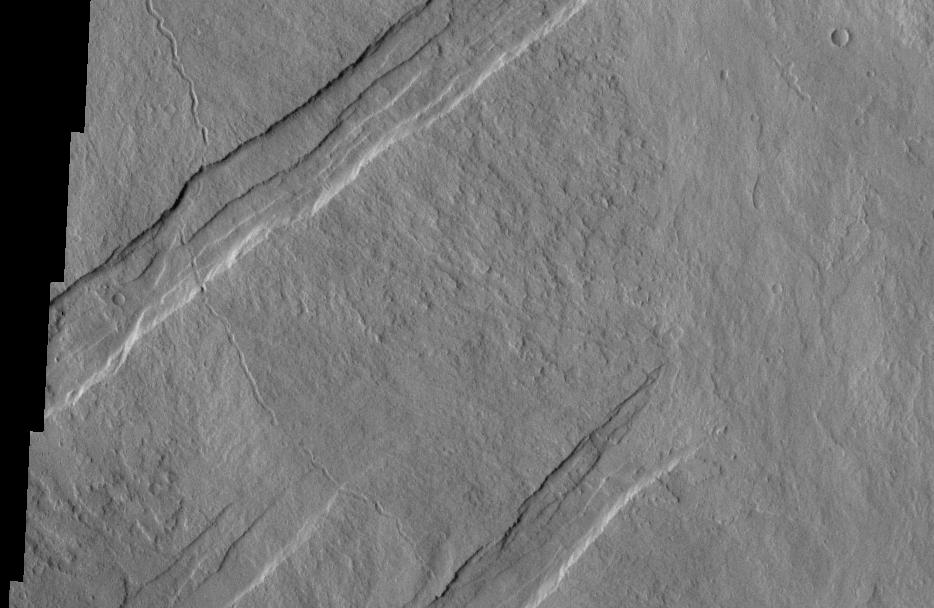
Oti Fossae, as seen by THEMIS. These parallel graben are found on the northeastern side of Arsia Mons; they are in line with the NE/SW trend of the three volcanoes in Tharsis.

== Images from Hellas quadrangle ==
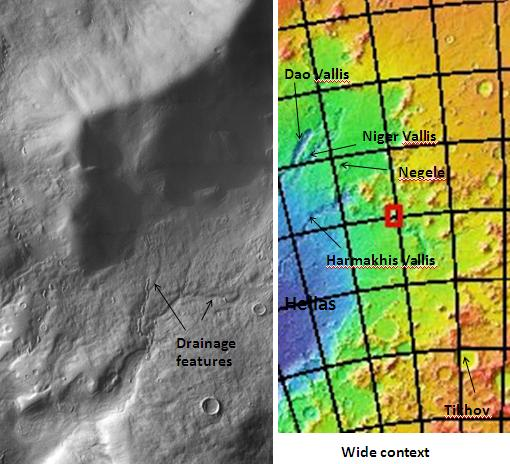
Drainage features in Reull Vallis, as seen by THEMIS. Click on image to see relationship of Reull Vallis to other features.

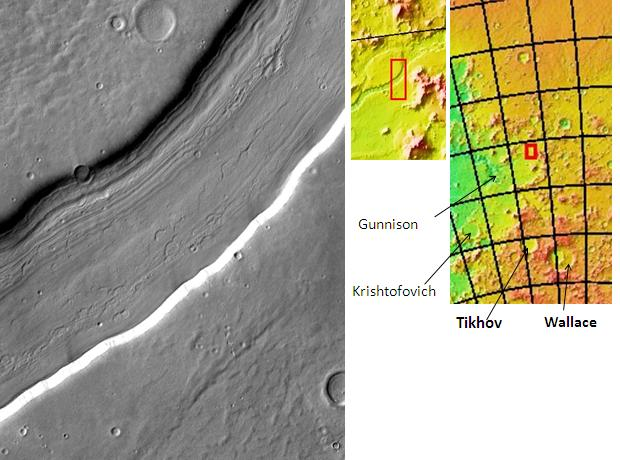
Reull Vallis with lineated floor deposits, as seen by THEMIS. Click on image to see relationship to other features.

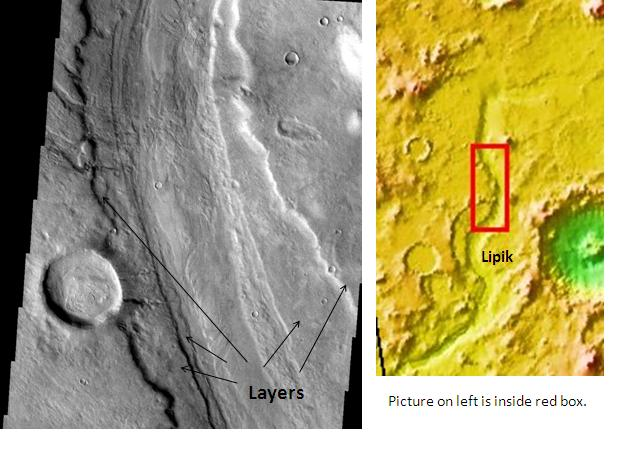
Layers in Reull Vallis, as seen by THEMIS.

Lipik Crater Channels, as seen by THEMIS.

== Images from Memnonia quadrangle ==
Mangala Vallis with a streamlined island, as seen by THEMIS.

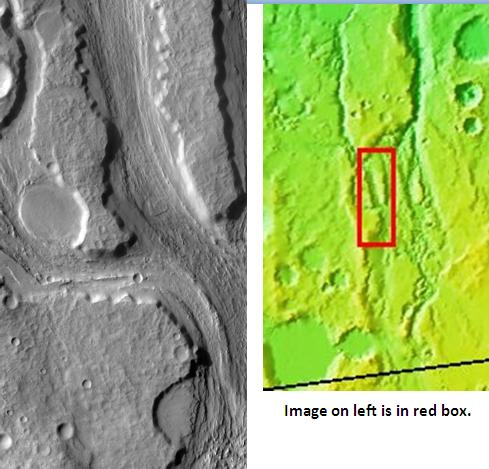
Minio Vallis, as seen by THEMIS. Minio Vallis is a small river channel near the much larger Mangala Vallis.

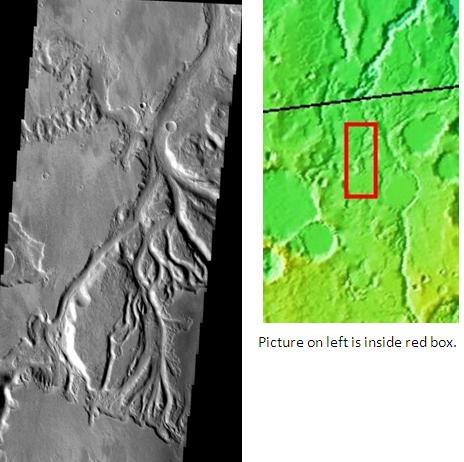
Sabis Vallis, as seen by THEMIS. The small channels are joining to form Sabis Vallis.

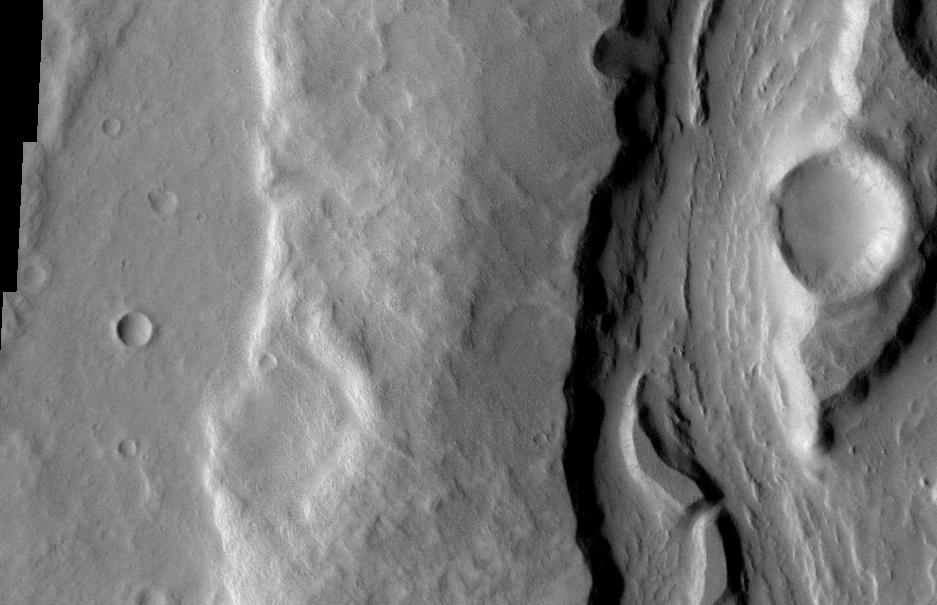
Close-up of Padus Vallis, as seen by THEMIS.

== Other Images from THEMIS ==
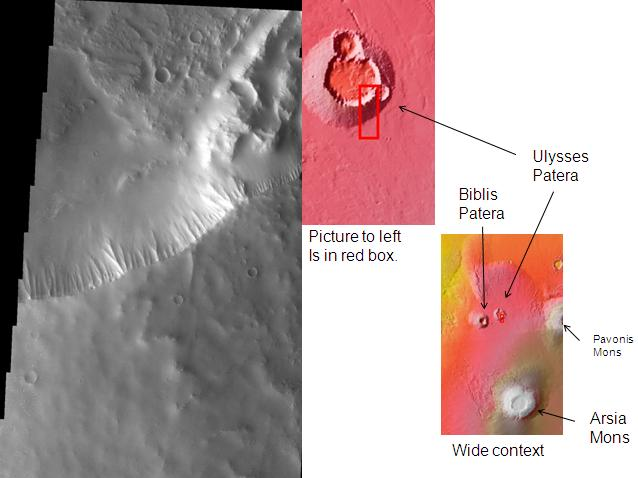
Ulysses Patera in Tharsis quadrangle, showing its location in relation to other volcanoes, as seen by THEMIS.

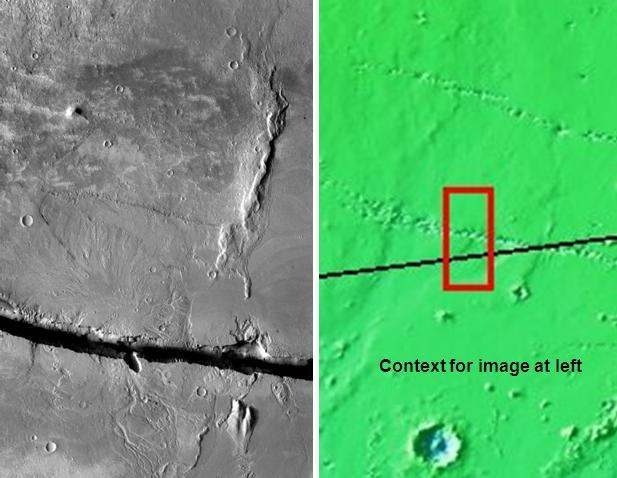
Cerberus Fossae, as seen from THEMIS. Image from Elysium quadrangle.

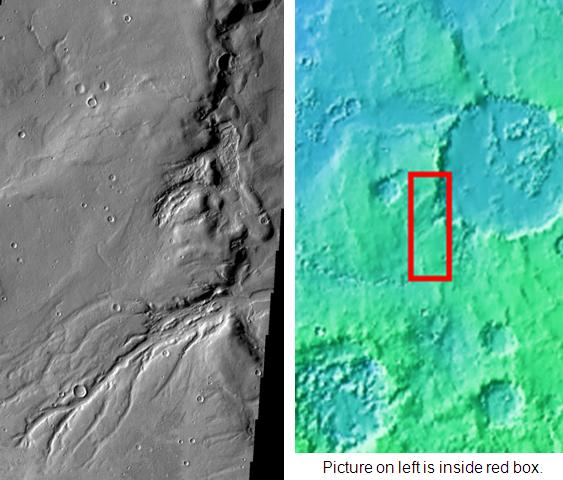
Semeykin Crater Drainage, as seen by THEMIS. Click on image to see details of beautiful drainage system. Image from Ismenius Lacus quadrangle.

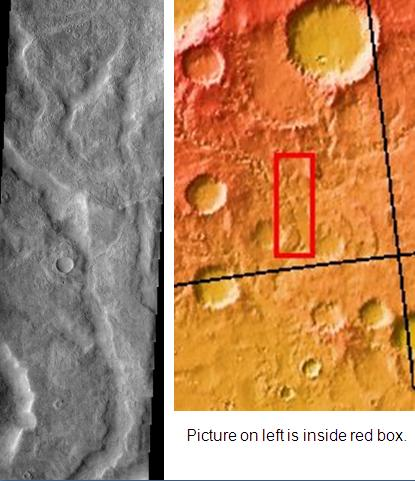
Tader Valles, as seen by THEMIS. Smooth material in channels may be a mantle in the form of dirty snow. Tader Valles is in the Phaethontis quadrangle.

== Bopolu crater ==
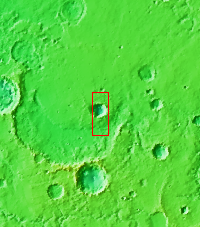
Context for image

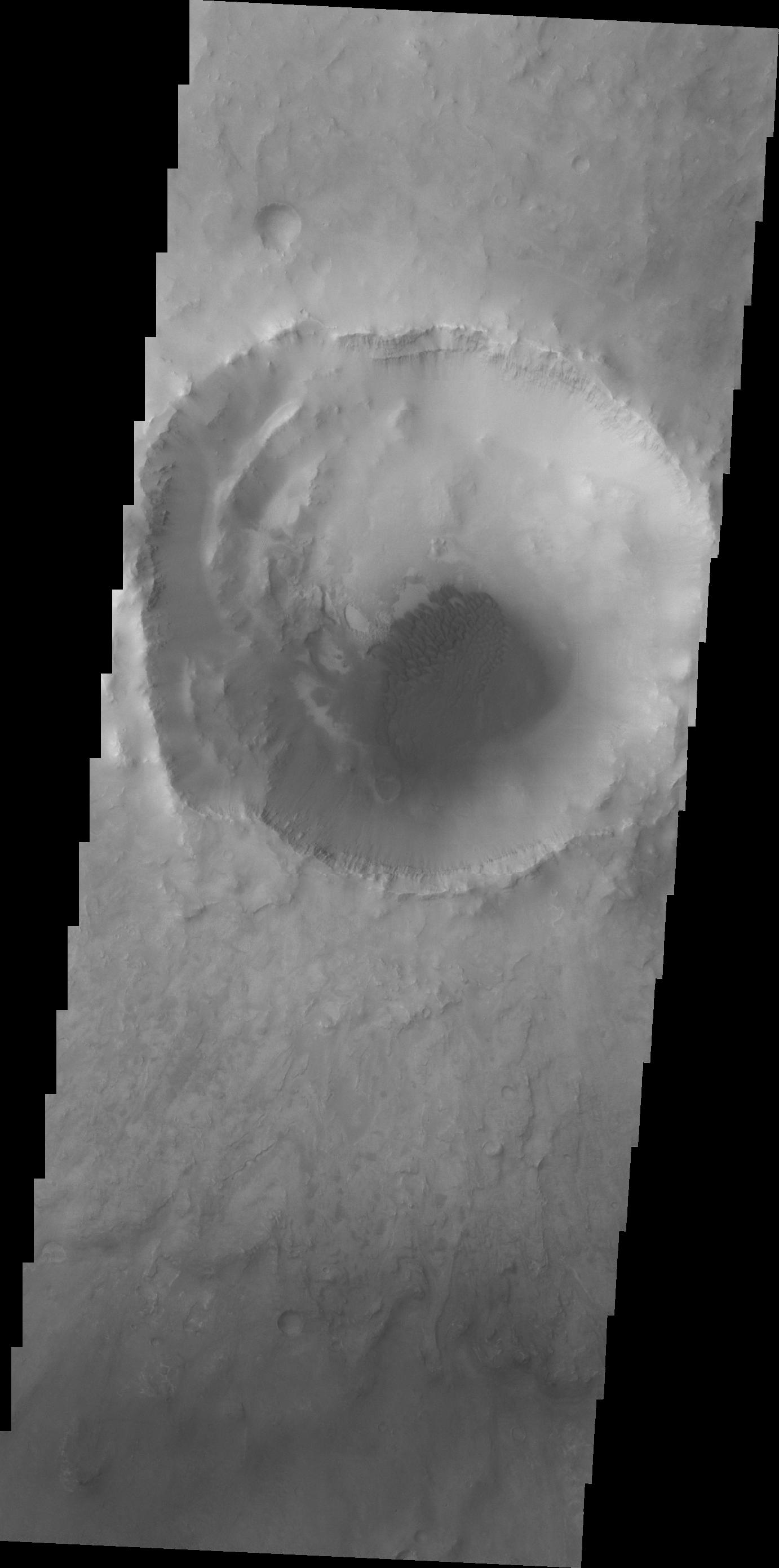
Bopolu crater, Mars

== Specifications ==
The Thermal Emission Imaging System weighs 11.2 kilograms (24.7 lb), is 54.5 x 37 x 28.6 cm (21.5 x 14.6 x 11.3 in) and runs on 14 watts of electrical power.

== See also ==
- Mars Student Imaging Project (MSIP)
