= Sirpur, Durg =

Sirpur
- village
- Country: India
- State: Chhattisgarh
- District: Durg
- Tehsil: Dondiluhara

Government
  - Body: Village panchayat

Population (2011)
  - Total: 399
- Time zone: UTC+5:30 (IST)
- Vehicle registration: CG

Sirpur is a village in Dondiluhara tehsil, Durg district, Chhattisgarh, India.

== Demographics ==
In the 2001 India census, the village of Sirpur in Durg district had a population of 381, with 193 males (50.7%) and 188 females (49.3%), for a gender ratio of 974 females per thousand males.

In the 2011 India census, the village had a population of 399, with 203 males (50.9%) and 196 females (49.12%), for a gender ratio of 967 females per thousand males.

== See also ==
- Sirpur, Kanker, a village in Pakhanjore tehsil, Kanker district
