= Virrat (crater) =

Impact crater on Mars

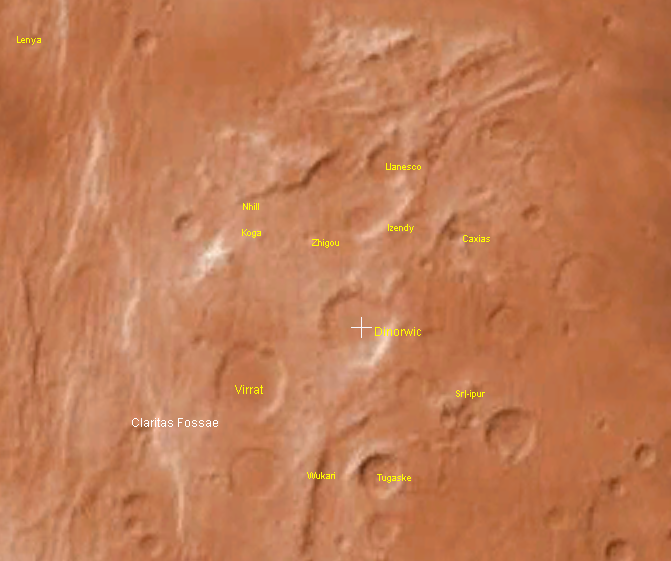
- The crater Virrat and its surroundings, in a screenshot in NASA World Wind
- Planet: Mars
- Coordinates: 30.73°S 257.12°E
- Quadrangle: Thaumasia
- Diameter: 50.67 km (31.48 mi)
- Depth: 1.3 km (0.81 mi)
- Eponym: Virrat, Finland

Virrat is an impact crater on Mars, southwest of the crater Dinorwic and northeast of Clantas Fossae. To the north are the craters Koga and Nhill. The name was approved in 1991 by the International Astronomical Union, after Virrat, a town in Finland. According to a surface age map of Mars based on US Geological Survey data, the area around Virrat is from the Noachian epoch, which places the area's age at 3.8 to 3.5 billion years ago. At the highest point on its rim, it is about 6,400 metres (21,000 ft) above zero altitude, and it is about 5,100 metres (16,700 ft) at the crater bottom, giving it a depth of 1.3 kilometres (0.81 mi).
