= Tugaske (crater) =

Crater on Mars

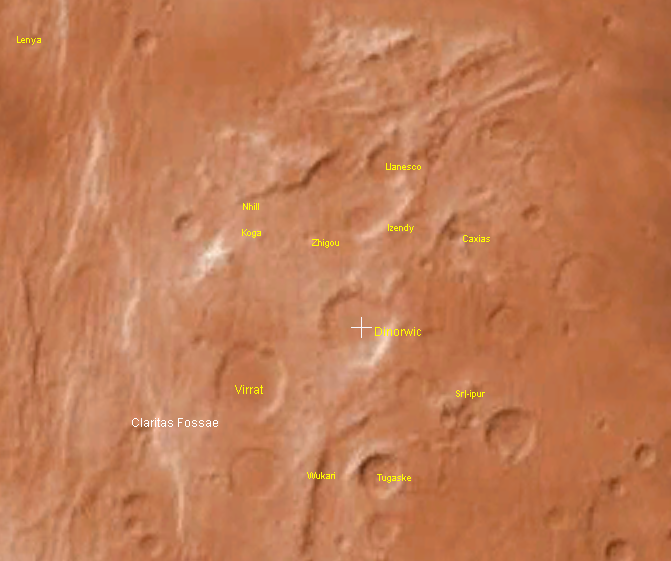
- The crater Tugaske and its surroundings, in a screenshot in NASA World Wind.
- Planet: Mars
- Coordinates: 32.1°S 101.2°W
- Quadrangle: Thaumasia
- Diameter: 31 km (19 mi)
- Eponym: Tugaske, Saskatchewan

Tugaske is a Martian impact crater, approximately 31 kilometres (19 mi) in diameter. It is located at 32.1°S, 101.2°W, south of the crater Dinorwic and southeast of the crater Virrat. It is named after a town in Saskatchewan, Canada, and its name was approved by the International Astronomical Union in 1991. According to a surface age map of Mars based on US Geological Survey data, the area around Tugaske is from the Noachian epoch, which places the area's age at 3.8 to 3.5 billion years ago. The elevation around the rim averages about 6,700 metres (22,000 ft) above zero altitude, and the deepest part of the crater floor, in the central pit, measures 5,100 metres (16,700 ft) above zero altitude. The crater is therefore about 1.6 kilometres (0.99 mi) deep.
