= Sirpur, Kondagaon =

Sirpur
- village
- Country: India
- State: Chhattisgarh
- District: Bastar
- Tehsil: Kondagaon

Government
  - Body: Village panchayat

Population (2001)
  - Total: 772
- Time zone: UTC+5:30 (IST)
- Vehicle registration: CG

Sirpur is a village in Kondagaon tehsil, Bastar district, Chhattisgarh, India.

== Demographics ==
In the 2001 India census, the village of Sirpur had a population of 772, with 382 males (49.5%) and 390 females (50.5%), for a gender ratio of 1021 females per thousand males.
