= 2001 Mars Odyssey =

NASA orbiter for geology and hydrology

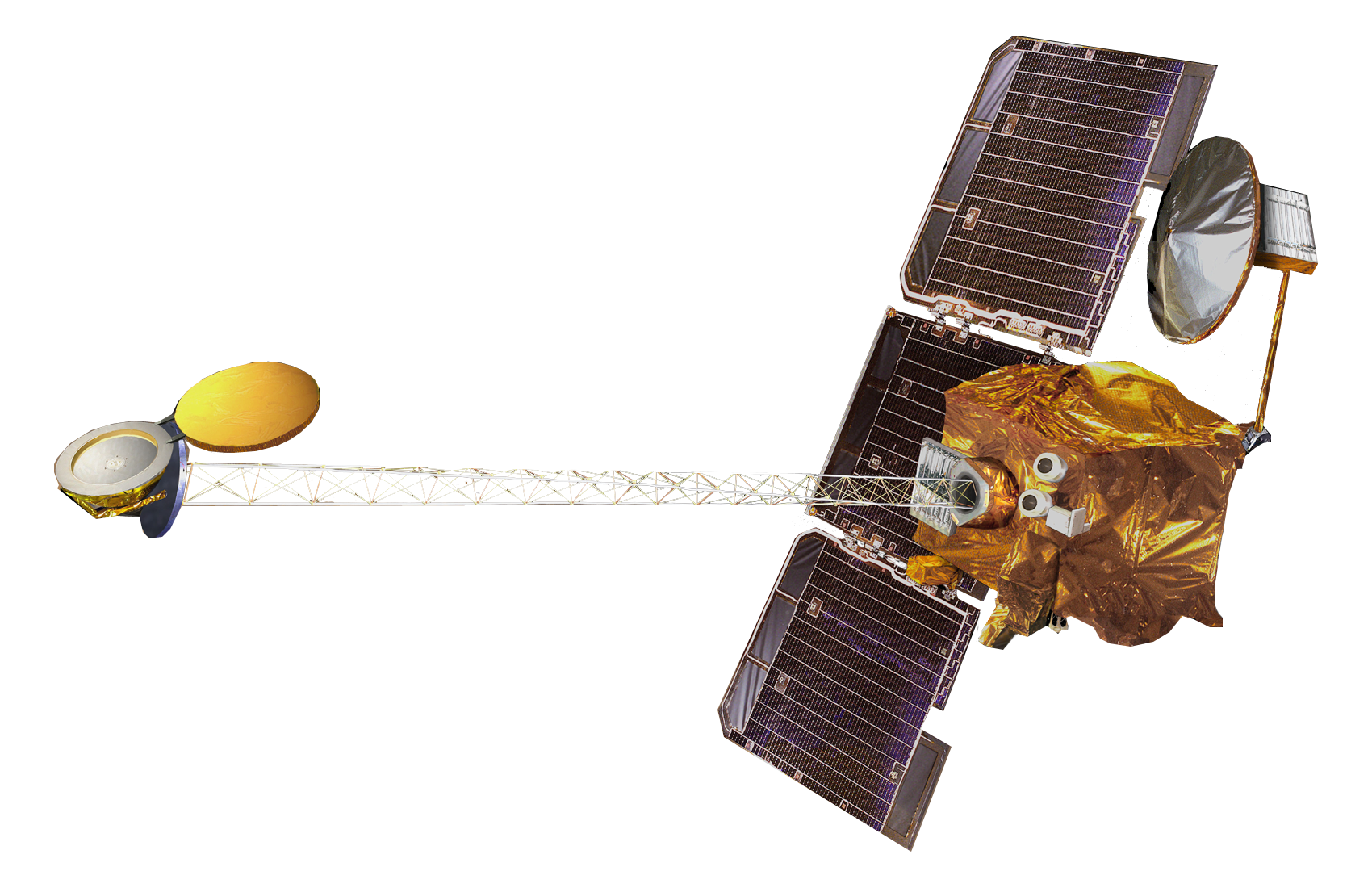
- Artist's rendering of the Mars Odyssey spacecraft
- Mission type: Mars orbiter
- Operator: NASA / JPL
- COSPAR ID: 2001-013A
- SATCAT no.: 26734
- Website: Official website
- Mission duration: Elapsed: 25 years, 6 months and 19 days from launch; 25 years and 2 days at Mars (8889 sols); En route: 6 months, 17 days; Primary mission: 32 months (1007 sols); Extended mission: 22 years, 2 months and 1 day (7880 sols) elapsed

Spacecraft properties
- Manufacturer: Lockheed Martin
- Launch mass: 725 kg
- Dry mass: 376.3 kilograms (830 lb)
- Power: 750 W

Start of mission
- Launch date: April 7, 2001, 15:02:22 UTC
- Rocket: Delta II 7925-9.5
- Launch site: Cape Canaveral SLC-17A
- Contractor: Boeing

End of mission
- Last contact: 2026 (planned)

Orbital parameters
- Reference system: Areocentric
- Regime: Sun-synchronous
- Semi-major axis: 3,793.4 km (2,357.1 mi)
- Eccentricity: 0.0
- Altitude: 400 km (250 mi)
- Inclination: 93.064°
- Period: 2 hours
- RAAN: 34.98°
- Argument of periareion: 0°
- Mean anomaly: 0°
- Epoch: October 19, 2002

Mars orbiter
- Orbital insertion: October 24, 2001, MSD 45435 12:21 AMT
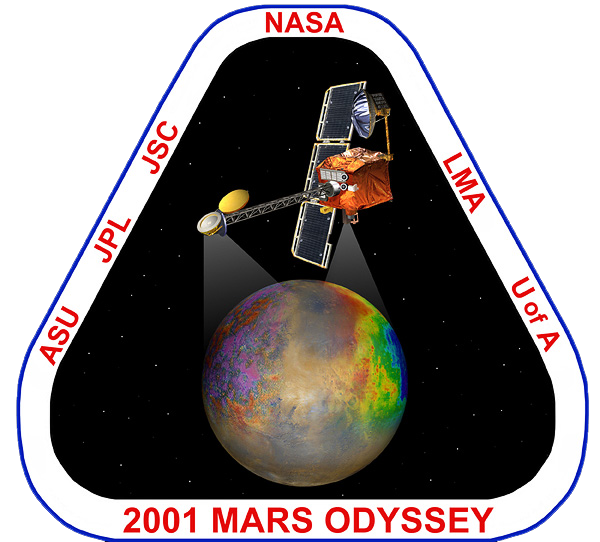
- Mars Exploration Program

2001 Mars Odyssey is a robotic spacecraft orbiting the planet Mars. The project was developed by NASA, and contracted out to Lockheed Martin, with an expected cost for the entire mission of US$297 million. Its mission is to use spectrometers and a thermal imager to detect evidence of past or present water and ice, as well as study the planet's geology and radiation environment. The data Odyssey obtains is intended to help answer the question of whether life once existed on Mars and create a risk-assessment of the radiation that future astronauts on Mars might experience. It also acts as a relay for communications between the Curiosity rover, and previously the Mars Exploration Rovers and Phoenix lander, to Earth. The mission was named as a tribute to Arthur C. Clarke, evoking the name of his and Stanley Kubrick's 1968 film 2001: A Space Odyssey.

Odyssey was launched April 7, 2001, on a Delta II rocket from Cape Canaveral Air Force Station, and reached Mars orbit on October 24, 2001, at 02:30 UTC (October 23, 19:30 PDT, 22:30 EDT). It was estimated to have enough propellant to function until the end of 2025, and as of April 2026, it is still collecting data. It currently holds the record for the longest-surviving continually active spacecraft in orbit around a planet other than Earth, ahead of the Pioneer Venus Orbiter (served 14 years) and the Mars Express (serving over 20 years), at 25 years and 2 days. As of October 2019 it is in a polar orbit around Mars with a semi-major axis of about 3,800 km or 2,400 miles.

On May 28, 2002 (sol 210), NASA reported that Odyssey's GRS instrument had detected large amounts of hydrogen, a sign that there must be ice lying within a meter of the planet's surface, and proceeded to map the distribution of water below the shallow surface. The orbiter also discovered vast deposits of bulk water ice near the surface of equatorial regions.

== Naming ==
In August 2000, NASA solicited candidate names for the mission. Out of 200 names submitted, the committee chose Astrobiological Reconnaissance and Elemental Surveyor, abbreviated ARES (a tribute to Ares, the Greek god of war). Faced with criticism that this name was not very compelling, and too aggressive, the naming committee reconvened. The candidate name "2001 Mars Odyssey" had earlier been rejected because of copyright and trademark concerns. However, NASA e-mailed Arthur C. Clarke in Sri Lanka, who responded that he would be delighted to have the mission named after his books, and he had no objections. On September 20, NASA associate administrator Ed Weiler wrote to the associate administrator for public affairs recommending a name change from ARES to 2001 Mars Odyssey. Peggy Wilhide then approved the name change.

== Mission objectives ==
- Mapping the levels of elements across the entire Martian surface
- Determine how much hydrogen exists within the "shallow subsurface"
- Develop a library of high-resolution images and spectroscopy for the mineral composition of the Martian surface
- Provide information on the morphology of the Martian surface
- Identify the "radiation-induced risk to human explorers" through a characterization of the "near-space radiation environment" on the Martian surface

== Scientific instruments ==
The three primary instruments Odyssey uses are the:

- Thermal Emission Imaging System (THEMIS). It is an onboard camera that provides visible and infrared imaging to characterize how minerals are distributed on the surface of Mars.
- Gamma Ray Spectrometer (GRS), including the High Energy Neutron Detector (HEND), provided by Russia. GRS is a collaboration between University of Arizona's Lunar and Planetary Lab., the Los Alamos National Laboratory, and Russia's Space Research Institute. It is a spectrometer focussed on the gamma-ray portion of the spectrum in order to search for various elements in the Martian atmosphere, including carbon, silicon, iron and magnesium.
- Mars Radiation Environment Experiment (MARIE). An "energetic particle spectrometer", measuring the radiation levels around Mars.

== Mission ==
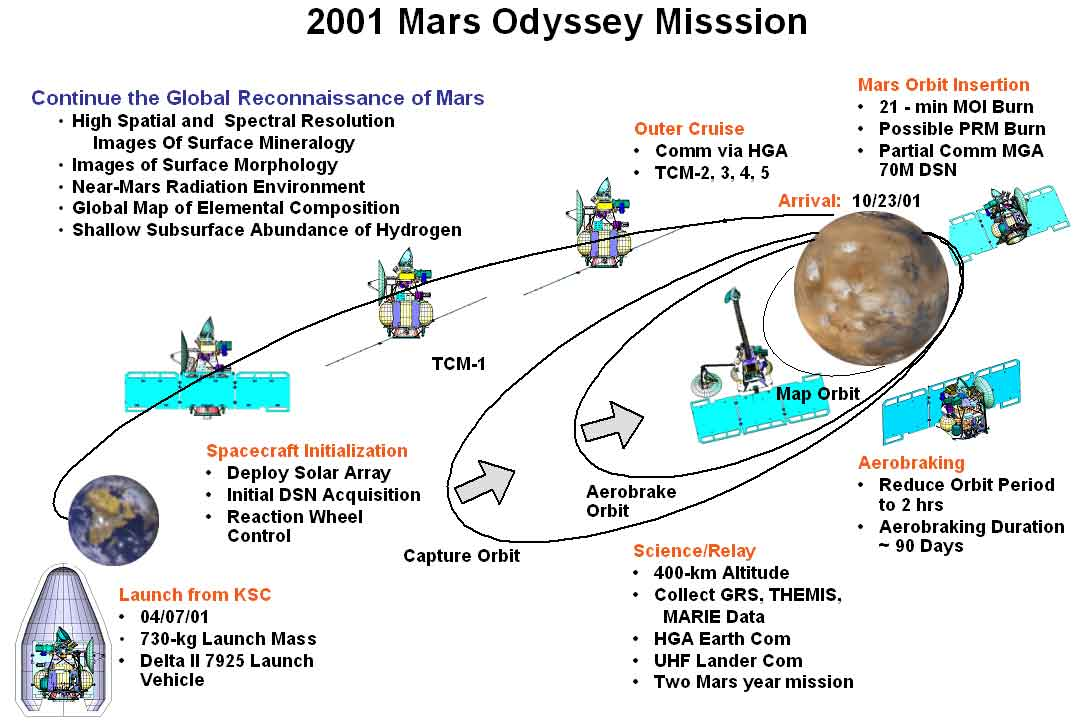
Summary of Mars Odyssey mission start

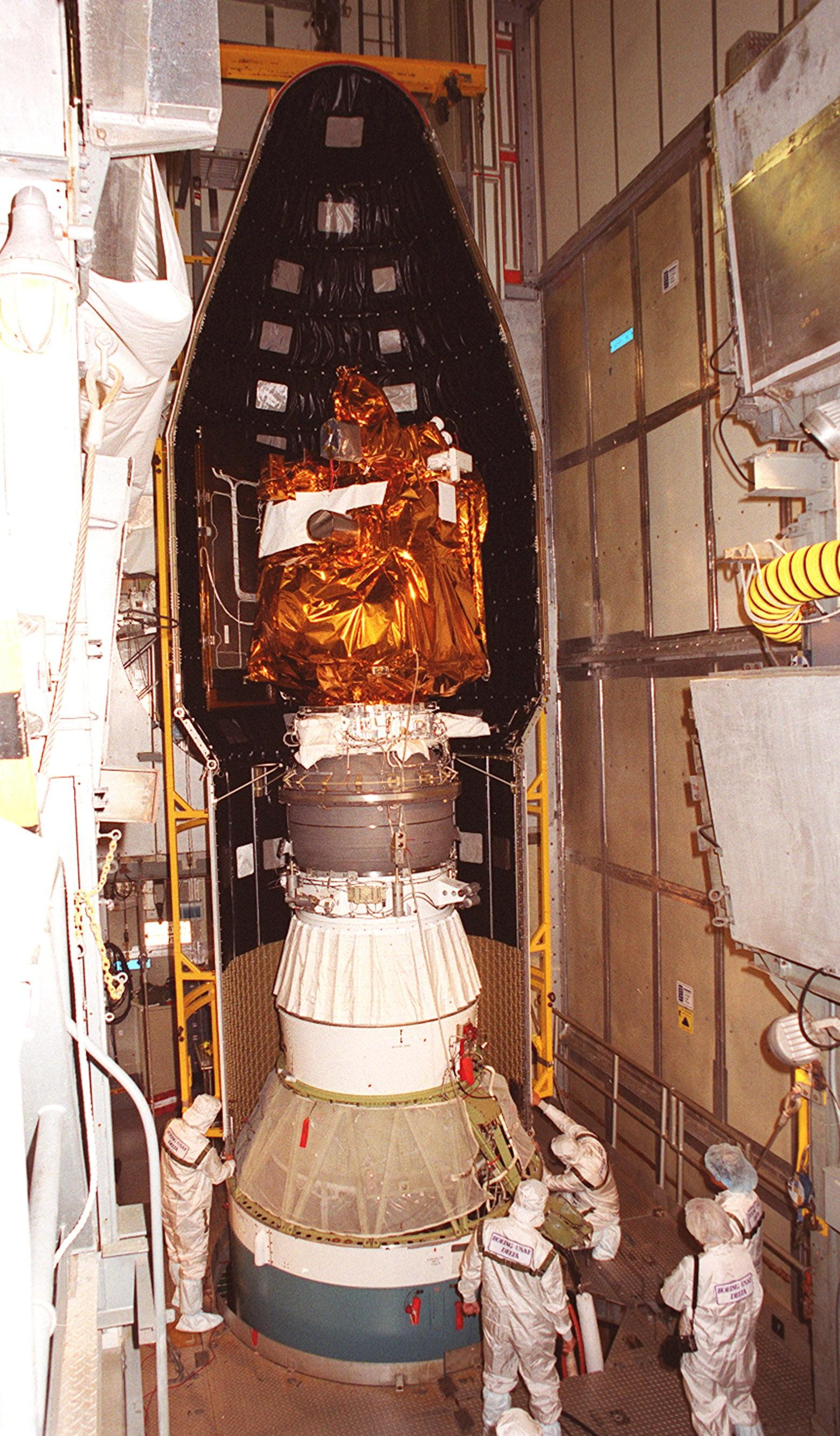
The spacecraft encapsulated in Delta II rocket fairing

Mars Odyssey launched from Cape Canaveral on April 7, 2001, and arrived at Mars about 200 days later on October 24. Upon arrival, the spacecraft's main engine fired in order to decelerate, which allowed it to be captured into orbit around Mars. Odyssey then spent about 76 days aerobraking, using aerodynamic drag from the upper reaches of the Martian atmosphere to gradually slow down and reduce and circularize its orbit. By planning to use the atmosphere of Mars to slow the spacecraft in its orbit rather than firing its engine or thrusters, Odyssey did not need an additional 200 kilograms (440 lb) of propellant on board. This reduction in spacecraft weight allowed the mission to be launched on a Delta II 7925 launch vehicle, rather than a larger, more expensive launcher.

Aerobraking ended in January 2002, and Odyssey began its science mapping mission on February 19, 2002. Odyssey's original, nominal mission lasted until August 2004, but repeated mission extensions have kept the mission active.

The payload's MARIE radiation experiment stopped taking measurements after a large solar event bombarded the Odyssey spacecraft on October 28, 2003. Engineers believe the most likely cause is that a computer chip was damaged by a solar particle smashing into the MARIE computer board.

About 85% of images and other data from NASA's twin Mars Exploration Rovers, Spirit and Opportunity, have reached Earth via communications relay by Odyssey. The orbiter helped analyze potential landing sites for the rovers and performed the same task for NASA's Phoenix mission, which landed on Mars in May 2008. Odyssey aided NASA's Mars Reconnaissance Orbiter, which reached Mars in March 2006, by monitoring atmospheric conditions during months when the newly arrived orbiter used aerobraking to alter its orbit into the desired shape.

Odyssey is in a Sun-synchronous orbit, which provides consistent lighting for its photographs. On September 30, 2008 (sol 2465) the spacecraft altered its orbit to gain better sensitivity for its infrared mapping of Martian minerals. The new orbit eliminated the use of the gamma ray detector, due to the potential for overheating the instrument at the new orbit.

By December 15, 2010, it broke the record for longest serving spacecraft at Mars, with 3,340 days of operation.

The orbiter's orientation is controlled by a set of three reaction wheels and a spare. When one failed in June 2012, the fourth was spun up and successfully brought into service. Since July 2012, Odyssey has been back in full, nominal operation mode following three weeks of 'safe' mode on remote maintenance.

Mars Odyssey's THEMIS instrument was used to help select a landing site for the Mars Science Laboratory (MSL). Several days before MSL's landing in August 2012, Odyssey's orbit was altered to ensure that it would be able to capture signals from the rover during its first few minutes on the Martian surface. Odyssey also acted as a relay for UHF radio signals from the (MSL) rover Curiosity. Because Odyssey is in a Sun-synchronous orbit, it passes over Curiosity's location twice per day, enabling regular contact with Earth.

On February 11, 2014, mission control accelerated Odyssey's drift toward a morning-daylight orbit to "enable observation of changing ground temperatures after sunrise and after sunset in thousands of places on Mars". The orbital change occurred gradually until November 2015. Those observations could yield insight about the composition of the ground and about temperature-driven processes, such as warm seasonal flows observed on some slopes, and geysers fed by spring thawing of carbon dioxide (CO_{2}) ice near Mars's poles.

On October 19, 2014, NASA reported that the Mars Odyssey Orbiter, as well as the Mars Reconnaissance Orbiter and MAVEN, were healthy after the Comet Siding Spring flyby.

In 2010, a spokesman for NASA's Jet Propulsion Laboratory stated that Odyssey could continue operating until at least 2016. This estimate has since been extended to the end of 2025.

Animation of 2001 Mars Odyssey's trajectory around Sun
2001 Mars Odyssey · Earth · Mars

Animation of 2001 Mars Odyssey's trajectory around Mars from October 24, 2001, to October 24, 2002
2001 Mars Odyssey · Mars

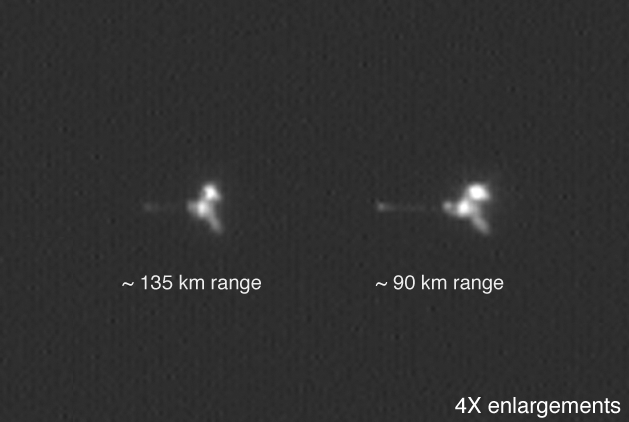
Mars Odyssey as imaged by Mars Global Surveyor

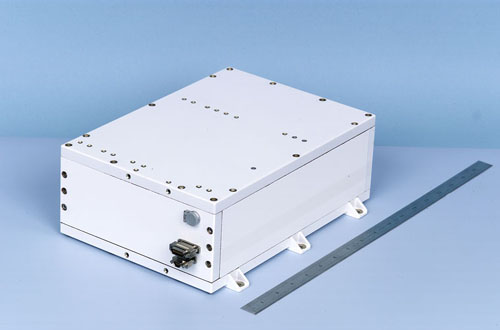
MARIE hardware, designed to measure radiation

=== Major discoveries ===
By 2008, Mars Odyssey had mapped the basic distribution of water below the shallow surface. The ground truth for its measurements came on July 31, 2008, when NASA announced that the Phoenix lander confirmed the presence of water on Mars, as predicted in 2002 based on data from the Odyssey orbiter. The science team is trying to determine whether the water ice ever thaws enough to be available for microscopic life, and if carbon-containing chemicals and other raw materials for life are present.

The orbiter also discovered vast deposits of bulk water ice near the surface of equatorial regions. Evidence for equatorial hydration is both morphological and compositional and is seen at both the Medusae Fossae formation and the Tharsis Montes.

Mars—horizon views (video; 1:24; Odyssey orbiter; THEMIS camera; May 9, 2023)

== See also ==
- Exploration of Mars
- List of Mars orbiters
- List of missions to Mars
- Mars Express Orbiter – European orbiter mission to Mars (2003–present)
- Mars Global Surveyor – NASA orbiter mission to Mars (1996–2006)
- Mars Orbiter Mission – Indian orbiter mission to Mars (2013–2022)
- Mars Student Imaging Project – American education program
- Mythodea – Music for the NASA Mission: 2001 Mars Odyssey
