= Sirpur, Saraipali =

Sirpur
- village
- Country: India
- State: Chhattisgarh
- District: Mahasamund
- Tehsil: Saraipali

Government
  - Body: Village panchayat
- Time zone: UTC+5:30 (IST)
- Vehicle registration: CG 06

Sirpur is a village in Saraipali tehsil, Mahasamund district, Chhattisgarh, India.
