= Sripur, Sylhet Division =

Tourist spot in Sylhet district

Coordinates: 25.174212°N 92.012703°E

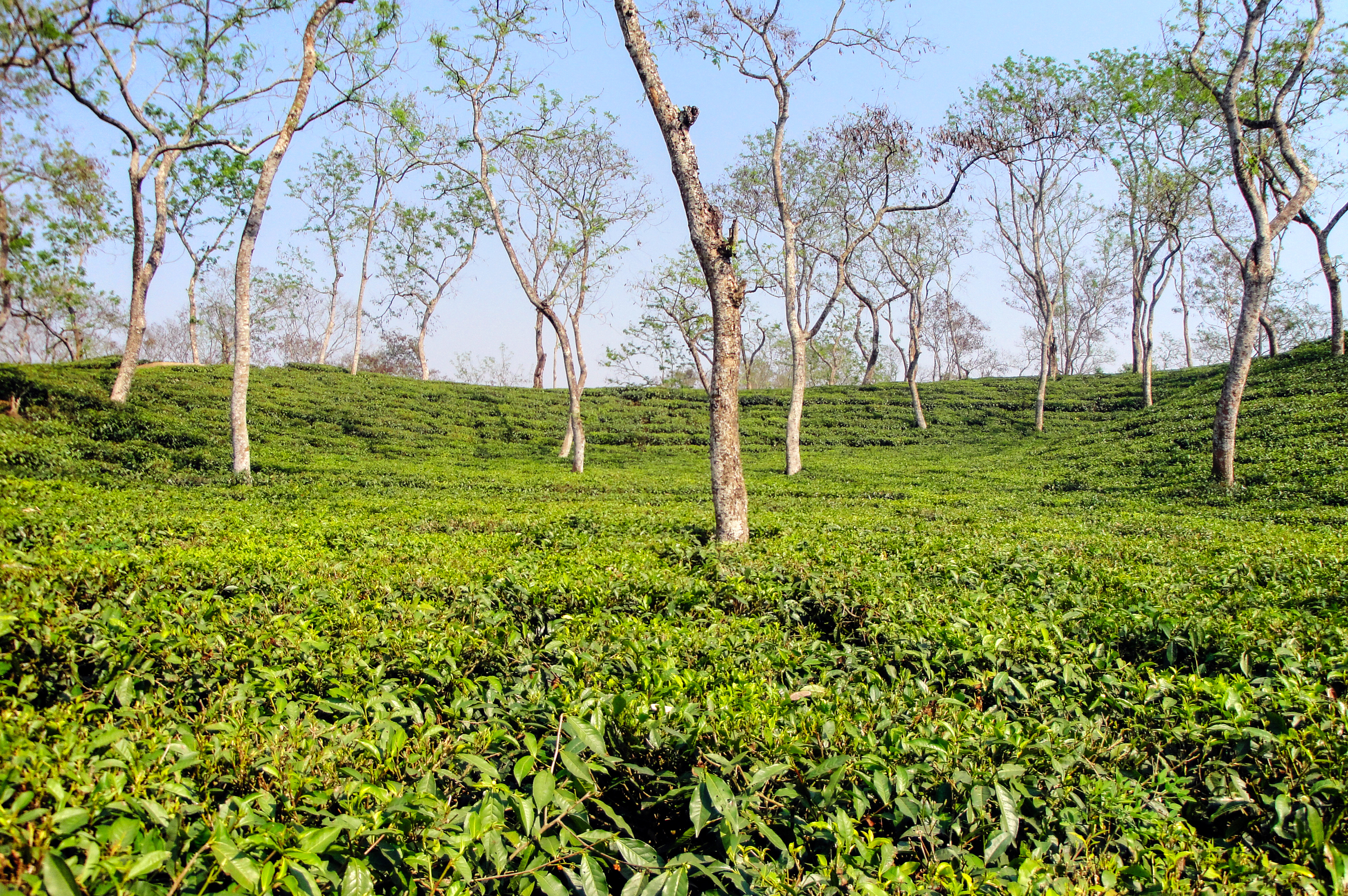
Tea garden in Sripur

Sripur is a tourist spot in Bangladesh's Sylhet district. It is well known for its waterfalls, which span across the Bangladesh-India border.

In 2001, a crater on Mars was named Srīpur in honour of the town.

== Gallery ==
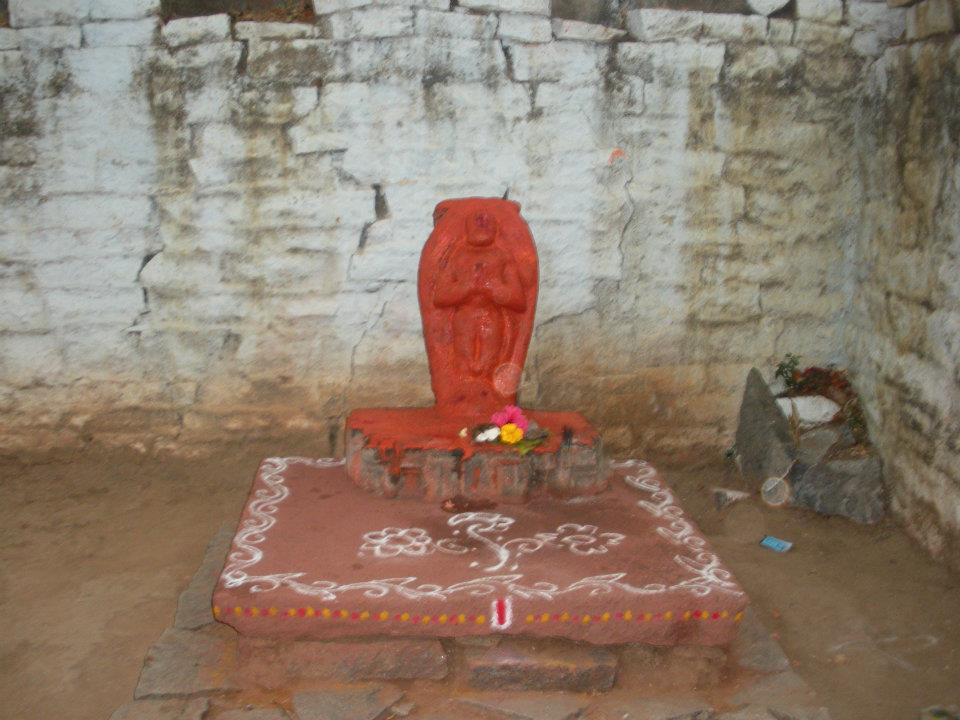

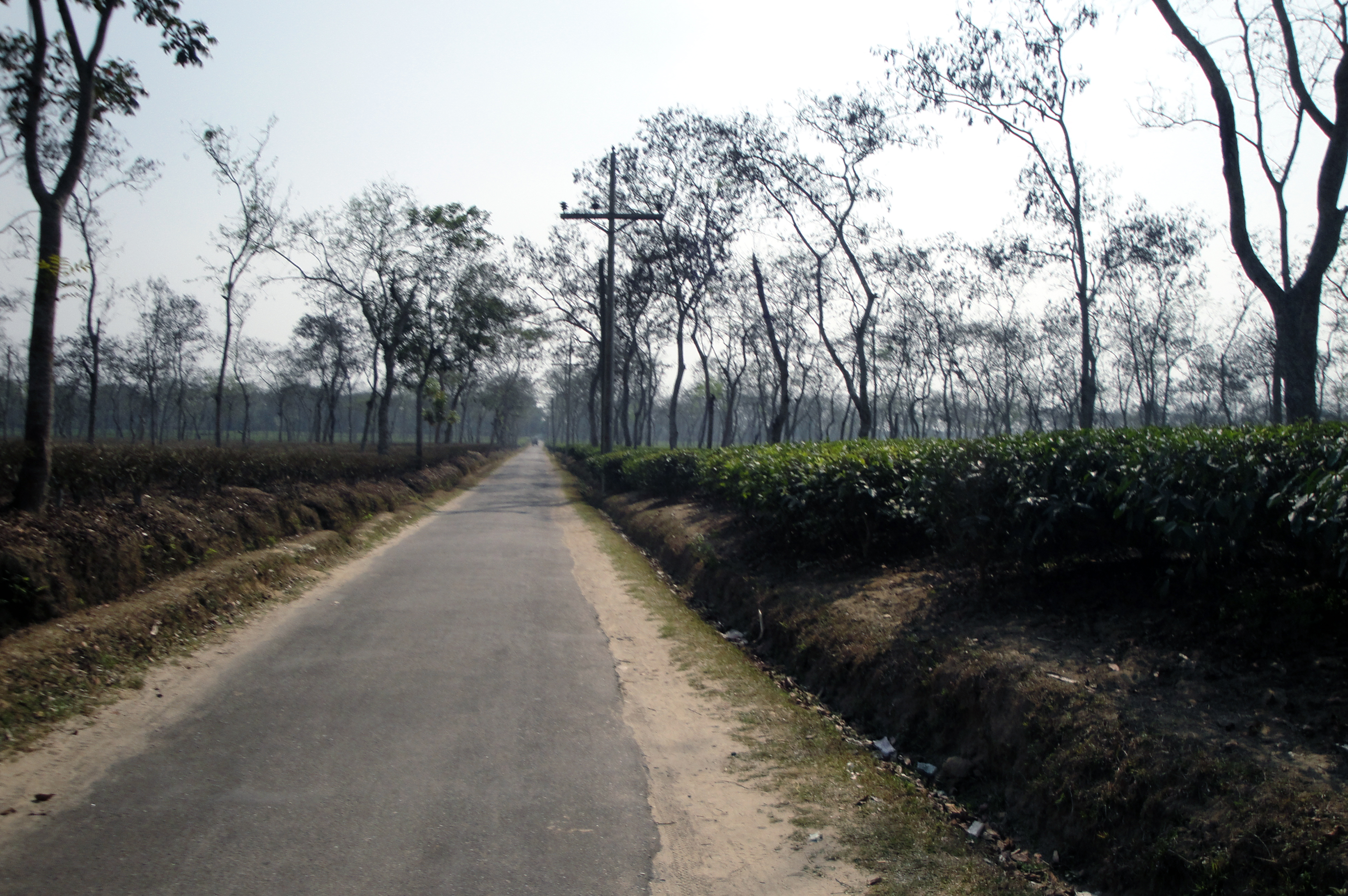
