= Sripur Halt railway station =

Railway station in West Bengal

General information
- Location: Ballabhpur, Sripur, Malda district, West Bengal; India
- Coordinates: 24°15′25″N 87°02′38″E
- Elevation: 27 m (89 ft)
- System: Passenger train station
- Owner: Indian Railways
- Operator: Northeast Frontier Railway
- Line: Howrah–New Jalpaiguri line
- Platforms: 2
- Tracks: 2

Construction
- Structure type: Standard (on ground station)

Other information
- Status: Active
- Station code: SPRU
- Zone(s): Northeast Frontier Railway
- Division(s): Katihar

History
- Former names: East Indian Railway Company

Services
Preceding station	Indian Railways	Following station
Samsi towards ?	Eastern Railway zone Howrah–New Jalpaiguri line	Kumarganj towards ?
Location

Sripur Halt railway station is a halt railway station on the Howrah–New Jalpaiguri line of Katihar railway division of Northeast Frontier Railway Zone. It is situated at Ballabhpur, Sripur of Malda district in the Indian state of West Bengal. Total 10 passenger trains stop at Sripur Halt railway station.
