= Sirpur, Kanker =

Sirpur
- village
- Country: India
- State: Chhattisgarh
- District: Kanker
- Tehsil: Pakhanjore Tehsil

Government
  - Body: Village panchayat
- Time zone: UTC+5:30 (IST)
- Vehicle registration: CG

Sirpur is a village in Pakhanjore Tehsil, Kanker district, Chhattisgarh, India.

== See also ==
- Sirpur, Durg, a village in Dondiluhara tehsil, Durg district
