= Sripur, Mahottari =

Coordinates: 26°52′N 85°47′E

Shreepur श्रीपुर
- Village Development Committee
- Nickname: औरही नागरपालिका
- Interactive map of Shreepur
- Country: Nepal
- Zone: Janakpur Zone
- District: Mahottari District

Government
  - Type: madhedh sarkar

Population (2019)
  - Total: 21,765
- Time zone: UTC+5:45 (Nepal Time)

Shreepur is a Village Development Committee in Mahottari District in the Janakpur Zone of south-eastern Nepal. At the time of the 1991 Nepal census it had a population of 7666 people residing in 1472 individual households.
