= Dinorwic (crater) =

Crater on Mars

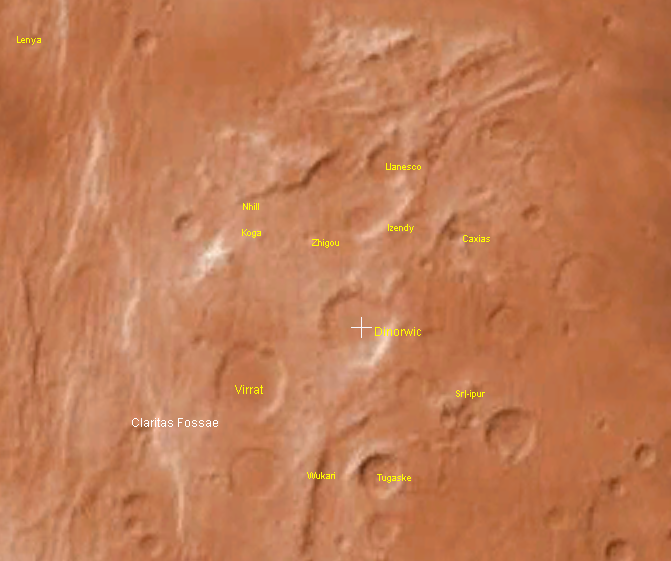
- The crater Dinorwic and its surroundings, in a screenshot in NASA World Wind.
- Planet: Mars
- Coordinates: 30.03°S 258.54°E
- Quadrangle: Thaumasia
- Diameter: 51.33 km
- Depth: 1.6 km
- Eponym: Dinorwic, Ontario

Dinorwic is a Martian impact crater, approximately 51 kilometers in diameter. It is named after the town in Ontario, Canada. Its name was approved by the International Astronomical Union in 1991. According to a surface age map of Mars based on US Geological Survey data, the area around Dinorwic is from the Noachian epoch, which places the area's age at 3.8 to 3.5 billion years ago. At the crater's rim, it is about 7,600 meters above zero altitude, and it is about 5,950 meters above zero altitude at its floor, giving it a depth of 1.6 kilometers.

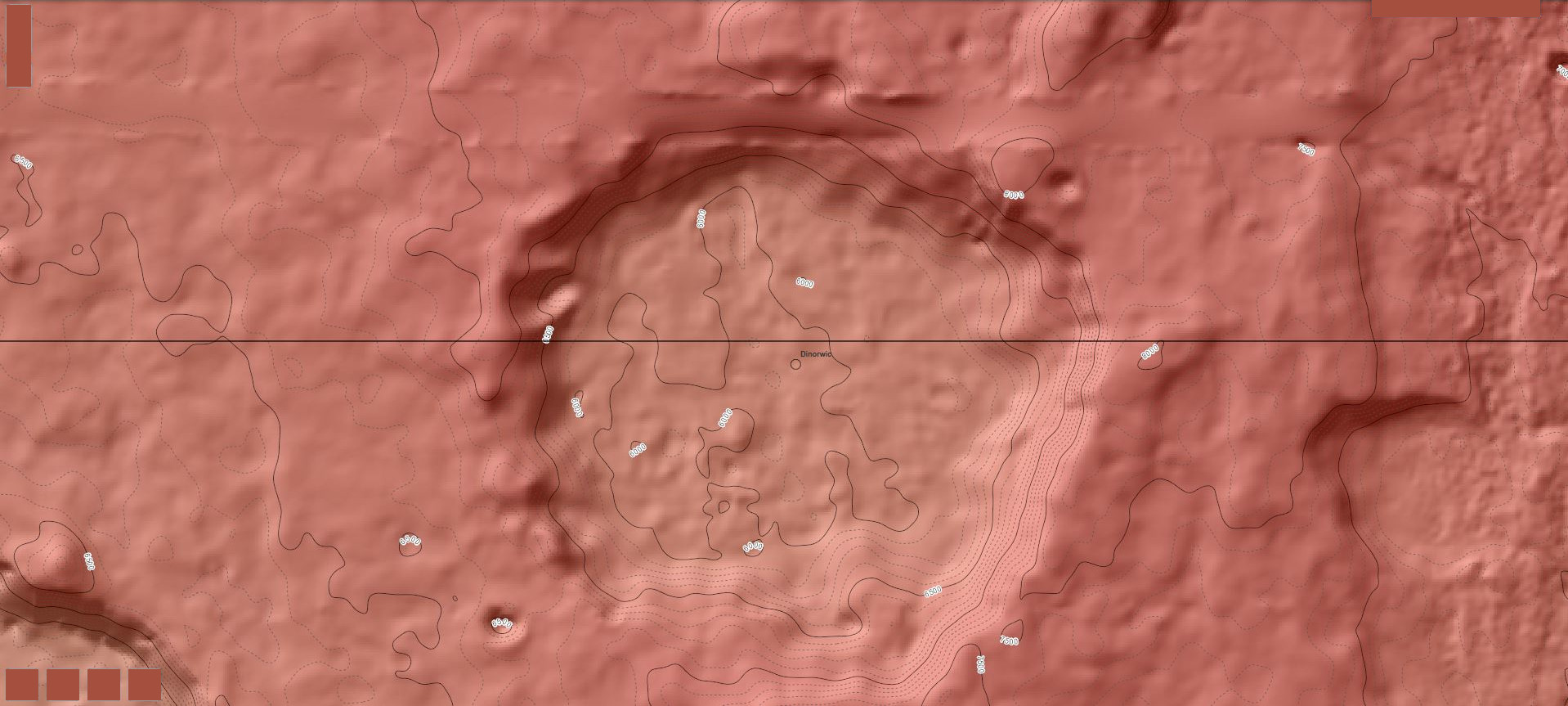
A topographic map created using Mars Orbiter Laser Altimeter (MOLA) data. This map shows the elevation Dinorwic crater relative to Martian areoid.

It is located northeast of the crater Virrat and north of the crater Tugaske. To the northeast of Dinorwic is the crater Caxias, and farther north is the crater Llanesco.
