= S. Bhoothalingam =

Indian economist, civil servant (born 1909)

Personal details
- Born: Subrahmanya Bhoothalingam; February 22, 1909 Travancore, British Raj (now in Kerala, India)
- Died: November 28, 1990 (aged 81) Hyderabad, Andhra Pradesh (now in Telangana), India
- Education: Caius College, Cambridge

Subrahmanya Bhoothalingam OBE (22 February 1909 - 28 November 1990) was an Indian economist and civil servant who was instrumental in establishing India's steel industry. He successively served as Secretary (Commerce and Industry), Secretary (Iron and Steel) and Finance Secretary of India.

== Career ==
Bhoothalingam was born in the salute state of Travancore. After completing a B.A. (Economics) at Caius College, Cambridge, he joined the Indian Civil Service in October 1931. Beginning his career in the then Madras Presidency of British India as an assistant collector and magistrate, he was successively promoted to sub-collector and joint magistrate in May 1933 and to special assistant settlement officer in November 1934. In December 1938, he was transferred to the Reserve Bank of India as an officer in its agricultural audit department. During the Second World War, he was transferred to the service of the Government of India in January 1940 as an officer in the Department of Supply, with the rank of under-secretary. He was promoted to deputy secretary in the same department in July 1942. In the imperial 1945 New Year Honours list, he was appointed an Officer of the Order of the British Empire (OBE). Sent on deputation to Britain in early 1945, he was promoted to joint secretary in October 1946.

Following the independence of India in August 1947 and the dissolution of the ICS, Bhoothalingam transferred to the new Indian Administrative Service (IAS). In June 1952, he was promoted to Secretary in the Ministry of Commerce and Industry, and was appointed Secretary in the Ministry of Iron and Steel in July 1955, a post he occupied through 1960. During his tenure as Secretary (Iron and Steel), Bhoothalingam established Hindustan Steel Limited in 1954, which subsequently became the Steel Authority of India. He was instrumental in erecting India's first three public-sector steel plants: Rourkela, Bhilai and Durgapur. After 1960, Bhoothalingam was appointed Secretary for Economic Affairs and Coordination in the Finance Ministry. He retired as Finance Secretary of India in 1966.

After retiring from government service, Bhoothalingam headed several government commissions on taxation and finance, and served on the boards of various Indian and multinational firms, including Glaxo India and American Express. He later served as Director-General of the National Council of Applied Economic Research (NCAER), an economic think-tank in New Delhi, for seven years. Bhoothalingam died in Hyderabad in 1990, aged 81.

== Personal life ==
Bhoothalingam was married to Mathuram "Krithika" (1915–2009), a noted Tamil novelist and playwright. The couple had a daughter, Mina Swaminathan, who married the distinguished agricultural geneticist M. S. Swaminathan, and had three children. Among Bhoothalingam's grandchildren is the distinguished paediatrician Soumya Swaminathan.

A linguist and Francophile who was fluent in French, and also knew Russian, Bhoothalingam served as President of the Alliance Francaise of New Delhi for many years. He was decorated with the Legion of Honour by the French government in 1983.
