= Elsie F. Weil =

American writer (1889–c.1950)

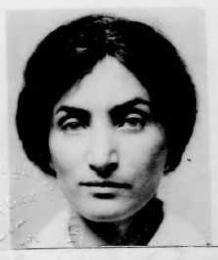
- Elsie F. Weil, from her 1924 passport application
- Born: April 27, 1889; Chicago, Illinois, U.S.
- Died: After April 1950
- Occupations: Writer, journalist, editor

Elsie Frances Weil (April 27, 1889 – after April 1950) was an American writer. She was associate editor of Asia magazine from 1917 to 1925, and managing editor of the same journal from 1932 to 1946. In the 1920s, she wrote about Asian economic and cultural topics for The New York Times.

== Early life and education ==
Weil was born in Chicago, the daughter of Jacob Weil and Paulina Danziger Weil. Both parents were born in Germany; her father died in 1897. She graduated from Hyde Park High School, and completed a bachelor's degree at the University of Chicago in 1910. She was a member of Phi Beta Kappa.

== Career ==
Weil and her partner Gertrude Emerson traveled in Korea, Japan, India, and China in 1915 and 1916, interviewing political leaders and reporting on sports, theatre, and other cultural events. She reported from Morocco in 1919, and from Bermuda in 1926, and from the American West in 1928. She corresponded with Edna W. Underwood, Rose Wilder Lane, Kenneth Durant, and Ernestine Evans in the 1910s and 1920s. Weil was associate editor of Asia magazine from 1917 to 1925, and managing editor of the same journal from 1932 until 1946, when it was rebranded as United Nations World.

In 1928, after flying from Chicago to Kansas City as a passenger on an airmail plane, she suggested that towns paint their names on roofs, to be visible to passengers flying overhead.

== Publications ==
Many of Weil's travel essays were published in Asia magazine, where she was an editor; others appeared in Travel Magazine, The Lone Hand, World Outlook, The Evening Post, The New York Times, The New York Times Magazine, Theatre Magazine, and Lippincott's. She wrote the foreword to Thai writer Kumut Chandruang's English-language memoir, My Boyhood in Siam, published in 1938. As an editor, she also worked with Margaret Landon on the book that became Anna and the King of Siam (1944).

=== Chicago topics ===
- "The Hull House Players" (1913)
- "Gymnastics for Women at Chicago University" (1913)
- "Girl Athletes of University of Chicago" (1913)
- "Eugene Field, the Informal" (1915)

=== Asia topics ===
- "Korea: Japan's Willing Vassal" (1916, with Gertrude Emerson)
- "Japan Wants Justice: Interview with Count Okuma, Premier of Japan" (1916, with Gertrude Emerson)
- "New Homes for China's Millions" (1917, with Gertrude Emerson)
- "The Wu-Han Cities" (1917)
- "Japan Learns to Do Business" (1917)
- "The Boy Emperor of China" (1917)
- "Training Japanese for Emigration" (1917)
- "A Little Woman of Big Enterprises" (1918, profile of Yone Suzuki)
- "Modern Drama Finds Welcome on the Japanese Native Stage" (1918)
- "The Land Where Beauty is a Necessity" (1918)
- "Bokhara and Samarkhand" (1918)
- "Buddha's Path in China" (1919)
- "Craftsmen of Old Japan" (1920)
- "Pipes of Peace" (1922)
- "Hungry India Learning American Farm Methods" (1926)
- "Rubber Future in Philippines" (1926)
- "Heirs of the Japanese Sun Goddess" (1927)
- "Turkish Motif Offered Our Architecture" (1929)
- "Unseeing Eyes of the East" (1932)

=== Other topics ===
- "Through the Gates of the Moghreb" (1919)
- "Egypt Invites Bigger Trade" (1926)
- "Guarding New York's Food is a Huge Task" (1926)
- "New York a Centre of Pan-American Life" (1929)
- "Preserving the Indian Sign Language" (1931)
- "Of Orientals Shipwrecked in America" (1937)
- "Topsy-Turvy Household" (1950, book review)

== Personal life ==
Weil had a longtime professional and personal relationship with fellow writer Gertrude Emerson, beginning in 1914; they traveled together, and shared an apartment in New York City. Emerson married a man in India in 1932. Weil's papers are in the University of Michigan's William L. Clements Library.
