= Donald C. Thompson (photographer) =

American war photographer

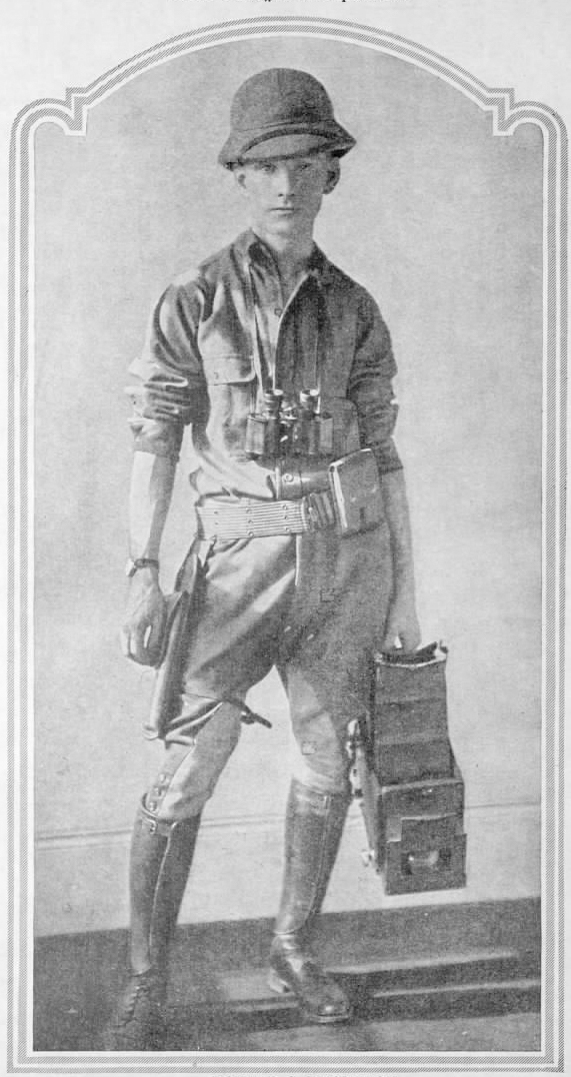
- Thompson c. 1918
- Born: January 19, 1885; Topeka, Kansas, United States
- Died: July 8, 1947 (aged 62); Hondo, California, United States
- Known for: War photography
- Notable work: War As It Really Is

Donald C. Thompson (19 January 1885 – 8 July 1947) was an American war photographer, cinematographer, producer and director known primarily for his still and motion picture work during World War I. Thompson repeatedly risked his life to capture the war on film, and then would return to the United States to share his experiences and images in public lectures, bringing the horrors of the war to US audiences. His work was widely shown in the US prompting one magazine to note that "nearly every reader of news of the great European war is familiar with the name of Donald C. Thompson, known the world over as ‘The War Photographer from Kansas.’” War correspondent E. Alexander Powell said that Thompson had “more chilled-steel nerve than any man I know.”

== Early life ==
Thompson was most likely born on 19 January 1885 in Kansas. Birth records do not exist for that time period in Kansas and Thompson often gave misleading birthdates and places and the name of his father on official documents like passport applications. He was the second son of Sarah Alice Conkling (Conklin). Conkling, who lived in Thompsonsville in Jefferson County, married Thomas A. Thompson, a physician and widower from Kentucky, who was living in nearby Grantville. It does not appear that Thompson lived with Conkling for long. By 1885, Sarah was living with her parents in Thompsonville and listed as "Sarah Hofman" in the Kansas Census. She had a five-month old son named "Donilan Hofman" and a three-year-old named "Harry Thompson." Thompson later lived with his Conklin kin in the rural community of Parsons in Labette County, Kansas. With no father around, Donald Thompson was sent to live with a more settled family and as a teenager he primarily lived with his uncle Cory E. Conklin and aunt in Chanute, Kansas. Poet Esther M. Clark was his neighbor in those days and published an article in the local newspaper (Coffeyville Journal of May, 18, 1918), debunking Thompson's self-promoted background from Topeka. By 1900, Thompson and his mother had moved to Topeka. Thompson was raised by his mother and maternal grandparents and never had a father present in his life. His mother divorced Thomas Thompson in 1914 after claiming he had deserted her 20 years earlier.

Thompson dabbled as a freelance photographer for the Topeka Daily Capital and made some notes and took some photos of the Kansas River flooding in 1903.

He was arrested in 1909 for presuming to be an officer of the US Army and referred to as "one of the smoothest swindlers in the country." After serving two years in Leavenworth, he was released and then immediately re-arrested and brought to Washington D.C. Owing to his good conduct while in prison, he was granted parole.

By late 1911, he began working as a correspondent for The Washington Herald and covered the 1912 Democratic Convention in Baltimore and the Colorado Coalfield War.

== War in Europe ==
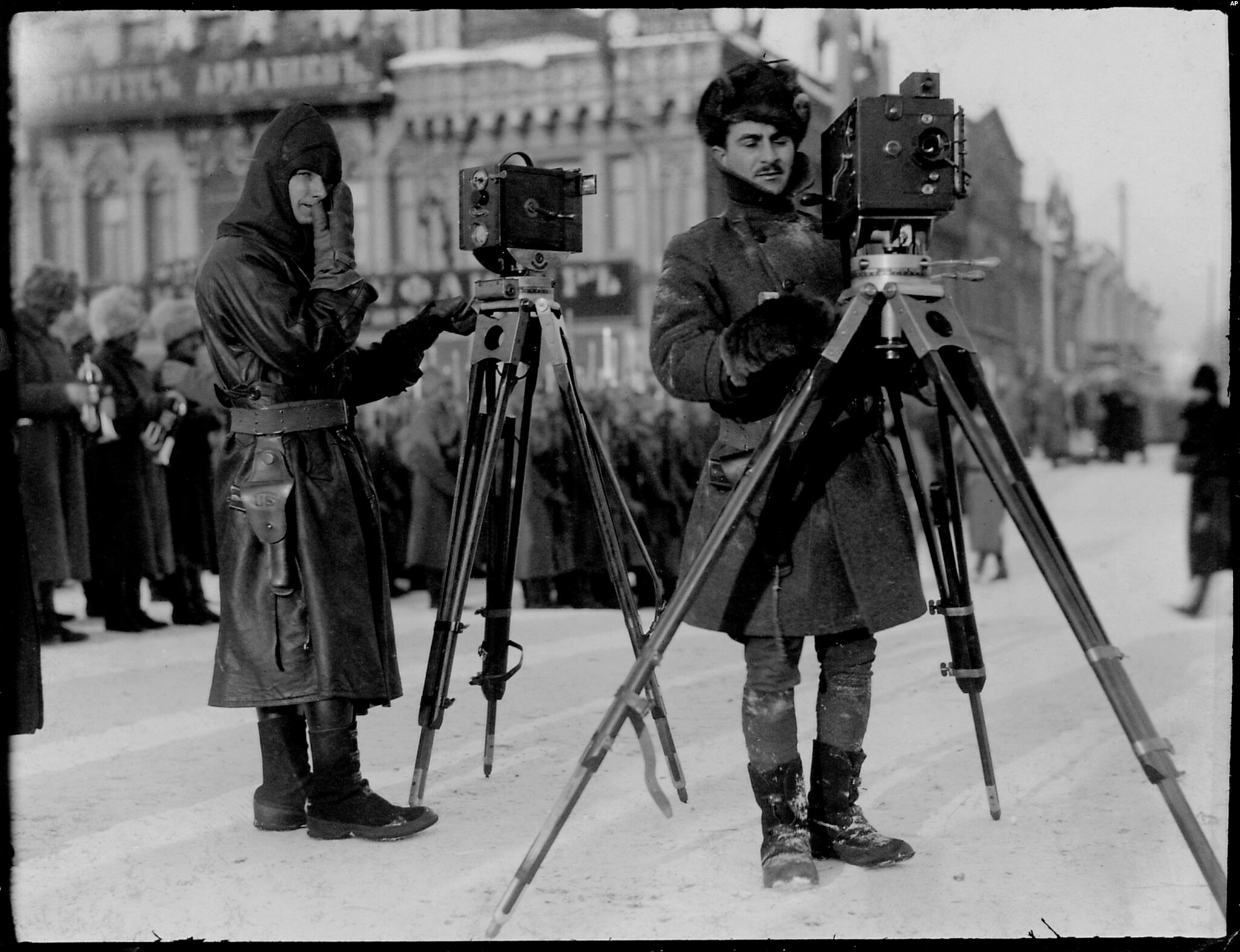
Donald C. Thompson (left) taking moving pictures in Yekaterinburg in eastern Russia in subzero temperatures c. 1919

When World War 1 broke out in Europe, Thompson was commissioned by the Montreal newspaper, Cartier Centenary, to film Canadian troops. During the first year of the war, Thompson shot stills for American and British newspapers and magazines such as the New York World, the Chicago Tribune, Leslie’s Illustrated Weekly, the London Daily Mail, and the Illustrated London News. He also shot film for the major newsreel companies. He was arrested nine times while attempting to reach the front from Paris. Each time he was taken before a military tribunal. Utterly ignoring the subordinate officers, he would demand to see the commanding officer. He would grasp that astonished official by the hand and nearly wring it off, meanwhile inquiring solicitously after the General’s health and that of his family. On this 10th attempted, he explained to the French officer who had arrested him that he was in search of his wife and daughter, who were dying somewhere on the Belgian frontier. The officer was so affected by the pathos of the story that he wept on Thompson’s neck and sent him forward in a Red Cross automobile. So he succeeded and photographed the Battle of Mons.

He was wounded while dining with Germans in Diksmuide. When asked how many languages he spoke, he answered: ″Three, English, American, and Yankee.″

Thompson made his first trip to the Russian Empire in 1915. Thompson’s footage was released by the Chicago Tribune as a feature-length film, With the Russians at the Front, in August 1915.

Lecture by Cooper C. Graham on World War I cameraman Donald C. Thompson

While in the Russian Empire, Thompson met Czar Nicholas II who commissioned Thompson as a captain in the Czar's Cossack regiment so he could more easily take photos in Russia.

Thompson was able to move about on instinct, being able to access the battlefield regardless of the British, the French and the Germans. He often lied about his identity, a useful tactic that also got him into trouble whether at war or peace. He found being a photographer exciting work, and it appears he thoroughly enjoyed the deception he often used to film the scenes he wanted to capture.

In 1916, he joined the French army as an official cinematographer. He filmed at the siege of Verdun and Battle of the Somme, where he was wounded. His second feature, War As It Really Is was released in December 1916. Its premiere at the Rialto Theater in New York City broke the box office record.

In late 1916, Leslie’s Weekly sent Thompson and journalist Florence Harper to Petrograd to cover the Eastern front. Shortly after their arrival, the March Revolution broke out. Thompson and Harper had a unique opportunity to witness the disintegration of Russia into chaos from February until August 1917. Thompson returned to the United States in September 1917 and in December he released his feature-length film, The German Curse in Russia (also known as Blood-Stained Russia). It was released to enthusiastic reviews in December 1917.

"The German Curse in Russia"(USA, 1918)/ Reconstruction

Thompson and his wife returned to Russia in 1918 or 1919 and photographed the activities of the American Red Cross during the Allied intervention in the Russian Civil War.

Various segments from Thompson's World War 1 footage have been found by authors Ron van Dopperen and Cooper C. Graham while researching their book American Cinematographers in the Great War, 1914-1918.

== Post-war ==
Throughout the 1920s and 1930s, Thompson worked as a freelancer, selling topical films and travelogues in many places such as Mongolia, Borneo, China and the Philippines.

Thompson and his wife, Dorothy, joined writer and adventurer Gertrude Emerson on a world journey in 1920. At the time, Emerson was associate editor of Asia an American magazine that featured reporting about Asia and its people.

Thompson was arrested in Chicago in 1923 for impersonating naval officers and passing worthless checks. The case was eventually dropped on the grounds of mistaken identity.

In 1924, Thompson traveled to Hawaii to film the Kīlauea volcano. He successfully filmed the volcano but his film was destroyed in a fire a few days later. Thompson had several episodes with fire, no doubt caused by spontaneous combustion of the film material.

Thompson filmed the opium trade in Siam in 1927 including a 30-acre opium factory in Bangkok. Siam approved the films after they were censored but ordered him to never show the films. The negatives of the film were stolen at one point and then returned. The positives were mysteriously stolen in 1934.

In 1932, Thompson filmed the Shanghai Incident. Thompson claims that he filmed the Second Italo-Ethiopian War and the Spanish Civil War, but there is no existing evidence to support his claims. He also claimed to have interviewed Adolf Hitler and Benito Mussolini.

Thompson continued to address audiences and share his adventures and world views until at least 1940.

== Personal life ==
Thompson had four or five wives. He had a daughter, Alma, with his first wife, Elizabeth E. Bauer. His second wife, Dorothy Marshall, accompanied him on some of his travels, most notably his trip to Russia in 1918-19 and his trip to Asia July 1920 to May 1921. His third wife, Maria Valine, journeyed with him on a few of his assignments in the later 1920s. He was living with his fourth wife, Jennie O. Johnstun, in the 1940s in Hollywood but it appears they were divorced at the time of Thompson's death. His death certificate indicates he is divorced but then lists his wife as Mariel Thompson.

Thompson moved to southern California by 1930 and died of heart failure at Rancho Los Amigos Hospital in Hondo, California, on July 8, 1947. He was cremated at Los Angeles County Crematory.

== Works ==
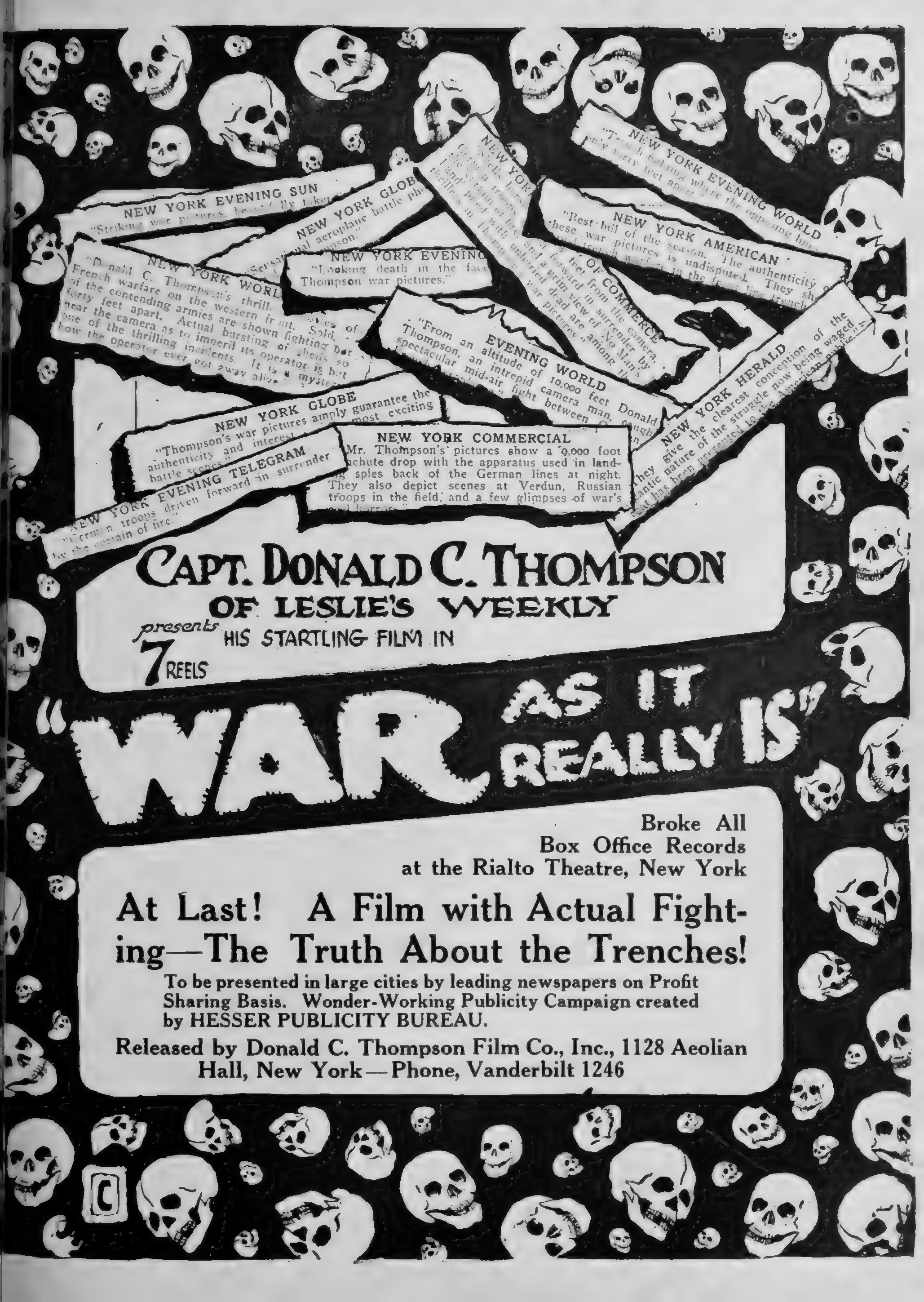
Advertisement in The Moving Picture World for War As It Really Is, 23 December 1916

=== Photo books ===
From Czar to Kaiser, The Betrayal of Russia (1918) (also titled Blood Stained Russia and The Crime of the Twentieth Century)

Donald Thompson In Russia (1918)

The ‘Sino-Japanese disturbances.’ Souvenir album (1932)

=== Films ===
With the Russians at the Front (December 1915) - shot while on first trip to Russia with Robert R. McCormick of the Chicago Tribune

Somewhere in France (1915) - shot on the Western Front

Fighting the War (USA, 1916) - Two-reel production by Thompson released by the Mutual Film Corporation.

War As It Really Is (1916)

The German Curse in Russia (1918)– reconstruction, 2017
