= Basiswar Sen =

Indian agricultural scientist

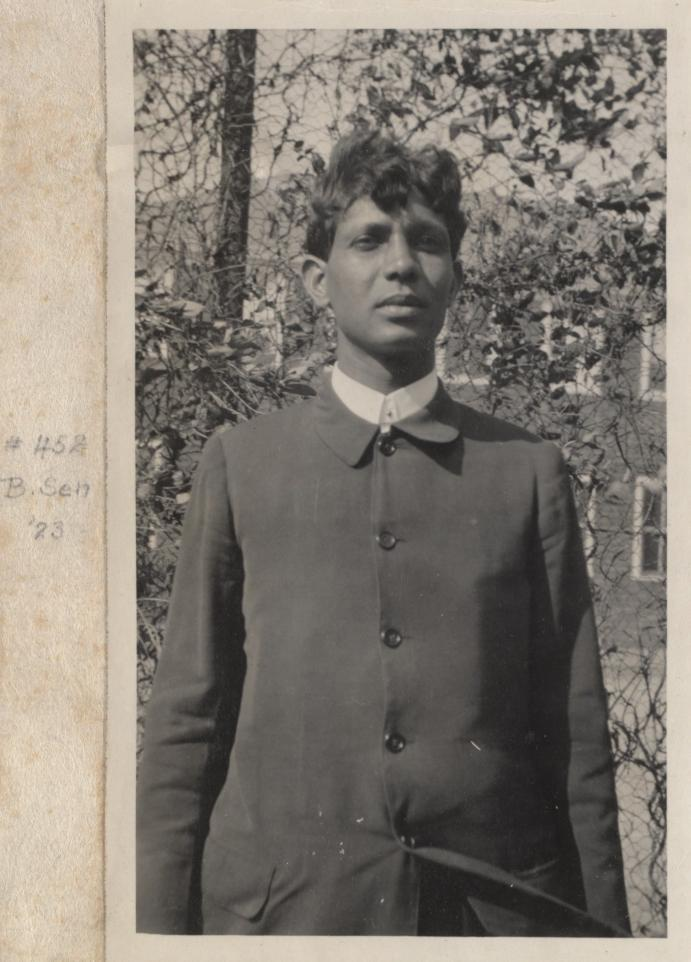
Basiswar Sen, c. 1923

Basiswar "Boshi" Sen (1887 – 31 August 1971) was an Indian agricultural scientist. He was a pioneer of the Green Revolution movement that changed the food landscape of India by growing abundant food grains, thereby reducing the possibility of any famine in the country. His wife was Gertrude Emerson Sen, an American author and specialist on Asia. He founded the Vivekananda Laboratory in the Almora region of the Himalayas. He was a friend of many notable people, such as Indian Prime minister Jawaharlal Nehru, poet Rabindranath Tagore, Julian Huxley, and D. H. Lawrence. Sen was also associated with the Ramakrishna Order and the Ramakrishna Vivekananda movement, as well as with Jagadish Chandra Bose, the Indian scientist, and Sister Nivedita, the writer, orator, freedom fighter and direct disciple of Swami Vivekananda. The Government of India awarded him the third-highest civilian honour of Padma Bhushan in 1957.

== Early life ==
Sen was born in Bishnupur area in Bengal in 1887. His father's name was Rameswar Sen, who was the first graduate of Calcutta University from Bankura district of Bengal. His mother's name was Prasannamoyi Devi. Sens elder brother Sureswar Sen was an ardent devotee of the Holy Mother Sri Sarada Devi. Owing to the untimely death of Rameshwar, the Sen family was in financial strain. Sen (or Boshi as he came to be known in his later life), completed his school education by staying with a sister in Ranchi. He passed the BSc examination from St. Xavier's College in Calcutta. He was introduced to Ramakrishna Order by his friend Bibhuti Bhushon Ghosh. Sen was intimately associated with Swami Sadananda, also called Gupta Maharaj, a direct monastic disciple of Swami Vivekananda. Boshi also took a few photographs of the Holy Mother Sri Sarada Devi.

At this time he also came in contact with Sister Nivedita who introduced him to Acharya Jagadish Chandra Bose, the famous Indian scientist, biologist and botanist. Boshi worked with Sir Jagadish Chandra Bose for several years in Bose Institute and even accompanied him to London. In 1923, he travelled to the United States on invitation of an American scientist, Glen Overton. After his return to India, Boshi wanted to do independent research, and he parted from Dr. J.C Bose and founded his own laboratory in a small kitchen in Bosepara Lane, Baghbazar, where he was staying. The laboratory was named after Swami Vivekananda. Boshi met Romain Rolland in 1928 and had a discussion on the lives of Ramakrishna and Vivekananda with him. He met Albert Einstein in 1930 in Berlin and had discussions on Science and Religion.

In 1924 Sister Christine or Christine Greenstidel a direct American disciple of Swami Vivekananda had come down to India and took up her accommodation with Boshi. Boshi relocated to Almora where he set up his laboratory in Kundan House, rented with the money of Josephine MacLeod, and Sister Christine stayed there with him for two years. In 1928 Boshi accompanied Sister Christine to New York to help her recover from a failing health, where she died. In Almora Boshi he met Gertrude Emerson, an explorer, writer and founding member of Society of Woman Geographers. She was a graduate of Chicago University, a fellow of Royal Geographical Society and also editor of the Asia Magazine. In 1932 Boshi and Gertrude were married to each other. She became Gertrude Emerson Sen. They had many diginataries as their acquaintances in Kundan House, the most notable among them being Rabindranath Tagore, the mystic poet and Nobel laureate, Jawaharlal Nehru, Julian Huxley, note danceuse Uday Shankar, Swami Virajananda, the then head of Ramakrishna Order, Carl Jung etc.

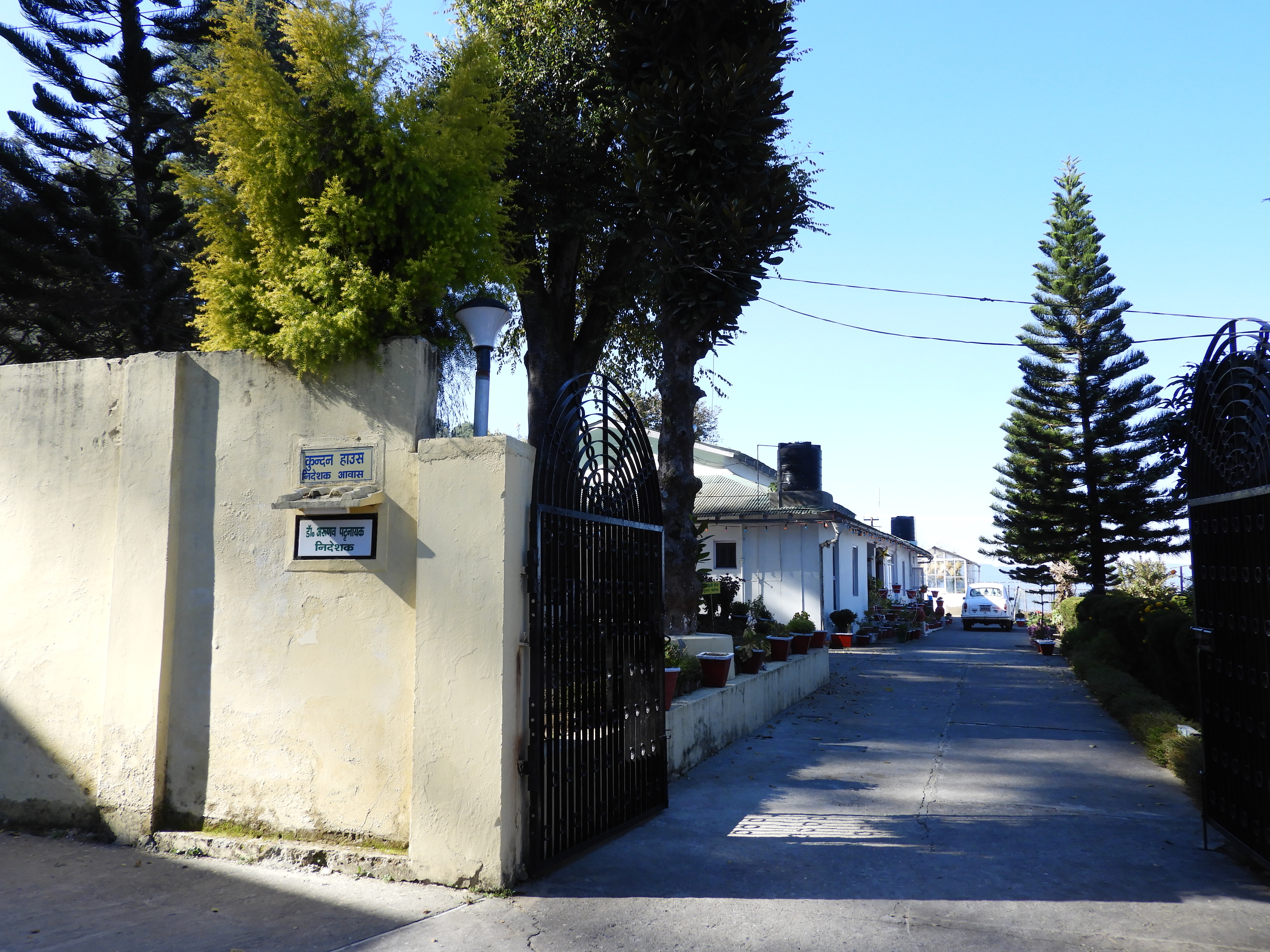
Kundan house, residence of Dr Basiswar Sen

== Scientific research ==
The Great Bengal Famine of 1943 had changed Sen's outlook towards research and from research on plant cell his focus shifted to applied research on agriculture and food grain productivity. In this matter he was deeply influenced by the humanistic endeavours and messages of Swami Vivekananda who identified food problem as one of the major problems plaguing British India. His research in practical and applied agriculture included plant introduction, plant breeding and production of hybrid seeds of maize, jowar, bajra, and onion. He followed the claims of Trofim Lysenko to develop so-called vernalized crop varieties. In his Vivekananda Laboratory, he was successful in production of hybrid maize seeds and hybrid onions. For his pioneering work which heralded Green Revolution in India, he was awarded Padma Bhushan in 1957 and Watmull award in 1962. He was allotted land for the expansion of his work by Uttar Pradesh Government in Hawalbagh. In 1959 his Laboratory was transferred to U. P. Government, and it allotted 215 acre land for scientific research.

== Other activities ==
In 1939, Sen and Gertrude took initiative in setting up Uday Shankar Cultural Centre at Almora. But the centre lasted only for five years. Sen was also deeply spiritual in nature. He was inspired by the monks from Ramakrishna Math. He had nursed Swami Sadananda during his last days and was also initiated by him. Sen was also close to Swami Brahmananda, the first president of the Ramakrishna Mission. He wrote at least one article, titled "Science and Religion".

== Later life ==
Sen died on 31 August 1971 in Ranikhet Military Hospital, Almora. After his death, Vivekananda Laboratory was absorbed into Indian Council of Agricultural Research (ICAR) as an autonomous unit in 1974, and had a leading role to play in resolving the food crisis of India through Green Revolution. It was renamed as Vivekananda Paravatiya Krishi Anisandhan Sanstha.

== Books ==
Nearer Heaven Than Earth: The Life and Times of Boshi Sen and Gertrude Emerson Sen, by Girish N Mehra, ISBN 9788129110923
