= Anniyan (soundtrack) =

2005 soundtrack album by Harris Jayaraj

Soundtrack album by Harris Jayaraj
- Released: 13 May 2005
- Recorded: 2004–2005
- Genre: Film soundtrack
- Length: 31:38
- Language: Tamil
- Label: Sony Music India
- Producer: Harris Jayaraj

Harris Jayaraj chronology
Ullam Ketkumae (2005)	Anniyan (2005)	Ghajini (2005)

Anniyan is the soundtrack album composed by Harris Jayaraj for the 2006 Indian Tamil film of the same name directed by S. Shankar. It eventually marked Harris' maiden collaboration, replacing his usual music director A. R. Rahman, who worked for his previous ventures as Rahman was busy with the production of the international musicals Bombay Dreams and Lord of the Rings. Harris Jayaraj began working on the soundtrack in early 2004 and completed within April 2005. But the re-recording of the soundtrack and score which began on the same month took place for more than 45 days, which resulted in delaying the film's release till 17 June 2006.

The soundtrack album, which consists of five tracks and theme music. is considered to be "a cocktail of genres" as described by Jayaraj. The lyrics for the songs were written by Vairamuthu, Na. Muthukumar and Kabilan. The album featured songs recorded by Nakul, Andrea Jeremiah, Saindhavi and G. V. Prakash Kumar, in their playback singing debut. (Note: G. V. Prakash Kumar earlier sang for Rahman's compositions, beginning with "Chikku Bukku Rayile" from Gentleman (1993). This marked his first stint in playback singing as an adult.) A soft launch for the film's soundtrack was held on 13 May 2005. The album was also dubbed and released in Telugu as Aparichithudu, and in Hindi as Aparichit: The Stranger, a year later. The soundtrack fetched two Filmfare Awards and a Tamil Nadu State Film Award for Best Music Director to Harris Jayaraj, who also received the same award for his work in Ghajini.

== Production ==
Anniyan is Shankar's first collaboration with Harris Jayaraj, since all his previous directorial ventures had A. R. Rahman composing the music. As Rahman was busy with his debut Broadway musical Bombay Dreams and had also signed up for another musical Lord of the Rings, Rahman and Shankar decided to part ways. In early 2004, Harris Jayaraj went on a trip to Phuket Islands in Thailand for some inspiration for the album; where he was accompanied by Shankar and Vairamuthu. Eventually, the three songs penned by the lyricist were composed in the island. The visit took place much before the tragic 2004 tsunami struck the countries bordering the Indian Ocean and wreaked havoc. In a chat with Shankar, Harris Jayaraj said "the music was a challenge because the film was a mix of genres – action, comedy, thriller. In essence, it was a cock-mocktail". Harris Jayaraj commenced the film's re-recording in April 2005 and took more than a month to complete, delaying the film's release.

== Composition ==
The soundtrack album has five songs tuned by Harris Jayaraj apart from a theme music. The album marks the playback singing debut of Nakul, Andrea Jeremiah and Saindhavi. The first song to be composed was "Kumari", a semi-classical folk melody sung by Shankar Mahadevan and Harini. "Iyengaaru Veetu Azhage", written by Vairamuthu is a pure carnatic song sung by Hariharan and Harini. The track begins with "Jagadananda Karaka", one of the Pancharatna Kritis by Saint Tyagaraja. "Kadhal Yaanai", a peppy club song, was sung by G. V. Prakash Kumar and Nakul. G. V. Prakash, who would later turn a composer, was working as a keyboard programmer for Jayaraj when Shankar noticed him and made him sing. While Kumar had already sung a few songs as a kid under Rahman (his maternal uncle), this was his first song as an adult. Again, it was Shankar who recommended using Nakul's voice to Jayaraj. Nakul had earlier sung for the backing vocals of Shankar's Boys which also marked his acting debut. Na. Muthukumar's lyrics for the song predominantly contains Tanglish words interspersed among Tamil words.

The music of "Andangkaka", an aesthetic folk number, took three days to compose while the singers rehearsed for another five days to get the words right. The lyrics by Vairamuthu is written in pure Tamil in a dialect spoken in the region surrounding Theni and Madurai districts of Tamil Nadu. The song was rendered by Jassie Gift, Shreya Ghoshal and Saindhavi. The song "Lajjavathiye" from the soundtrack of the Malayalam film 4 the People (2004) was composed and sung by Gift; it was a viral hit in Kerala. Jayaraj was impressed with him and made him sing, making it his first song in a Tamil film. The song also happens to be Saindhavi's maiden attempt at playback singing.

== Music video ==
The songs were choreographed by Raju Sundaram, Kalyan and Ahmed Khan. The semi-classical song "Kumari" was the first of the scenes to be shot. Filmed at the World Flower Show in May 2004, the sequence was picturised in a large tulip garden located in the city of Vijfhuizen near Amsterdam, Netherlands. The song was shot during the Netherlands International Flower Show called Floriade, a decennial event which was held between 10 April and 20 October 2004. While the crew had planned to film another song at a garden in Keukenhof, they were denied permission by the authorities as a previous Indian film crew had damaged the habitat a few weeks before. (Note: However, according to Aparna Karthikeyan of The Hindu and a 2011 report by Sify, the song was shot in the tulip gardens of Keukenhof.) The song featured the lead pair singing amidst a flower farm and was accompanied by mridangam and flute players in the background. (Note: Written as per sources. In the song however, the accompanying instruments include one each of a mridangam, harmonium, shruti box and kanjira.) It was choreographed by Raju Sundaram who also appears in a cameo, playing a harmonium. As part of their roles, the male supporting artists appearing in the song were required to wear a panjakkacham and angavastram, leaving most of their body exposed to the freezing cold with the song being shot as early at 5:30 am.

"Iyengaru Veetu", a semi-classical song, begins with a prelude of the Pancharatna Kriti "Jagadānanda kārakā". The actual song which follows later was picturised on a set erected at AVM Studios made to look like an old traditional Iyengar home in Thanjavur. The song was shot extravagantly with the lead pair and the dozens of support dancers sporting rich, colourful costumes. In December 2004, a ten-day shoot was held in Mumbai for the item number "Kadhal Yaanai" featuring Vikram alongside a top model, whose identity was initially undisclosed to generate curiosity. It was later revealed to be Czech-based model Yana Gupta. Filmed by Ravi Varman and choreographed by Ahmed Khan, the song was filmed like a fashion show where Vikram and Yana Gupta wear fashionable clothes and sashay along a ramp. The song was filmed in a set erected in a studio to resemble a famous night-spot in London.

The track "Kannum Kannum Nokia", a peppy and trendy love duet choreographed by Raju Sundaram, was picturised on the lead pair and had them wearing costumes made entirely of designer labels. The song was picturised in Malaysia at the Kuala Lumpur International Airport and Petronas Towers. Filmed during the night, it was reportedly the first song to be shot at the airport. Ravi Varman revealed in an interview that the song was shot like a commercial. It was also filmed at the Nokia Headquarters in Espoo, Finland. The folk song "Andangkaaka" was shot in a village near Sengottai. For filming the song, a huge set was erected to resemble a village. The sets were visualised and created by Sabu Cyril, the film's art director. Shankar adopted a village near Tenkasi and Sabu Cyril painted all the houses, roads, rocks and even a bridge in varied colours. They then hired hundreds of lorries and old model Ambassador cars and painted faces on them. The lead pair were joined by hundreds of dancers and the total cost of the song worked out to ₹10 million. In all, 350 houses were painted.

== Track listing ==
=== Tamil ===
Anniyan
No.	Title	Lyrics	Singer(s)	Length
1.	"Kannum Kannum Nokia"	Kabilan	Lesle Lewis, Andrea Jeremiah, Vasundhara Das, Ranjith	5:25
2.	"Iyengaaru Veetu"	Vairamuthu	Hariharan, Harini	6:10
3.	"Kadhal Yaanai"	Na. Muthukumar	Nakul, Melwyn Peris, G. V. Prakash Kumar	5:48
4.	"O Sukumari"	Vairamuthu	Shankar Mahadevan, Harini	5:56
5.	"Andangkaka"	Vairamuthu	Jassie Gift, K K, Shreya Ghoshal, Saindhavi	5:35
6.	"Stranger in Black (Theme)"	Febi, Nina	Sunitha Sarathy, Chennai Chorale	2:44
Total length:				31:38

=== Hindi ===
All lyrics are written by Mehboob.

Aparichit: The Stranger
No.	Title	Singer(s)	Length
1.	"Gora Gora Aankh"	Lesle Lewis, Vasundhara Das	5:25
2.	"Iyengaru Ghar Ki"	Hariharan, Harini	6:10
3.	"Remo"	Nakul, G. V. Prakash Kumar	5:48
4.	"Kumari"	Unni Krishnan, Harini	5:56
5.	"Chori Hai"	K K, Shreya Ghoshal	5:35
6.	"Stranger in Black (Theme)"	Sunitha Sarathy, Chennai Chorale	2:44
Total length:			31:42

=== Telugu ===
Aparichitudu
No.	Title	Lyrics	Singer(s)	Length
1.	"Naaku Neeku"	Bhuvanachandra	Kunal Ganjawala, Vasundhara Das	5:25
2.	"Jiyangaari Inti"	Chandrabose	K. J. Yesudas, Harini	6:14
3.	"Love Elephantla"	Chandrabose	Nakul, G. V. Prakash Kumar, Tippu	5:46
4.	"O Sukumari"	Bhuvanachandra	Shankar Mahadevan, Harini	5:56
5.	"Konda Kaki"	Bhuvanachandra	Jassie Gift, K K, Sujatha Mohan	5:37
6.	"Stranger in Black (Theme)"	Febi, Nina	Sunitha Sarathy, Chennai Chorale	2:44
Total length:				31:42

== Release ==
The soundtrack album which was distributed by Star Music and AnAK audio, was released at a soft launch held on 13 May 2005 in Chennai. Later, the soundtrack for the Telugu dubbed version titled Aparachithudu was distributed by Aditya Music and released on 3 June 2005. Following, the success of the Tamil and Telugu versions, the makers planned to dub and release the film in Hindi as Aparichit: The Stranger and its soundtrack was released on 17 April 2006 by Venus Music.

== Reception ==
The music was received well by the audience and the tracks "Kadhal Yaanai" and "Kannum Kannum" topped the charts. T. Krithika Reddy of The Hindu remarked, "Harris has steered clear of dreary conventions in music making. Anniyan too proves his relentless quest for freshness." Sreedhar Pillai of The Hindu said that the audio was impressive, with a combination of peppy songs and semi-classical numbers that will appeal to all. Another music critic pointed out that songs in Shankar's films become a rage only after the release of the films, as his lavish picturisation enriches the music. Comparing the music with those of Rahman's in Shankar's previous films, Krishnakumar of Rediff.com said, "Jayaraj doesn't disappoint, but while ARR wafted and lingered, Jayaraj explodes and fizzles away. Kumaari and Iyengar veetu azhage try to seep into your head and Randakka tempts you to tap your feet. But only momentarily. [...] you won't recollect them once the songs are over." A reviewer from Indiaglitz called that the album "has both flavor and fervor". In contrast, Deepak Lakshmanan of Behindwoods termed tracks are termed as "passable" except "Iyengaaru Veetu", and claimed that "Keeping in mind with the film's music only had limited scope contrasting with the film's nature, Jayaraj managed to put his best efforts. But this cannot be termed Shankar's or Jayaraj's best film in terms of music".

== Accolades ==
Award	Category	Recipients	Result	Ref.
53rd Filmfare Awards South	Best Music Director	Harris Jayaraj	Won	
53rd Filmfare Awards South	Best Lyricist	Vairamuthu	Won	
Tamil Nadu State Film Awards (2005)	Best Music Director	Harris Jayaraj	Won (also for Ghajini)	

== Personnel ==
Credits adapted from CD liner notes

- Backing vocals: Chandran, Timmy, David Pascal, Ranjith, Sam, Jack Smelly, Leslie, Sudheer, Febi Mani, Feji, Shalini Singh, Madhumitha, Srividya, Krithika, Suchitra, Flemenco
- English & Latin lyrics: Febi, Nina
- Guitar: Neil Mukherjee
- Acoustic guitar: Kabuli
- Electric guitar: Kabuli, Gourav
- Bass guitar: Keith Peters
- Dobro: Kabuli
- Flute: Nathan
- Sax: Raju
- Harp: Seenu
- Solo violin: Kalyan
- Kollu Vadhyam: Durga Prasad
- Ghatam: Karthick
- Live drums & percussions: Kumar
- Indian percussions: Lakshmi Narayanan, Raju, Thumbaa, Kaviraj, Vedha
- Mridhangam: Mohanram
- Ganjeera: K. V. Balu
- Strings: Chennai Strings Orchestra (conducted by Kabuli & Shankar)
- Recorded at: Trinity Audio Studios
- Sound engineers: A. J. Daniel, R. Girish
- Mixed and mastered by: A. S. Laxmi Narayanan

== Bibliography ==
- Rangan, Baradwaj (2014). "Directors: Shankar". Dispatches from the Wall Corner : A Journey through Indian Cinema. Tranquebar Press, Westland Ltd. ISBN 978-93-84030-56-8.
