= War As It Really Is =

Documentary war film by Donald C. Thompson released in 1916

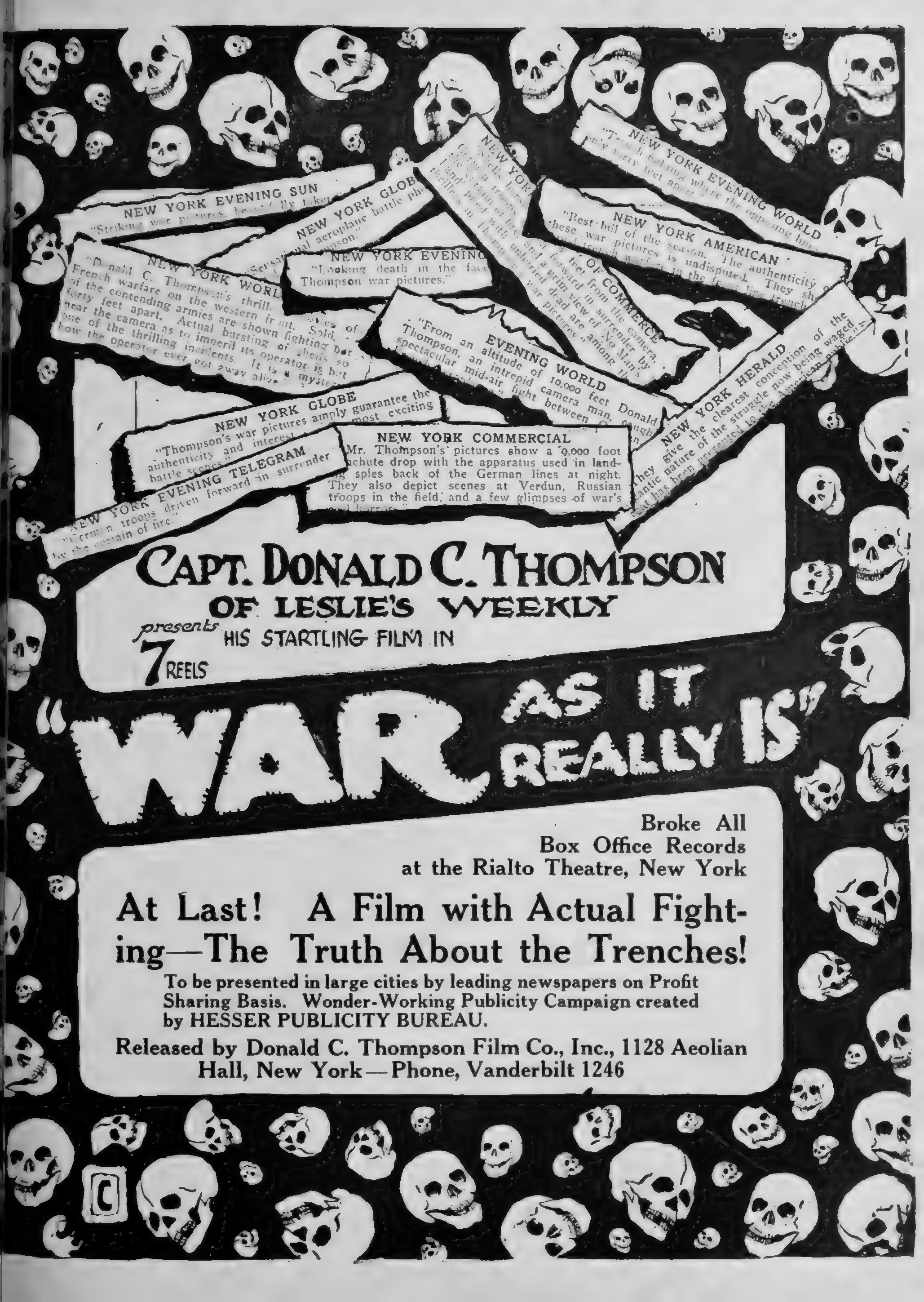
- Motion Picture News advertisement for the film, 23 December 1916
- Cinematography: Donald C. Thompson
- Edited by: Donald C. Thompson
- Distributed by: Donald C. Thompson Film Co., Inc.
- Release date: 15 October 1916
- Running time: 116 minutes
- Country: United States
- Languages: Silent film English intertitles

War As It Really Is is a 1916 American documentary war film shot, edited and distributed by Donald C. Thompson. The seven-reel film exposed American audiences to some of the most authentic sights and first-hand accounts of World War I before the United States entered the war. The film was first shown in installments at the Rialto Theatre in New York City in October 1916.

Thompson was aware of the disparity between the dramatic images of war the Hollywood studios were putting out at the time and the unglamorous war he had personally experienced and filmed. This was implicit in the ironic title of the film.

== Content ==
Reel 1. Thompson removes a French helmet and eye protection. Exchange of telegrams between Thompson and Leslie's Weekly. Aerial views of the harbor at Salonica, Greece; French and British destroyers in the harbor; a seaplane taxiing, taking off, and landing; and an observation balloon being raised and lowered from a ship in the harbor.

Reel 2. Buildings in rubble and defenses at Verdun; wounded French soldiers; corpses; German prisoners in a stockade. The Somme offensive; French President Raymond Poincaré and General Joseph Joffre decorating and reviewing French and Russian troops. General Paul Pau reviews troops and decorates a unit flag.

Reel 3. French observation balloon ascends and an observer parachutes from it. French airplanes take off, engage in dogfights with German planes, and land.

Reel 4. Ammunition and supply trucks, armored cars, and oxen-drawn artillery advance along country roads. Supplies are moved forward by rail. Railroad guns are loaded and fired. Ammunition is stacked at dumps.

Reel 5. Gunboats move along the Yser and fire barrages. Artillery pieces loaded and fired. Effects of the shell fire; artillery observation posts; German observation balloons; and gas being fanned from a trench.

Reel 6. Scottish infantry passes through Mametz, Somme. Telephone wire is strung. Troops throw grenades. Prisoners are marched to the rear. Joffre confers with aides. Tunnels are made under German trenches with air drills, mines are planted, and the trenches exploded. A spy is shot. Machine guns are moved forward. Skeletons lie beside a burial trench. Hand grenades explode in German trenches. Troops charge German trenches.

Reel 7. Infantry attack and go over top of trench; Germans surrender and shout "Kamerad!" and are marched through French trenches to a stockade in the rear and searched; French infantry advances through No-Mans Land; abandoned German war materiel; mutilated corpses; German prisoners marched to the rear; and French and U.S. flags.

== Production ==
=== Photography ===
Thompson most probably captured the Salonica material and the dogfights during his trip to the Balkans and France in November and December 1915. Other reels of film are largely sourced from material he shot in June and July 1916 in France. Thompson claims to have shot 30 reels of film, primarily for Leslie's Weekly, but 70% of his material remained in France. He was commissioned by the French Government to record the French offensive at Verdun. Thompson's hopes of covering the Allied offensive of 1916 were dashed when he was wounded in France on July 2 at the Battle of the Somme. Nevertheless, he had enough footage for a 10-reel feature, which he edited down to seven reels for public release. He edited the footage while convalescing in New York.

=== Release ===
Thompson created a company named Donald C. Thompson Film Co., Inc. to market and distribute the film. The company was formed largely of his associates at Leslie Weekly.

Thompson initially offered the exclusive rights of the film to Samuel Rothafel, managing director of the Rialto Theatre in New York City. Rothafel began screening the film in installments on October 15, 1916 and claimed that the film broke the Rialto's box office records. The film was widely circulated in northeastern US and in Canada and by August 1917 in Australia.

Thompson often showed the film to raise money and offered the film free of charge to any organization that would donate proceeds from its exhibition to the American Red Cross.

The Army and Navy War College in Washington DC bought prints of the film to use in an official capacity for study and observation. Officers were amazed at the detail in the film, such as the manufacture and piping of poison gas, the sappers digging mines under the enemy trenches by the aid of compressed air, how the ammunition is fed to the big 15-inch guns and their method of firing, the armored canal boats bringing up supplies in back of the lines, and the organization and working of the spy system.

=== Reception ===
"To secure motion pictures of actual fighting in the European conflict requires a of mixture of skill, courage, the official influence and knowledge of military affairs. All these qualities are combined in the person of Donald C. Thompson, staff photographer for Leslie's Weekly and official cinematographer to the French Government. For that reason his collection of films stands in a class apart from the mass of stuff which has been exhibited in this country in the guise of "war pictures" and which has been in so many cases either utterly spurious or taken so far from the actual front line of battle as to be of little more than academic interest." The Moving Picture World, November 4, 1916

"The most impressive feature of Mr. Thompson's pictures is their authenticity. Nothing is faked. The photographer was under fire repeatedly, and scene after scene was taken at the risk of his life. ...the man who made the pictures never let any obstacle or danger stand in his way." The Moving Picture World, November 11, 1916

"Thompson is an artist as well as a photographer, a cool headed, daring photographer at that. Some of the pictures he has taken of the great war would size up favorably with the work of the great masters, and give a wealth of detail not found in these. One can sit thru the entire seven reels and not lose interest ... Besides their historical interest and the strong, bold portrayal of actual soldier life as it is today, the pictures have a number of unique features. Men, men, men by the thousands stream across the screen, young men, old men, uniformed men, ragged men, strong men and weak – French, Scots, English, Russian, Austrian, Algerian – men about to die and men already dead, but never a woman in the entire picture." The Topeka Daily Capital, December 9, 1916

"Decidedly pro-Ally as the material is, it shows interesting effects of the German sweep through the war zone. Massed bodies of French and English troops en route; piled stores of shells; slumbering cannon, aero craft, and German prisoners; views from aloft of trenches as well as of battleships all go toward packing the seven reels with interest. Much detail is clearly screened in the corpses and skeletons piled about deserted fortifications. The very fine photography and immense expanse of territory covered at a sweep of the camera lense, bring this collection of front-line-of-battle pictures up to any war films yet seen on this side, as far as merit goes. Their value at box offices depends as ever-upon the state of the public appetite for such pictures." Steve Talbot, Motion Picture News, December 23, 1916

=== Preservation ===
A print of the movie has survived in the Records of the Office of the Chief Signal Officer of the National Archives in Washington, DC.
