= M. S. Swaminathan =

Indian agronomist (1925–2023)

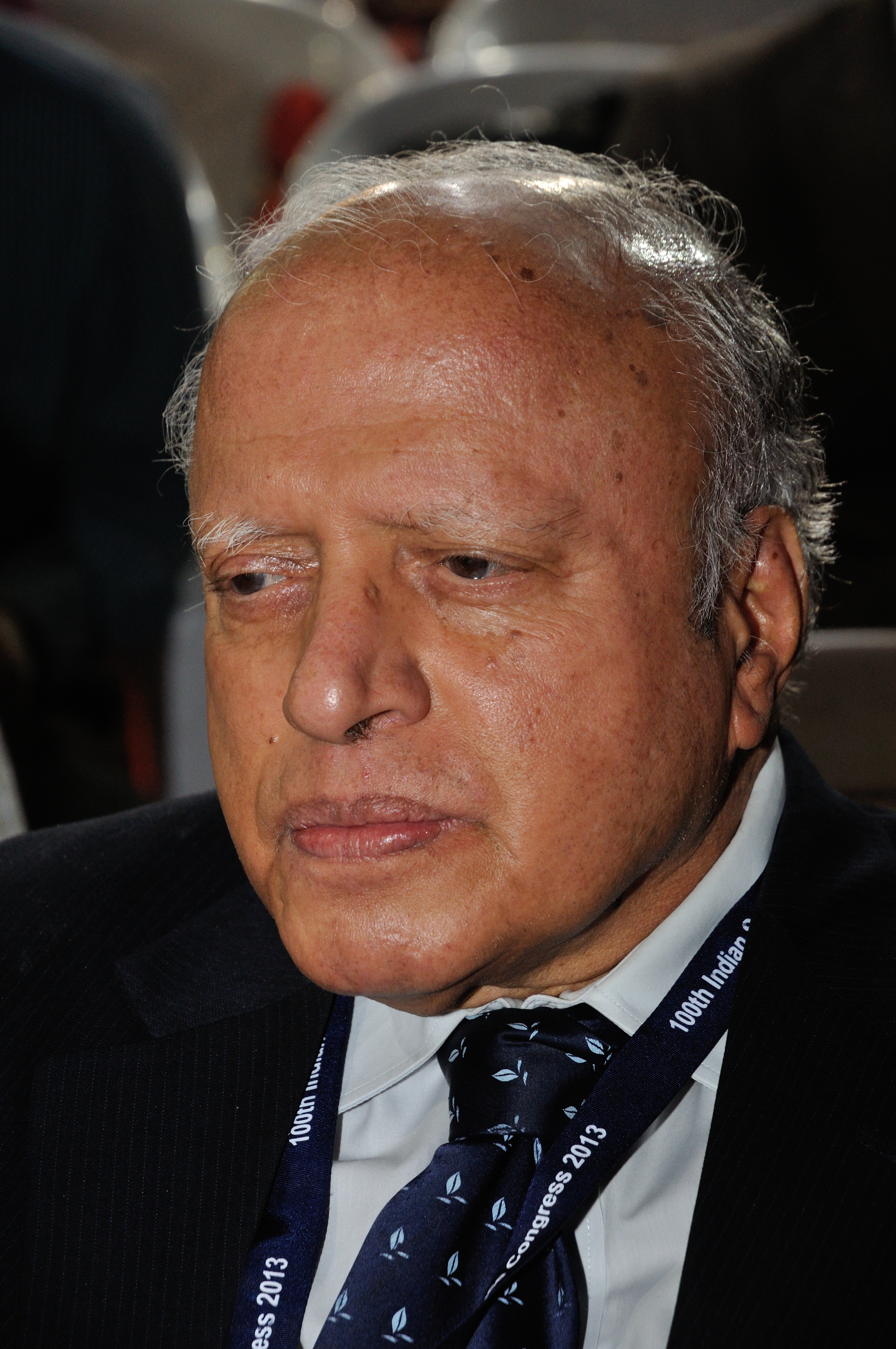
- Swaminathan in 2013

Member of Parliament, Rajya Sabha
- In office 2007–2013
- Constituency: Nominated

Principal Secretary in the Ministry of Agriculture and Irrigation
- In office 1979–1980

Personal details
- Born: Mankombu Sambasivan Swaminathan; 7 August 1925 Kumbakonam, Tanjore District, Madras Presidency, British India (present-day Thanjavur, Tamil Nadu, India)
- Died: 28 September 2023 (aged 98) Chennai, Tamil Nadu, India
- Education: University of Kerala (BSc); University of Madras (MSc); University of Cambridge (PhD)
- Scientific career
- Spouse: Mina Swaminathan (m. 1955; died 2022)
- Children: 3, including Soumya
- Awards: Padma Shri (1967); Ramon Magsaysay Award (1971); Padma Bhushan (1972); World Food Prize (1987); Padma Vibhushan (1989); Bharat Ratna (2024)
- Fields: Botany; plant genetics; genetics; cytogenetics; ecological economics; plant breeding; ecotechnology
- Workplaces: Indian Agricultural Research Institute (IARI; as teacher, researcher and research administrator, 1954–1972); Indian Council of Agricultural Research (ICAR; as Director General, 1972–1980); International Rice Research Institute (IRRI; as Director General, 1982–1988)
- Thesis: Species Differentiation, and the Nature of Polyploidy in certain species of the genus Solanum–section Tuberarium (1952)
- Doctoral advisor: H. W. Howard

Mankombu Sambasivan Swaminathan (7 August 1925 – 28 September 2023) was an Indian geneticist and plant breeder, administrator and humanitarian who was a global leader of the green revolution. He has been called the main architect (Note: A number of people have been recognized for their efforts during India's Green Revolution. Chidambaram Subramaniam, the food and agriculture minister at the time, a Bharat Ratna, has been called the Political Father of the Green Revolution. Dilbagh Singh Athwal is called the Father of Green Revolution.) of the green revolution in India for his leadership and role in introducing and further developing high-yielding varieties of wheat and rice.

Swaminathan's collaborative scientific efforts with Norman Borlaug, spearheading a mass movement with farmers and other scientists and backed by public policies, saved India and Pakistan from certain famine-like conditions in the 1960s. His leadership as director general of the International Rice Research Institute (IRRI) in the Philippines was instrumental in his being awarded the first World Food Prize in 1987, recognized as one of the highest honours in the field of agriculture. The United Nations Environment Programme has called him "the Father of Economic Ecology". He was recently conferred the Bharat Ratna, the highest civilian award of the Republic of India, in 2024.

Swaminathan contributed basic research related to potato, wheat, and rice, in areas such as cytogenetics, ionizing radiation, and radiosensitivity. He was a president of the Pugwash Conferences and the International Union for Conservation of Nature. In 1999, he was one of three Indians, along with Gandhi and Tagore, on Time's list of the 20 most influential Asian people of the 20th century. Swaminathan received numerous awards and honours, including the Shanti Swarup Bhatnagar Award, the Ramon Magsaysay Award, and the Albert Einstein World Science Award. Swaminathan chaired the National Commission on Farmers in 2004, which recommended far-reaching ways to improve India's farming system. He was the founder of an eponymous research foundation. He coined the term "Evergreen Revolution" in 1990 to describe his vision of "productivity in perpetuity without associated ecological harm". He was nominated to the Parliament of India for one term between 2007 and 2013. During his tenure he put forward a bill for the recognition of women farmers in India.

== Life ==
=== Early life and education ===
Swaminathan was born in a Tamil Brahmin family in Kumbakonam, Madras Presidency, on 7 August 1925. He was the second son of general surgeon M. K. Sambasivan and Parvati Thangammal Sambasivan. At age 11, after his father's death, Swaminathan was looked after by his father's brother. Swaminathan’s parents were second-generation descendants of migrants from Thanjavur, and were natives of Mankombu, Alappuzha, Kerala. This was the reason he was carrying Mankombu in his name.

Swaminathan was educated at a local high school and later at the Catholic Little Flower High School in Kumbakonam, from which he matriculated at age 15. From childhood, he interacted with farming and farmers; his extended family grew rice, mangoes, and coconut, and later expanded into other areas such as coffee. He saw the impact that fluctuations in the price of crops had on his family, including the devastation that weather and pests could cause to crops as well as incomes.

His parents wanted him to study medicine. With that in mind, he started off his higher education with zoology. But when he witnessed the impacts of the Bengal famine of 1943 during the Second World War and shortages of rice throughout the sub-continent, he decided to devote his life to ensuring India had enough food. Despite his family background, and belonging to an era where medicine and engineering were considered much more prestigious, he chose agriculture.

He went on to finish his undergraduate degree in zoology at Maharaja's College in Trivandrum, Kerala (now known as University College, Thiruvananthapuram at the University of Kerala). He then studied at University of Madras (Madras Agricultural College, now the Tamil Nadu Agricultural University) from 1940 to 1944 and earned a Bachelor of Science degree in Agricultural Science. During this time he was also taught by Cotah Ramaswami, a professor of agronomy.

In 1947 he moved to the Indian Agricultural Research Institute (IARI) in New Delhi to study genetics and plant breeding. He obtained a post-graduate degree with high distinction in cytogenetics in 1949. His research focused on the genus Solanum, with specific attention to the potato. Social pressures resulted in him competing in the examinations for civil services, through which he was selected to the Indian Police Service. At the same time, an opportunity for him arose in the agriculture field in the form of a UNESCO fellowship in genetics in the Netherlands. He chose genetics.

=== Netherlands and Europe ===
Swaminathan was a UNESCO fellow at the Wageningen Agricultural University's Institute of Genetics in the Netherlands for eight months. The demand for potatoes during the Second World War resulted in deviations in age-old crop rotations. This caused golden nematode infestations in certain areas such as reclaimed agricultural lands. Swaminathan worked on adapting genes to provide resilience against such parasites, as well as cold weather. To this effect, the research succeeded. Ideologically the university influenced his later scientific pursuits in India with respect to food production. During this time he also made a visit to the Max Planck Institute for Plant Breeding Research in war-torn Germany; this would later influence him deeply as during his next visit, a decade later, he saw that the Germans had transformed Germany, both infrastructurally and energetically.

=== United Kingdom ===
In 1950, he moved to study at the Plant Breeding Institute of the University of Cambridge School of Agriculture. He earned a Doctor of Philosophy degree in 1952 for his thesis "Species Differentiation, and the Nature of Polyploidy in certain species of the genus Solanum – section Tuberarium". The following December he stayed for a week with F.L. Brayne, a former Indian Civil Service officer, whose experiences with rural India influenced Swaminathan in his later years.

=== United States of America ===
Swaminathan then spent 15 months in the United States. He accepted a post-doctoral research associateship at the University of Wisconsin's Laboratory of Genetics to help set up a USDA potato research station. The laboratory at the time had Nobel laureate Joshua Lederberg on its faculty. His associateship ended in December 1953. Swaminathan turned down a faculty position in order to continue to make a difference back home in India.

=== India ===
Swaminathan returned to India in early 1954. There were no jobs in his specialisation and it was only three months later that he received an opportunity through a former professor to work temporarily as an assistant botanist at Central Rice Research Institute in Cuttack. At Cuttack, he was under an indica-japonica rice hybridisation program started by Krishnaswami Ramiah. This stint would go on to influence his future work with wheat. Half a year later he joined Indian Agricultural Research Institute (IARI) in New Delhi in October 1954 as an assistant cytogeneticist. Swaminathan was critical of India importing food grains when seventy percent of India was dependent on agriculture. Further drought and famine-like situations were developing in the country.

Swaminathan and Norman Borlaug collaborated, with Borlaug touring India and sending supplies for a range of Mexican dwarf varieties of wheat, which were to be bred with Japanese varieties. Initial testing in an experimental plot showed good results. The crop was high-yield, good quality, and disease free. There was hesitation by farmers to adopt the new variety whose high yields were unnerving. In 1964, following repeated requests by Swaminathan to demonstrate the new variety, he was given funding to plant small demonstration plots. A total of 150 demonstration plots on 1 hectare were planted. The results were promising and the anxieties of the farmers were reduced. More modifications were made to the grain in the laboratory to better suit Indian conditions. The new wheat varieties were sown and in 1968 production went to 17 million tonnes, 5 million tonnes more than the last harvest.

Just before receiving his Nobel Prize in 1970, Norman Borlaug wrote to Swaminathan:

The Green Revolution has been a team effort and much of the credit for its spectacular development must go to the Indian officials, organizations, scientists, and farmers. However, to you, Dr. Swaminathan, a great deal of the credit must go for first recognizing the potential value of the Mexican dwarfs. Had this not occurred, it is quite possible that there would not have been a Green Revolution in Asia.

Notable contributions were made by Indian agronomists and geneticists such as Gurdev Khush and Dilbagh Singh Athwal. The Government of India declared India self-sufficient in food production in 1971. India and Swaminathan could now deal with other serious issues of access to food, hunger, and nutrition. He was with IARI between 1954 and 1972.

=== Administrator and educator ===
In 1972, Swaminathan was appointed as the director-general of the Indian Council of Agricultural Research (ICAR) and a secretary to the Government of India. In 1979, in a rare move for a scientist, he was made a principal secretary, a senior position in the Government of India. The next year he was shifted to the Planning Commission. As director-general of ICAR, he pushed for technical literacy, setting up centres all over India for this. Droughts during this period led him to form groups to watch weather and crop patterns, with the ultimate aim of protecting the poor from malnutrition. His shift to the Planning Commission for two years resulted in the introduction of women and environment with respect to development in India's five year plans for the first time.

In 1982, he was made the first Asian director general of the International Rice Research Institute (IRRI) in the Philippines. He was there until 1988. One of the contributions he made during his tenure here was conducting an international conference "Women in Rice Farming Systems". For this, the United States–based Association for Women in Development gave Swaminathan their first award for "outstanding contributions to the integration of women in development". As director general, he spread awareness among rice-growing families of making the value of each part of the rice crop. His leadership at IRRI was instrumental in the first World Food Prize being awarded to him. In 1984 he became the president and vice-president of the International Union for Conservation of Nature and World Wildlife Fund respectively.

In 1987 he was awarded the first World Food Prize. The prize money was used to set up the M.S. Swaminathan Research Foundation. Accepting the award, Swaminathan spoke of the growing hunger despite the increase in food production. He spoke of the fear of sharing "power and resources", and that the goal of a world without hunger remains unfinished. In their commendation letters, Javier Pérez de Cuéllar, Frank Press, President Ronald Reagan, and others recognized his efforts.

Swaminathan would go on to chair the World Food Prize Selection Committee following Borlaug. In ICAR, from the late 1950s onwards, he taught cytogenetics, radiation genetics, and mutation breeding. Swaminathan mentored numerous Borlaug‐Ruan interns, part of the Borlaug‐Ruan International Internship.

=== Institution builder ===
Swaminathan established the Nuclear Research Laboratory at the IARI. He played a role in and promoting the setting up of the International Crop Research Institute for the Semi-Arid Tropics in India; the International Board for Plant Genetic Resources (now known as Bioversity International) in Italy and the International Council for Research in Agro-Forestry in Kenya. He helped to build and develop a number of institutions and provided research support in China, Vietnam, Myanmar, Thailand, Sri Lanka, Pakistan, Iran, and Cambodia.

=== Later years ===
Swaminathan co-chaired the United Nations Millennium Project on hunger from 2002 to 2005 and was head of the Pugwash Conferences on Science and World Affairs between 2002 and 2007. In 2005 Bruce Alberts, President of the U.S. National Academy of Sciences said of Swaminathan: "At 80, M.S. retains all the energy and idealism of his youth, and he continues to inspire good behaviour and more idealism from millions of his fellow human beings on this Earth. For that, we can all be thankful". Swaminathan had the aim of a hunger-free India by 2007.

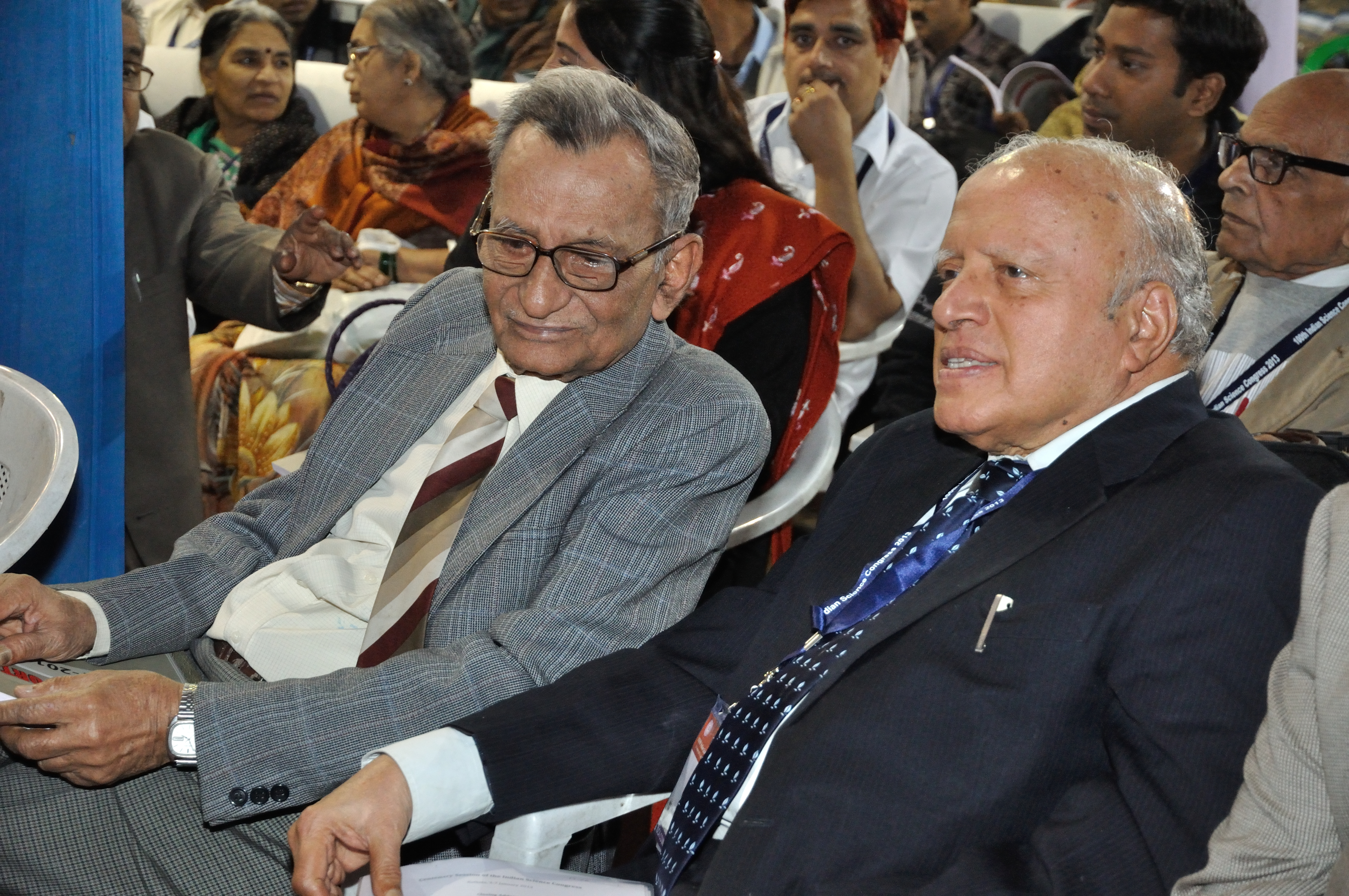
Swaminathan (right) with A. K. Sharma (left), considered as the father of Indian cytology, in 2013 at the 100th Indian Science Congress.

Swaminathan was the chair of the National Commission on Farmers constituted in 2004. In 2007, President A.P.J. Abdul Kalam nominated Swaminathan to the Rajya Sabha. Swaminathan introduced one bill during his tenure, The Women Farmers' Entitlements Bill 2011, which lapsed. One of the aims it proposed was recognising women farmers.

A term coined by Swaminathan, 'Evergreen Revolution', based on the enduring influence of the green revolution, aims to address the continuous increase in sustainable productivity that mankind requires. He has described it as "productivity with perpetuity".

In his later years, he had also been part of initiatives related to bridging the digital divide, and bringing research to decision-makers in the field of hunger and nutrition.

=== Personal life and death ===
He was married to Mina Swaminathan, whom he met in 1951 while they were both studying at Cambridge. They lived in Chennai, Tamil Nadu. Their three daughters are Soumya Swaminathan (a paediatrician), Madhura Swaminathan (an economist), and Nitya Swaminathan (gender and rural development).

Gandhi and Ramana Maharshi influenced his life. Of the 2000 acres owned by their family, they donated one-third to Vinoba Bhave's cause. In an interview in 2011, he said that when he was young, he followed Swami Vivekananda.

Swaminathan died at home in Chennai on 28 September 2023, at age 98.

== Scientific career ==
=== Potato ===
In the 1950s, Swaminathan's explanation and analysis of the origin and evolutionary processes of potato was a major contribution. He elucidated its origin as an autotetraploid and its cell division behaviour. His findings related to polyploids were also significant. Swaminathan's thesis in 1952 was based on his basic research related to "species differentiation and the nature of polyploidy in certain species of the genus Solanum, section Tuberarium". The impact was the greater ability to transfer genes from a wild species to the cultivated potato.

What made his research on potatoes valuable was its real-world application in the development of new potato varieties. During his postdoctoral fellowship at the University of Wisconsin, he helped develop a frost-resistant potato. His genetic analysis of potatoes, including the genetic traits that govern yield and growth, important factors in increasing productivity, was pivotal. His multi-disciplinary systems approach perspective brought together many different genetic facets.

=== Wheat ===
In the 1950s and 1960s Swaminathan did basic research into the cytogenetics of hexaploid wheat. The varieties of wheat and rice developed by Swaminathan and Borlaug were foundational to the green revolution.

=== Rice ===
Efforts towards growing rice with C_{4} carbon fixation capabilities, which would allow a better photosynthesis and water usage, were started at IRRI under Swaminathan. Swaminathan also played a role in the development of the world's first high-yielding basmati.

=== Radiation botany ===
The Genetics Division of the IARI under Swaminathan was globally renowned for its research on mutagens. He set up a 'Cobalt-60 Gamma Garden' to study radiation mutation. Swaminathan's association with Homi J. Bhabha, Vikram Sarabhai, Raja Ramana, M. R. Srinivasan and other Indian nuclear scientists allowed agricultural scientists to access facilities at the Atomic Energy Establishment, Trombay (which would later become the Bhabha Atomic Research Centre). Swaminathan's first PhD student, A. T. Natarajan, would go on to write his thesis in this direction. One of the aims of such research was to increase plant responsiveness to fertilisers and demonstrate real-world application of crop mutations. Swaminathan's early basic research on the effects of radiation on cells and organisms partly formed the base of future redox biology.

Rudy Rabbinge calls Swaminathan's paper on neutron radiation in agriculture in 1966 presented at an International Atomic Energy Agency conference in the United States as "epoch-making". The work of Swaminathan and his colleagues was relevant to food irradiation.

== Public recognition ==
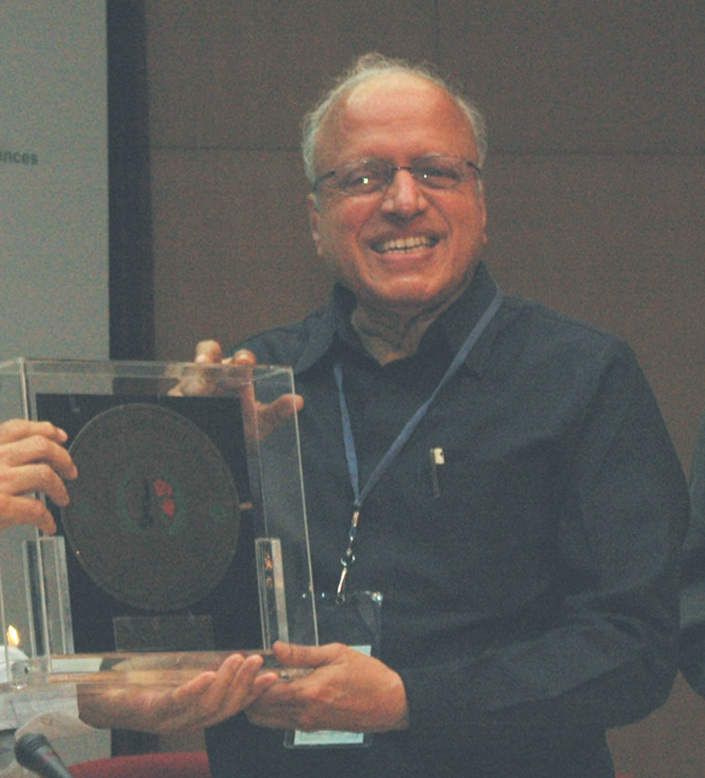
The B. P. Pal Centenary Award, eponymously named after the Indian agricultural scientist, being awarded to Swaminathan in 2006.

=== Awards and honours ===
Swaminathan received the Mendel Memorial Medal from the Czechoslovak Academy of Sciences in 1965. Following this he received numerous international awards and honours, including the Ramon Magsaysay Award (1971), the Albert Einstein World Science Award (1986), the first World Food Prize (1987), the Tyler Prize for Environmental Achievement (1991), the Four Freedoms Award (2000), and the Planet and Humanity Medal of the International Geographical Union (2000). When accepting the Ramon Magsaysay Award, Swaminathan quoted Seneca: "A hungry person listens neither to reason, nor to religion, nor is bent by any prayer.". Academy of Grassroots Studies and Research of India (AGRASRI), Tirupati, awarded him the Rajiv Gandhi Outstanding Leadership National Award for the year 2006 on 20 August 2006 at Tirupati, by Shri Rameshwar Thakur, the then Governor of Orissa and Andhra Pradesh. Dr. Swaminathan delivered the 5th Rajiv Gandhi Memorial Lecture on 20 August 2006 at Tirupati.

He was conferred with the Order of the Golden Heart of the Philippines, the Order of Agricultural Merit of France, the Order of the Golden Ark of Netherlands, and the Royal Order of Sahametrei of Cambodia. China awarded him with the "Award for International Co-operation on Environment and Development". In the 'Dr Norman E. Borlaug Hall of Laureates' at Des Moines, Iowa, United States, there is an artwork of Swaminathan made up of 250,000 pieces of glass. The IRRI has named a building and a scholarship fund after him.

One of the first national awards he received was the Shanti Swarup Bhatnagar Award in 1961. Following this he was conferred Padma Shri, Padma Bhushan, and Padma Vibhushan awards, as well as the H K Firodia award, the Lal Bahadur Shastri National Award, and the Indira Gandhi Prize. As of 2016, he had received 33 national and 32 international awards. In 2004, an agricultural think-tank in India named an annual award after Swaminathan, the eponymously named 'Dr. M.S. Swaminathan Award for Leadership in Agriculture'.

On 9 February 2024, he was conferred the Bharat Ratna posthumously, the highest civilian award of the Republic of India. On that occasion, then PM of India, Narendra Modi wrote:

It is a matter of immense joy that the Government of India is conferring the Bharat Ratna on Dr. MS Swaminathan Ji, in recognition of his monumental contributions to our nation in agriculture and farmers’ welfare. He played a pivotal role in helping India achieve self-reliance in agriculture during challenging times and made outstanding efforts towards modernizing Indian agriculture. We also recognise his invaluable work as an innovator and mentor and encouraging learning and research among several students. Dr. Swaminathan’s visionary leadership has not only transformed Indian agriculture but also ensured the nation’s food security and prosperity. He was someone I knew closely and l always valued his insights and inputs.

=== Honorary doctorates and fellowships ===
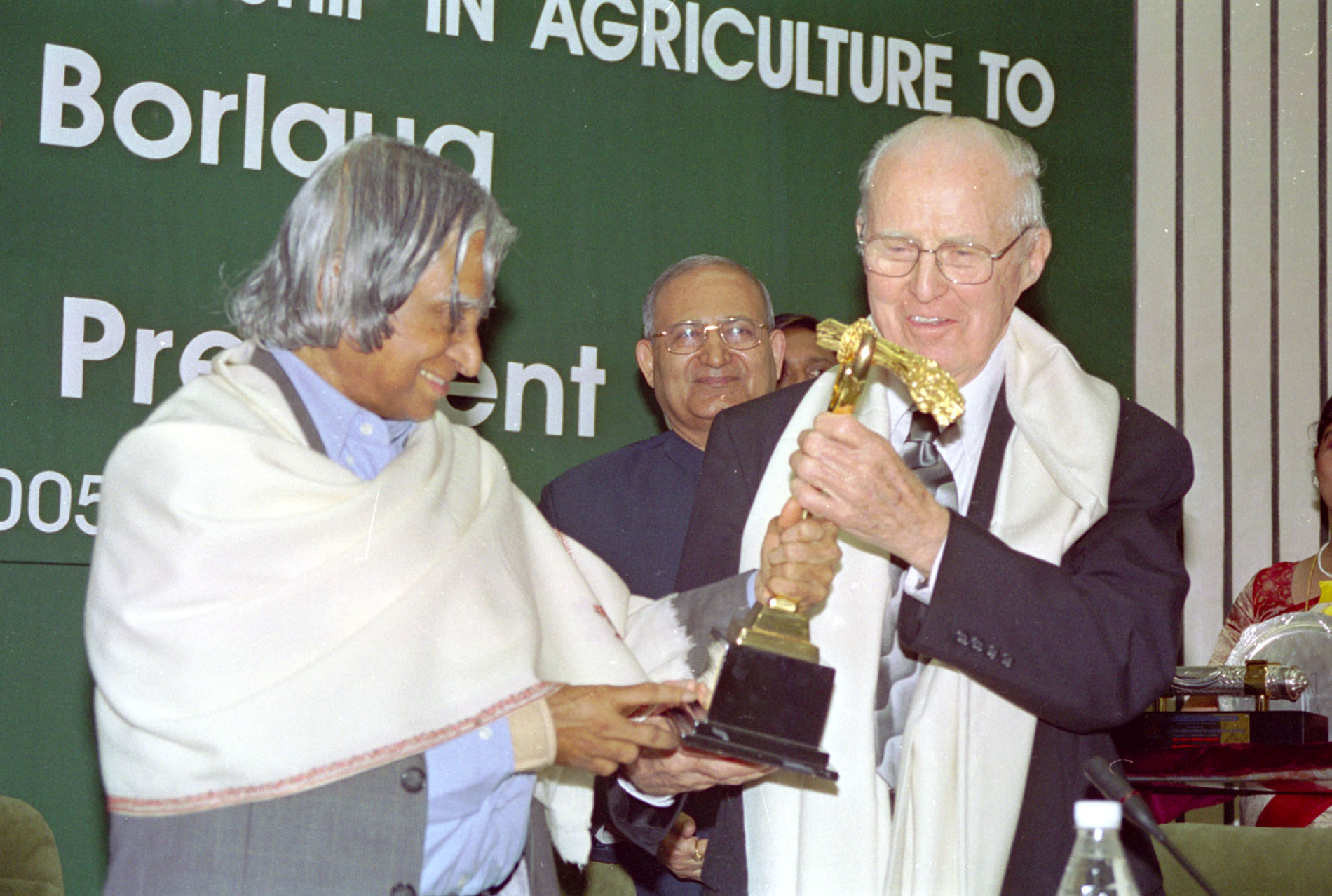
Norman E. Borlaug being awarded the first M. S. Swaminathan Award for Leadership in Agriculture by President A. P. J. Abdul Kalam in New Delhi in 2005.

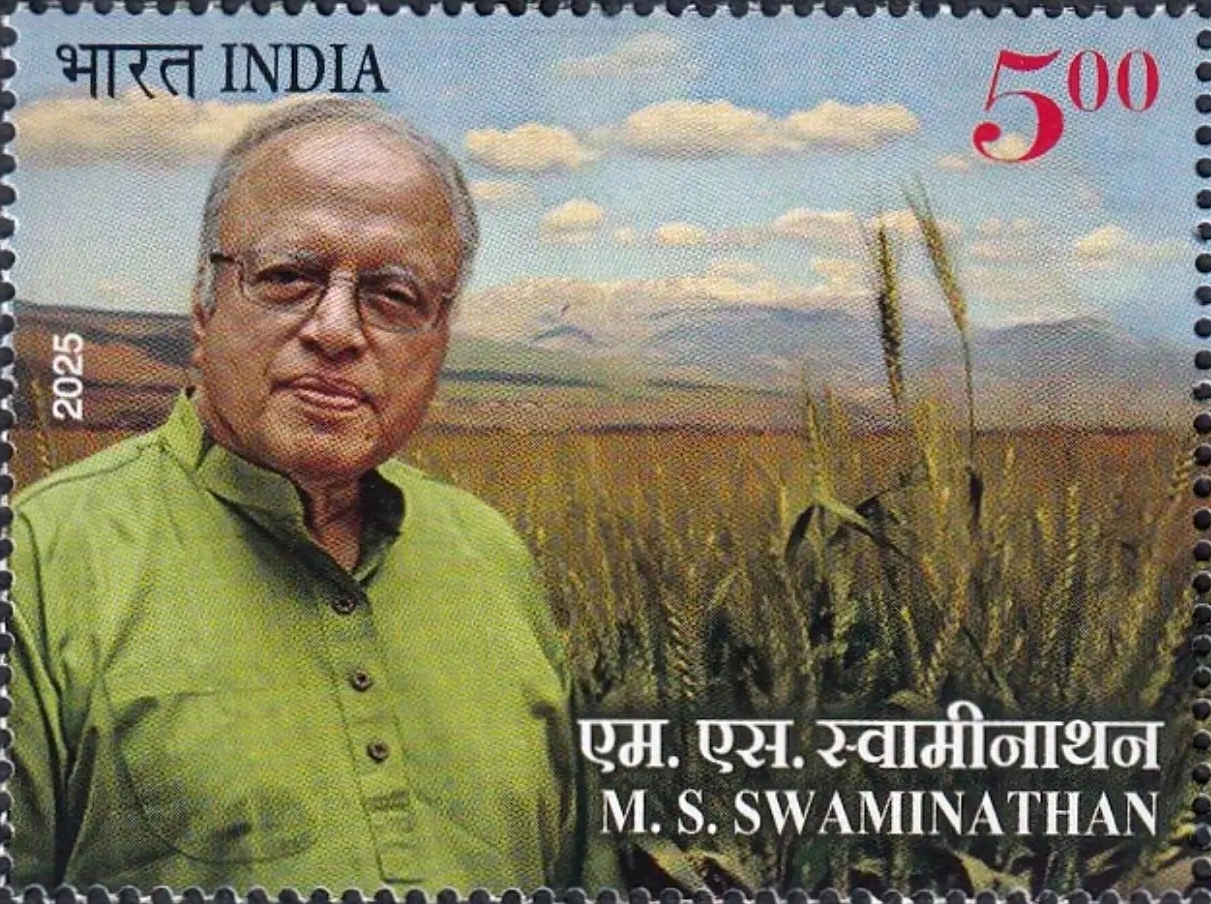
MS Swaminathan 2025 stamp of India

Swaminathan was the recipient of 84 honorary doctorates and was a guide for numerous Ph.D. scholars. Sardar Patel University conferred him with an honorary degree in 1970; Delhi University, Banaras Hindu University and others would follow. Internationally, Technische Universität Berlin (1981) and the Asian Institute of Technology (1985) honoured him. The University of Wisconsin honoured Swaminathan with an honorary doctorate in 1983. When the University of Massachusetts, Boston, honoured him with a science doctorate, they commented on the "magnificent inclusiveness of [Swaminathan's] concerns, by nation, socioeconomic group, gender, inter-generational, and including both human and natural environments". Fitzwilliam College, Cambridge, from where he received his PhD in botany, made him an honorary fellow in 2014.

Swaminathan had been elected a fellow of a number of science academies in India. Internationally he had been recognised as a fellow by 30 academies of science and societies across the world including the United States, the United Kingdom (Fellow of the Royal Society), Russia, Sweden, Italy, China, Bangladesh, as well as the European Academy of Arts, Science and Humanities. He was a founder fellow of The World Academy of Sciences. The National Agrarian University in Peru conferred him with an honorary professorship.

== Publications ==
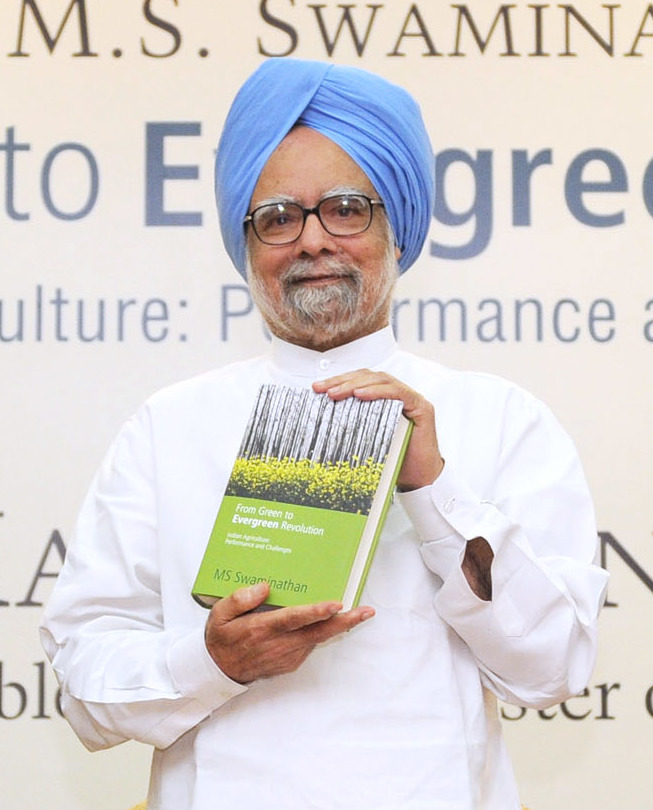
Prime Minister of India M. Singh with From Green to Evergreen Revolution

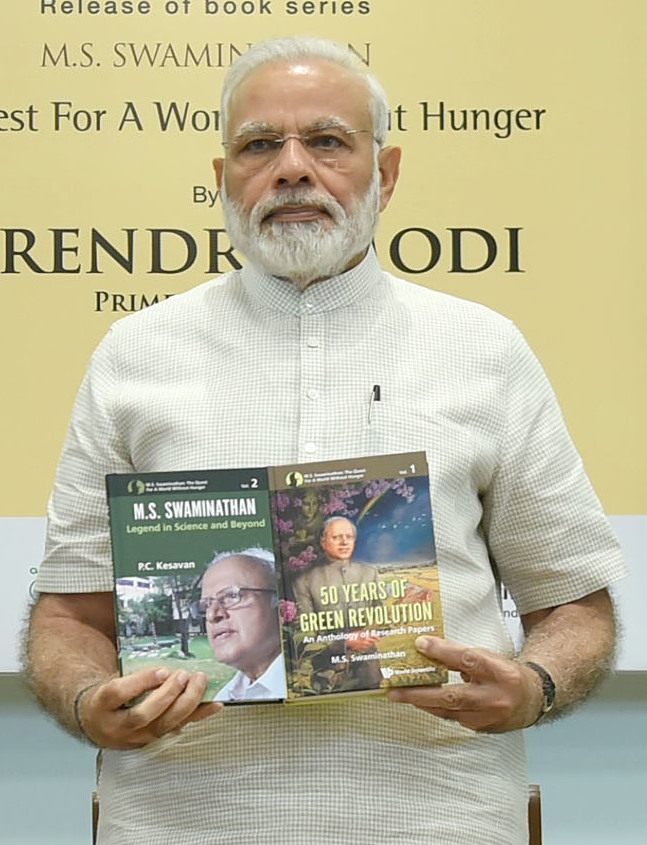
Prime Minister of India N. Modi with a two-part book series on Swaminathan

Swaminathan published 46 single-author papers between 1950 and 1980. In total he had 254 papers to his credit, 155 of which he was the single or first author. His scientific papers are in the fields of crop improvement (95), cytogenetics and genetics (87) and phylogenetics (72). His most frequent publishers were Indian Journal of Genetics (46), Current Science (36), Nature (12) and Radiation Botany (12). Selected publications include:

- Swaminathan, M.S. (1951). "Notes on induced polyploids in the tuber-bearing Solanum species and their crossability with Solanum tuberosum". American Potato Journal. 28: 472–489. doi:10.1007/BF02854980. S2CID 38717901.
- Howard, H. W.; Swaminathan, M. S. (1953). "The cytology of haploid plants of Solanum demissum". Genetica. 26 (1): 381–391. doi:10.1007/BF01690622. ISSN 0016-6707. PMID 13142313. S2CID 39650946.
- Swaminathan, M. S.; Hougas, R. W. (1954). "Cytogenetic Studies in Solanum verrucosum Variety Spectabilis". American Journal of Botany. 41 (8): 645–651. doi:10.2307/2438291. ISSN 0002-9122. JSTOR 2438291.
- Swaminathan, M. S. (1 January 1954). "Nature of Polyploidy in Some 48-Chromosome Species of the Genus Solanum, Section Tuberarium". Genetics. 39 (1): 59–76. doi:10.1093/genetics/39.1.59. ISSN 0016-6731. PMC 1209637. PMID 17247468.
- Swaminathan, M. S. (November 1955). "Overcoming Cross-Incompatibility among some Mexican Diploid Species of Solanum". Nature. 176 (4488): 887–888. Bibcode:1955Natur.176..887S. doi:10.1038/176887b0. ISSN 1476-4687. S2CID 4266064.
- Swaminathan, M. S. (September 1956). "Disomic and Tetrasomic Inheritance in a Solanum Hybrid". Nature. 178 (4533): 599–600. Bibcode:1956Natur.178..599S. doi:10.1038/178599b0. ISSN 1476-4687. S2CID 4298507.
- Swaminathan, M. S.; Murty, B. R. (1 November 1959). "Aspects of Asynapsis in Plants. I. Random and Non Random Chromosome Associations". Genetics. 44 (6): 1271–1280. doi:10.1093/genetics/44.6.1271. ISSN 0016-6731. PMC 1224432. PMID 17247892.

In addition he has written a few books on the general theme of his life's work, biodiversity and sustainable agriculture for alleviation of hunger. Swaminathan's books, papers, dialogues and speeches include:

- Swaminathan, M. S.; Kochhar, S. L. (2019). Major Flowering Trees of Tropical Gardens. Cambridge University Press. ISBN 978-1-108-48195-3.
- Swaminathan, M. S. (2017). 50 Years of Green Revolution: An Anthology of Research Papers. World Scientific. ISBN 978-981-320-007-4.
- Swaminathan, M. S. (2014). "EDITORIAL: Zero hunger". Science. 345 (6196): 491. Bibcode:2014Sci...345..491S. doi:10.1126/science.1258820. JSTOR 24745192. PMID 25082671. S2CID 206560890.
- Swaminathan, M. S. (2011). In Search Of Biohappiness: Biodiversity And Food, Health And Livelihood Security. World Scientific. ISBN 978-981-4462-56-3.
- Swaminathan, M. S. (2010). Science and Sustainable Food Security: Selected Papers of M S Swaminathan. World Scientific. ISBN 978-981-4282-11-6.
- Swaminathan, M. S. (September 2006). "An Evergreen Revolution". Crop Science. 46 (5): 2293–2303. Bibcode:2006CrSci..46.2293S. doi:10.2135/cropsci2006.9999.
- Swaminathan, M. S.; Ikeda, Daisaku (2005). Revolutions to Green the Environment, to Grow the Human Heart: A Dialogue Between M.S. Swaminathan, Leader of the Ever-green Revolution and Daisaku Ikeda, Proponent of the Human Revolution. East West Books (Madras). ISBN 978-81-88661-34-3.
- Halving Hunger: It Can Be Done. United Nations Millennium Project Hunger Task Force. 2005. Bibcode:2005hhcb.book.....U.
- Swaminthan, M. S., ed. (1998). Gender Dimensions in Biodiversity Management. Papers presented at a workshop held at MSSRF in June 1997. Konark Publishers. ISBN 978-81-220-0531-8.
- Swaminathan, M. S. (1997). "Implementing the benefit-sharing provisions of the Convention on Biological Diversity: Challenges and opportunities". Plant Genetic Resources Newsletter (No. 112). pp. 19–27 – via ecolex.org.
- Swaminathan, M.S., ed. (1993). Wheat Revolution—A dialogue. Macmillan India.

=== Controversies ===
In the 1970s, a scientific paper in which Swaminathan and his team claimed to have produced a mutant breed of wheat by gamma irradiation of a Mexican variety (Sonora 64) resulting in Sharbati Sonora, claimed to have a very high lysine content, led to a major controversy. The case was claimed to be an error made by the laboratory assistant. The episode was also compounded by the suicide of an agricultural scientist. It has been studied as part of a systemic problem in Indian agriculture research.

A paper published in the 25 November 2018 edition of Current Science titled 'Modern Technologies for Sustainable Food and Nutrition Security' listed Swaminathan as a co-author. The article was criticised by a number of scientific experts, including K. VijayRaghavan, the principal scientific adviser to the Government of India, who commented that it was "deeply flawed and full of errors". Swaminathan claimed that his role in the paper was "extremely limited" and that he shouldn't have been named as the co-author.

== Cited and general references and further reading ==
- Hariharan, G. N.; Kesavan, P. C. (2015). "Birth and growth of M.S. Swaminathan Research Foundation, Chennai". Current Science. 109 (3): 502–512. JSTOR 24906104.
- Denning, Glenn (2015). "Fostering international collaboration for food security and sustainable development: a personal perspective of M. S. Swaminathan's vision, impact and legacy for humanity". Current Science. 109 (3): 447–455. JSTOR 24906099.
- Rabbinge, Rudy (2015). "M. S. Swaminathan: his contributions to science and public policy". Current Science. 109 (3): 439–446. JSTOR 24906098.
- Yadugiri, V. T. (2011). "M. S. Swaminathan". Current Science. 101 (8): 996–1002. JSTOR 24079264.
- Singh, Kamal (January 2016). "M S Swaminathan "Father of Indian Green Revolution". Interview" (PDF). Biotech Express. Vol. 3, no. 30. pp. 6–17. ISSN 2454-6968.
- Kalyane, V.L. (July–September 1992). "Dr M.S. Swaminathan – Biologist Par Excellence" (PDF). Biology Education: 246–248 – via CORE, Open University.
- Kesavan, P. C.; Iyer, R. D. (25 December 2014). "M. S. Swaminathan: a journey from the frontiers of life sciences to the state of a 'Zero Hunger' world". Current Science. 107 (12): 2036–2051.

=== Biographies ===
Books

- Gopalkrishnan, G (2002). M.S. Swaminathan: One Man's Quest for a Hunger-free World. Education Development Centre. OCLC 643489739.
- Iyer, R. D. (2002). Scientist and Humanist: M.S. Swaminathan. Bharatiya Vidya Bhavan. ISBN 978-81-7276-260-5.
- — Iyer, R. D., An extract from Scientist and Humanist: M. S. Swaminathan., harmonyindia.org, archived from the original on 27 September 2007
- Kesavan, P. C. (2017). M.S. Swaminathan: Legend In Science And Beyond. World Scientific. ISBN 978-981-320-011-1.
- Parasuraman (13 August 2020). Perasiriyar Maa Saa Swaminathan Vazhum Panium (Thesis). hdl:10603/294255.
- Erdélyi, András (2002). The Man who Harvests Sunshine: The Modern Gandhi: M.S. Swaminathan. Tertia. ISBN 978-963-9387-08-9.
- Dil, Anwar S; Swaminathan, Monkombu Sambasivan (2005). Life and work of M. S. Swaminathan toward a hunger-free world. East West Books (Madras). ISBN 978-81-88661-33-6. OCLC 1068850456.
- Deulgaonkar, Atul (2000). स्वामीनाथन: भूकमुक्तीचा ध्यास [Swaminathan: Bhukmukticha Dhyas (Liberator from hunger)]. Sadhana Prakashan. ISBN 978-93-86273-19-2.

Short biographies

- Quinn, Kenneth M. (1 August 2015). "M. S. Swaminathan-Scientist, Hunger Fighter, World Food Prize Laureate". Current Science. 109 (3): 417–429. doi:10.18520/cs/v109/i3/417-429 (inactive 9 November 2026). EBSCOhost 108871418. Archived from the original on 28 November 2021.
- Gopalan, Shanti (30 March 2007). Scientists of International Repute. Sura Books. pp. 39–44. ISBN 978-81-7478-628-9.
