= Mina Swaminathan =

Indian educationist (1933–2022)

- Born: 29 March 1933; Delhi, British Raj
- Died: 14 March 2022 (aged 88); Chennai, Tamil Nadu, India
- Education: Delhi University; Cambridge University
- Occupation: Educationist
- Spouse: M. S. Swaminathan (m. 1955)
- Children: Three; including Soumya

Mina Swaminathan (29 March 1933 – 14 March 2022) was an Indian educationist in the field of pre-school education. As a teacher at St. Thomas's School, New Delhi, she developed methods using drama in education and language learning, both inside and outside the classroom. In children's drama, she developed techniques for creative improvisation, and in writing and production of documentary mime plays. Meena Swaminathan was married to Indian Agricultural Scientist, and "Father of Green Revolution" M.S. Swaminathan, whom she met in 1951 while they were both studying at Cambridge.

== Early life ==
Swaminathan was born on 29 March 1933 to Mathuram and Subrahmanya Bhoothalingam. Her mother was a novelist and playwright who wrote in Tamil and English under the penname Krithika, while her father was an Indian civil servant and economist.

She earned her B.A.(Hons) in 1951 from Delhi University and B.A.(Hons) in 1953, Cambridge University. Her M.A.(English) in 1958 from Panjab University, earned her B.Ed. in 1956 from Central Institute of Education. She earned her M.A.(Cantab) in 1961 Economics from Cambridge University.

== Career ==
Swaminathan was an educator who focused on early childhood education and gender and development studies. She was the chairman of the committee that studied development of the pre-school child that was set up by the Indian Central Advisory Board of Education in 1970. The committee's recommendations became the basis for Integrated Child Development Services (ICDS), a program that targeted interventions in early childhood care and development.

Swaminathan was a consultant to UNESCO on early childhood care and education, as well as to UNICEF when she undertook assignments in Vietnam and Kampuchea. She was Secretary and later President of the Indian Association for Pre-school Education, as well as Editor of its journal, and a Member of the Central Advisory Board of Education (CABE). She was also part of the board of trustees in the non-profit M. S. Swaminathan Research Foundation (MSSRF) based in Chennai, Tamil Nadu.

She also focused her efforts on studying gender equality as an activist and also as a founding member of the Centre for Women's Development Studies, a woman and gender development organization, in 1980. She served as the center's vice-chairperson from 1987 through 1993. Her research focus included gender equality, women farmers' rights, rural poverty and its impact on women in rural communities, in addition to early childhood growth and education.

Swaminathan was the author of several books on the subject of drama and child development and contributed articles to leading publications. Her publications included manuals for teachers and day care workers on care and education of children below six, a study of day care for poor working women in India. She was a recipient of the Homi Bhabha fellowship in 1973.

== Select works ==
- Swaminathan, Mina (1991). "Child Care Services in Tamil Nadu". Economic and Political Weekly. 26 (52): 2988–2992. ISSN 0012-9976. JSTOR 41625418.
- Swaminathan, Mina (1993). "Breast-Feeding and Working Mothers: Laws and Policies on Maternity and Child Care". Economic and Political Weekly. 28 (18): 887–891. ISSN 0012-9976. JSTOR 4399677.
- Swaminathan, Mina (1993). "Breast-Feeding and Working Mothers". Economic and Political Weekly. 28 (39): 2099–2100. ISSN 0012-9976. JSTOR 4400206.
- Swaminathan, Mina (1995). "A 'Miracle' Really, but Not Divine". Economic and Political Weekly. 30 (52): 3350–3351. ISSN 0012-9976. JSTOR 4403612.
- Swaminathan, Mina (1996). "Innovative Child Care Programmes in India". International Journal of Early Years Education. 4 (2): 41–56. doi:10.1080/0966976960040204. ISSN 0966-9760.
- Swaminathan, Mina (1997). "Gender and Agricultural Workers". Economic and Political Weekly. 32 (30): 1919. ISSN 0012-9976. JSTOR 4405685.
- Swaminathan, Mina (2003). "Training for Child Care and Education Workers in India". International Journal of Early Years Education. 2 (1): 67–76. doi:10.1080/09669760.2003.10807107. ISSN 0966-9760. S2CID 144745731.
- Swaminathan, Mina (2009). "Sixth Pay Commission: Class and Gender Bias". Economic and Political Weekly. 44 (14): 22–24. ISSN 0012-9976. JSTOR 40278694.

== Personal life ==
Swaminathan was married to Indian agricultural scientist, M.S. Swaminathan, whom she met in 1951 while they were both studying at Cambridge. She was studying economics at Newnham College while he was pursuing his PhD at the school of agriculture in the same university. The couple married in 1955 after their return to India. They lived in Chennai, Tamil Nadu, and had three daughters and five grandchildren. Their daughters include, Dr. Soumya Swaminathan, the Chief Scientist at WHO, Dr. Madhura Swaminathan, Professor of Economics at the Indian Statistical Institute, Bangalore and Nitya Rao, a Senior Lecturer in Gender Analysis and Development at the University of East Anglia.

Swaminathan died from natural causes at her home in Teynampet, Chennai on 14 March 2022, at the age of 88.
