= M. S. Swaminathan Research Foundation =

- Abbreviation: MSSRF
- Formation: 1988
- Founder: M. S. Swaminathan
- Type: Nonprofit NGO trust
- Legal status: Active
- Headquarters: Chennai, India
- Region served: India
- Fields: Sustainable development, science and technology for rural development, environmental stability
- Chairman: Dr. M. S. Swaminathan
- Main organ: Board of Trustees
- Award: Blue Planet Prize (1996)
- Website: www.mssrf.org

The M. S. Swaminathan Research Foundation (MSSRF) is a nonprofit NGO trust based in Chennai, India. It develops and promotes strategies for economic growth that directly target increased employment of poor women in rural areas. Their methods maximize the use of science and technology for equitable and sustainable social development and environmental stability. The MSSRF logo signifies continuity and change, invoking the DNA model of open-ended, many-sided, and continuous evolution.

== History ==
MSSRF was founded in 1988 by Dr. M. S. Swaminathan, who is chairman of the foundation. In 1970, C.V. Raman, the Nobel Prize-winning physicist, urged Swaminathan to start an autonomous research centre to realize his goals of sustainable development, which he now terms the "Evergreen Revolution". In 1988, after receiving the World Food Prize, Swaminathan used the US$200,000 prize to start the MSSRF. Swaminathan also currently holds the UNESCO Chair in Ecotechnology and is chairman of the National Commission on Agriculture, Food and Nutrition Security of India.

== Regional centres and field sites ==
1. CAC (Community Agrobiodiversity Centre), Wayanad, Kerala.
2. BPTBC (Biju Patnaik Tribal Biodiversity Centre), Jeypore, Odisha.
3. FFARTC (Fish For All Research and Training Centre), Poompuhar, Tamil Nadu.
4. Biocentre Puducherry.
5. EGBC (Eastern Ghats Biodiversity Centre), Namakkal, Tamil Nadu.
6. CSR (Coastal Systems Research), Machilipatnam, Andhra Pradesh.

== Programs ==
MSSRF operates in five major program areas — Coastal Systems Research, Biodiversity and Biotechnology, Ecotechnology and Food security, Gender and development, and Informatics.

== Awards and honours ==
The foundation was awarded the Blue Planet Prize in 1996.

== See also ==
- Indian Council of Forestry Research and Education
- Van Vigyan Kendra (VVK) Forest Science Centres
