= Green Revolution in India =

Modernization of agriculture

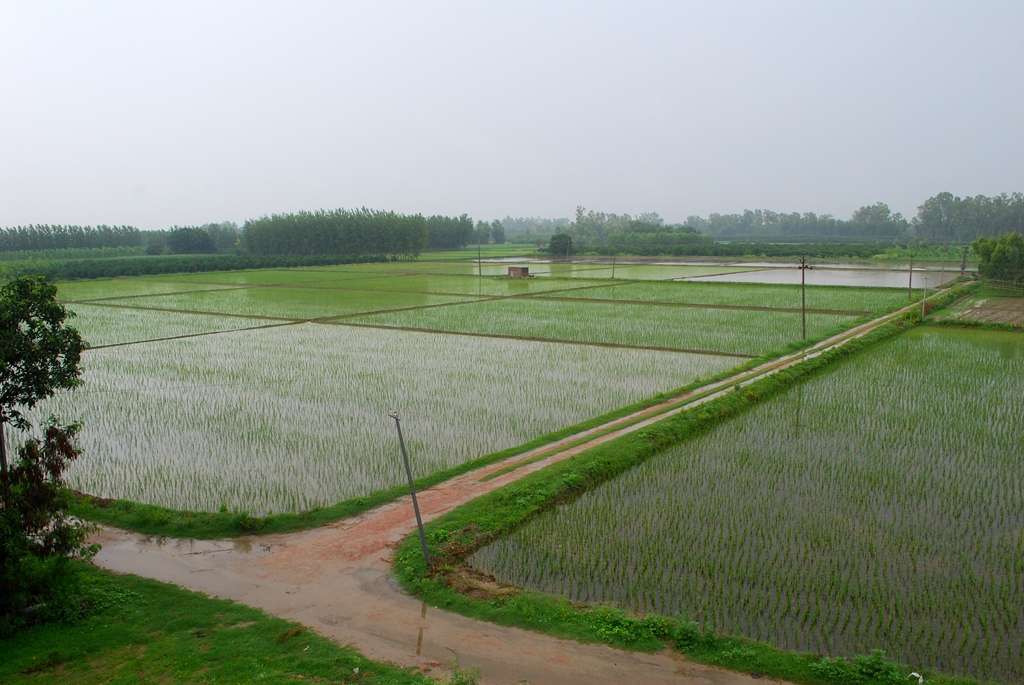
The state of Punjab led India's Green Revolution and earned the distinction of being the "breadbasket of India."

Change in cereal production, yield, land use and population, India

The Green Revolution in India was a period that began in the 1960s during which agriculture in India was converted into a modern industrial system by the adoption of technology, such as the use of high-yielding varieties of crops, and fertilisers. Mainly led by agricultural scientist M. S. Swaminathan in India, this period was part of the larger Green Revolution endeavour initiated by Norman Borlaug, which leveraged agricultural research and technology to increase agricultural productivity in the developing world. Varieties or strains of crops can be selected by breeding for various useful characteristics such as disease resistance, response to fertilisers, product quality and high yields.

Under the premiership of Indira Gandhi, the Green Revolution within India commenced in 1968, leading to an increase in food grain production, especially in Punjab, Haryana, and Western Uttar Pradesh. Major milestones in this undertaking were the development of high-yielding varieties of wheat, and rust-resistant strains of wheat.

== Notable figures and institutions ==
Farmers, young and old, educated and uneducated, have easily taken to the new agronomy. It has been heart-warming to see young college graduates, retired officials, ex-army men, illiterate peasants and small farmers queuing up to get the new seeds.

— M. S. Swaminathan, (1969) Punjab Miracle. The Illustrated Weekly of India

A number of people have been recognised for their efforts during India's Green Revolution.

- M. S. Swaminathan, the main architect or the Father of the Green Revolution in India and the director-general of the Indian Council of Agricultural Research.
- Chidambaram Subramaniam, the food and agriculture minister at the time, a Bharat Ratna, has been called the Political Father of the Green Revolution.
- Dilbagh Singh Athwal, known as the Father of the Wheat Revolution.
- Scientists such as Atmaram Bhairav Joshi.
- Institutions such as Indian Agricultural Research Institute (IARI).

== Rationale for the Green Revolution ==
The Green Revolution in India was first introduced in Punjab in late 1966-67 as part of a development program issued by international donor agencies and the Government of India.

During the British Raj, India's grain economy hinged on a unilateral relation of exploitation. Consequently, when India gained independence, the weakened country quickly became vulnerable to frequent famines, financial instabilities, and low productivity. These factors formed a rationale for the implementation of the Green Revolution as a development strategy in India.

- Frequent famines: In 1964–65 and 1965–66, India experienced two severe droughts which led to food shortages and famines among the country's growing population. Modern agricultural technologies appeared to offer strategies to counter the frequency of famines. There is debate regarding India's famines prior to independence, with some arguing they were intensified by British taxation and agrarian policies in the 19th and 20th centuries, and others downplaying such effects of colonial rule.
- Lack of finance: Marginal farmers found it very difficult to get finance and credit at economical rates from the government and banks and hence, fell as easy prey to the money lenders. They took loans from landlords, who charged high rates of interest and also exploited the farmers later on to work in their fields to repay the loans (farm labourers). Proper financing was not given during the Green Revolution period, which created a lot of problems and sufferings for the farmers of India. The government also helped those under loans.
- Low productivity: In the context of India's rapidly growing population, the country's traditional agricultural practices yielded insufficient food production. By the 1960s, this low productivity led India to experience food grain shortages that were more severe than those of other developing countries. Agricultural technological advancements offered opportunities to increase productivity.

== Practices ==
=== Wheat and rice production ===
The main development was higher-yielding varieties of wheat, for developing rust-resistant strains of wheat. The introduction of high-yielding varieties (HYV) of seeds and the improved quality of fertilisers and irrigation techniques led to the increase in the production to make the country self-sufficient in food grains, thus improving agriculture in India. Also, other varieties such as Kalyan Sona and Sonalika were introduced by cross-breeding of wheat with other crops.

Since growing rice has high water requirements, the production of rice was mainly enhanced by improved irrigation infrastructure such as canal systems and groundwater irrigation. The creation of HYVs, such as the Jaya variety in southern India, was also important to rice production.

The enhanced production of wheat and rice has been credited with improving India's self-sufficiency and with making India a major food exporter. Along with technological advancements, the enthusiasm of farmers mobilised the idea of an agricultural revolution. Due to the rise in the use of chemical pesticides and fertilisers, as well as increased use of groundwater, there was an increase in soil toxicity.

=== Other practices ===
The other practices include use of pesticides, insecticides and herbicides, consolidation of holdings, land reforms, improved rural infrastructure, supply of agricultural credit, use of chemical or synthetic fertilisers, and use of advanced machinery.

== Criticism ==
The Green Revolution yielded great economic prosperity during its early years. In Punjab, where it was first introduced, the Green Revolution led to significant increases in the state's agricultural output, supporting India's overall economy. By 1970, Punjab was producing 70% of the country's total food grains and farmers' incomes were increasing by over 70%. Punjab's prosperity following the Green Revolution became a model to which other states aspired to reach. However, despite the initial prosperity experienced in Punjab, the Green Revolution was met with much controversy throughout India.

=== Indian economic sovereignty ===
Criticism of the effects of the green revolution includes the cost for many small farmers using HYV seeds, with their associated demands of increased irrigation systems and pesticides. For instance, farmers buying Monsanto BT cotton seeds were told these seeds produced 'non-natural insecticides'. In reality, they still had to pay for expensive pesticides and irrigation systems, which led to increased borrowing to finance the change from traditional seed varieties. Many farmers had difficulty paying for the expensive technologies, especially if they had a bad harvest. These high costs of cultivation pushed rural farmers to take out loans—typically at high interest rates. Over-borrowing entrapped the farmers into a cycle of debt.

India's liberalised economy further exacerbated the farmers' economic conditions. Indian environmentalist Vandana Shiva writes that this is the "second Green Revolution". The first Green Revolution, she suggests, was mostly publicly funded (by the Indian Government). This new Green Revolution, she says, is driven by private (and foreign) interest—notably MNCs like Monsanto—as encouraged by Neoliberalism. Ultimately, this is leading to foreign ownership over most of India's farmland, undermining farmers' interests.

=== Environmental damage ===
Excessive and inappropriate use of fertilisers and pesticides polluted waterways and killed beneficial insects and wildlife. It has caused over-use of soil and rapidly depleted its nutrients. The rampant irrigation practices led to eventual soil degradation. Groundwater practices have fallen dramatically. Further, heavy dependence on few major crops has led to the loss of biodiversity of farmers and the increase of stubble burning cases since 1980. These problems were aggravated due to the absence of training to use modern technology and vast illiteracy leading to excessive use of chemicals.

=== Increased regional disparities ===
The green revolution spread only in irrigated and high-potential rain-fed areas. The villages or regions without access to sufficient water were left out that widened the regional disparities between adopters and non-adopters. This is because the HYV seeds technically can be applied only on land with assured water supply and availability of other inputs like chemicals and fertilisers. The application of the new technology in dry-land areas is infeasible.

States like Punjab, Haryana, Uttar Pradesh, etc. having good irrigation and other infrastructure facilities were able to derive the benefits of the green revolution and achieve faster economic development while other states have recorded slow growth in agriculture production.

== Alternative farming methods ==
In the years since the Green Revolution was adopted, issues of sustainability have come up due to the adverse environmental and social consequences. To meet this challenge other alternatives to farming have emerged like small subsistence farms, family homesteads, New Age communes, village and community farming collectives and women's cooperatives with the common purpose of producing organically grown, chemical-free food. In green revolution areas of the country, increasing numbers of families are experimenting on their own with alternative systems of land management and the growing of crops. Building upon the idea of sustainable development, commercial models for large-scale food production have been developed by integrating traditional farming systems with appropriate energy efficient technology.
