= National Commission on Farmers =

Indian government commission

- राष्ट्रीय किसान आयोग
- Emblem of India

Commission overview
- Formed: 18 November 2004; 22 years ago
- Jurisdiction: Government of India
- Commission executive: M.S. Swaminathan, Chairman

The National Commission on Farmers (NCF) is an Indian commission constituted on 18 November 2004 under the chairmanship of Professor M.S. Swaminathan to address the nationwide calamity of farmers suicides in India. The Terms of Reference reflected the priorities listed in the Common Minimum Programme. The NCF submitted four reports in December 2004, August 2005, December 2005 and April 2006 respectively. The fifth and final report was submitted on 4 October 2006. The reports contain suggestions to achieve the goal of "faster and more inclusive growth" as envisaged in the Approach to 11th Five Year Plan and are collectively termed the M.S. Swaminathan report for farmers

The final report of the Commission was focused on causes of farmer distress and the rise in farmer suicides in India and recommended addressing them through a holistic national policy for farmers

The key recommendations from the Commission incorporated in Revised Draft National Policy for Farmers include asset reforms covering land, water, livestock, and bioresources farmer-friendly support services; and curriculum reforms in the agriculture universities

== Composition ==
The composition of the reconstituted National Commission on Farmers is as under:

- Chairman – M.S. Swaminathan
- Full-time Members – Ram Badan Singh, Y.C. Nanda
- Part-time Members – R. L. Pitale, Jagadish Pradhan, Chanda Nimbkar, Atul Kumar Anjan
- Member Secretary – Atul Sinha

== Terms of reference ==
1. Work out a comprehensive medium-term strategy for food and nutrition security .
2. Propose methods of enhancing the productivity, profitability, stability, and sustainability of the major farming systems
3. Bring about the synergy between technology and public policy
4. Suggest measures to attract and retain educated youth in farming
5. Suggest policy reforms designed to enhance investment in Agricultural Research, increase the flow of rural credit to farmers
6. Formulate special programs for dryland farming
7. Suggest measures for enhancing the quality and cost competitiveness of farm commodities
8. Recommend measures for the credit, knowledge, skill, technological and marketing empowerment of women
9. Suggest methods of empowering members of elected local bodies to discharge their role in conserving and improving the ecological foundations for sustainable agriculture effectively

== Implementation ==
Its implementation is not done yet due to lack of funds by government in these suggestions.
