= Florence MacLeod Harper =

Canadian journalist

Florence MacLeod Harper (fl. 1917-1918) was a Canadian journalist from Woodstock, Ontario sent by U.S. newspaper Frank Leslie's Illustrated Newspaper as a staff reporter with an assignment to cover World War I on the Eastern front. She was an early female war correspondent and one of a handful of western journalists to leave a first-hand journalistic account of the early stages of the Russian revolution.

Unusually independent for a female journalist of the time, unusual altogether as a female war correspondent, she was a trailblazer for better-known female war correspondents covering later conflicts. Harper arrived in St. Petersburg via Siberia on a long slow and dirty train. Dividing her time between staff hospitals on the front line and St. Petersburg, she witnessed first hand the March Revolution in St. Petersburg in 1917 and later events in July, before leaving for the British Empire in August, departing on the same boat as Emmeline Pankhurst.

With war photographer Donald Thomson, she created the photo book Bloodstained Russia and From Tsar to Kaiser: The betrayal of Russia. In 1918, she published Runaway Russia, describing events at greater length. After leaving Russia, she continued to report on the effects of the Revolution from Finland.

Her testimony has been widely quoted in several later works covering the early stages of the revolution, for instance in Caught in the revolution by Helen Rappaport, but she is less well known than other trailblazing female journalists of the time, such as Louise Bryant who covered the November Revolution of the same year but who was arguably less independent, traveling out with her husband John Reed and arriving at around the time Harper was leaving St. Petersburg.

By her own account, Harper saw early on that revolution was inevitable. "In fact, I was so sure of it," Harper later wrote, "that I wandered around the town, up and down the Nevsky, watching and waiting for it as I would for a circus parade."
