= Gertrude Emerson Sen =

American educator, writer, and editor

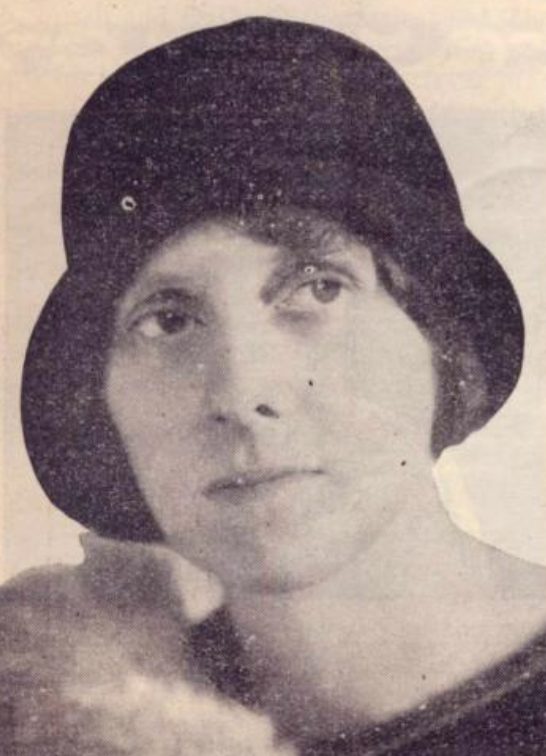
- Sen from a 1936 issue of The Indian Listener
- Born: May 6, 1890
- Died: 1982 (aged 91–92)
- Education: University of Chicago
- Occupations: Educator, writer, editor
- Spouse: Basiswar Sen (m. 1932; died 1971)
- Relatives: Alfred E. Emerson (brother); Edith Emerson (sister)
- Awards: Padmashri (1976)

Gertrude Emerson Sen (6 May 1890 – 1982) was an early 20th-century expert on Asia and a founding member of the Society of Woman Geographers.

== Early life and education ==
Gertrude Emerson was the daughter of Alfred Emerson, Sr., and Alice Edwards Emerson. Her father was an archaeologist and professor at Cornell University; her mother was a concert pianist. She was the sister of famed entomologist Alfred Emerson, and of artist Edith Emerson who served as president and curator of Philadelphia's Woodmere Art Gallery (1940–1978). Another brother, Willard, was a banker.

Emerson graduated from the University of Chicago.

== Career ==
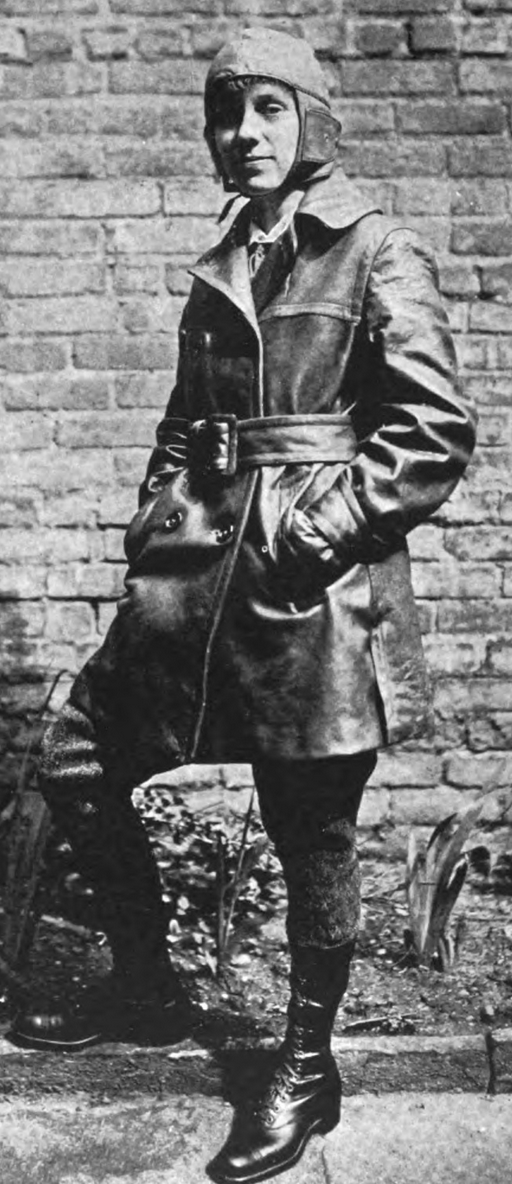
A photograph of Emerson taken by Elizabeth Buehrmann, from a 1920 publication

After teaching English in Japan, Sen returned to the United States to become the associate editor of Asia magazine in 1917. In 1920, she undertook a round-the-world expedition with photographer Donald Thompson which included stunt flying and caving. In 1925, she was one of the founding members of the Society of Women Geographers. In 1926, she traveled from Beirut through the Arabian Desert and Afghanistan to India. In 1941, she was named a contributing editor to Asia magazine.

Eventually she settled in Almora in northeastern India, participated in rural life, and came to love the culture of her adopted country. Her attachment is reflected in her books Voiceless India (1930), Pageant of India's History (1948), and Cultural Unity of India (1965). Although not born in India herself, she strongly disapproved on the involvement of non-Indians in subcontinental matters. She was awarded with Padmashri for literature and education in 1976 by Government of India.

== Personal life ==
Emerson married Indian native Basiswar Sen on November 1, 1932, in Calcutta. Basiswar Sen was a scientist and one of the favorite students of legendary scientist Jagadish Chandra Bose. He was also a very close associate of Swami Vivekananda, Sister Nivedita. Gertrude Emerson Sen died in 1982, aged 91 or 92. Her papers are with the Emerson family's papers at the New York Public Library.

== Sources ==
- Girish N. Mehra, Nearer Heaven Than Earth—The Life and Times of Boshi Sen and Gertrude Emerson Sen, foreword by M.S. Swami. New Delhi: Rupa & Co., 2007.

== See also ==
- Ernestine Evans
