= Soumya Swaminathan =

Indian and WHO Deputy Director general

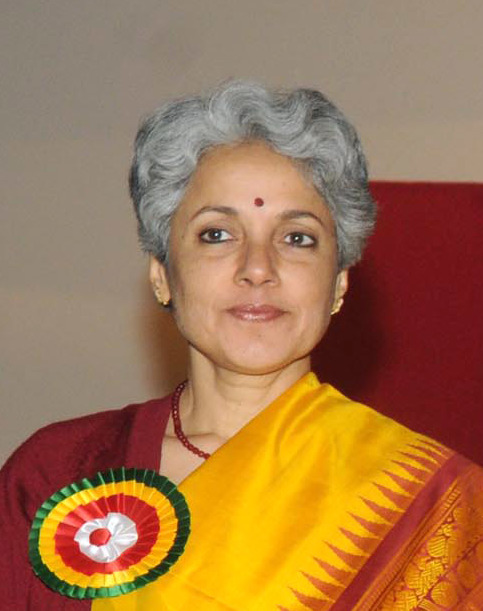
- Swaminathan in 2016
- Born: 2 May 1959 (age 67); Madras, Madras State (present day Chennai, Tamil Nadu), India
- Education: Armed Forces Medical College, Pune; All India Institute of Medical Sciences, New Delhi; Children's Hospital Los Angeles; Keck School of Medicine of USC, Los Angeles
- Occupations: Paediatrician; Medical researcher
- Title: Chief Scientist, World Health Organization
- Spouse: Ajit Yadav
- Children: 2
- Parents: M. S. Swaminathan (father); Mina Swaminathan (mother)

Deputy Director of the World Health Organization
- In office 2017 – March 2019

Soumya Swaminathan (born 2 May 1959) is an Indian paediatrician and clinical scientist known for her research on tuberculosis and HIV. Soumya served as Secretary to the Government of India for Health Research and Director General of the Indian Council of Medical Research (2015–2017), where she prioritized evidence-based health policy, research capacity building in medical schools, and strengthening south-south partnerships in health sciences. From October 2017 to March 2019, she was the deputy director general of programmes (DDP) at the World Health Organization. Subsequently till 2022, she served as the chief scientist at the World Health Organization under the leadership of Director General Tedros Adhanom Ghebreyesus.

== Early life and education ==
Soumya Swaminathan was born in Chennai, Tamil Nadu, India. Soumya is the daughter of "Father of Green Revolution of India", M. S. Swaminathan and Indian educationalist Mina Swaminathan. Soumya has two siblings, Madhura Swaminathan, a professor of economics at the Indian Statistical Institute, Bangalore, and Nitya Rao, a professor of gender and development at the University of East Anglia.

Soumya received an M.B.B.S. from the Armed Forces Medical College in Pune. She has an M.D. in pediatrics from All India Institute of Medical Sciences in New Delhi. She is a Diplomate of National Board from National Board of Examinations. As part of her training, from 1987 to 1989 Soumya completed a post-doctoral medical fellowship in neonatology and pediatric pulmonology at the Children's Hospital Los Angeles at the Keck School of Medicine of USC.

== Career ==
=== Early career ===
From 1989 to 1990, Soumya was a research fellow (registrar) in the Department of Pediatric Respiratory Diseases at the University of Leicester in the United Kingdom.

She then worked as a senior research officer (Supernumerary Research Cadre), Cardiopulmonary Medicine Unit, as well as an adjunct associate clinical professor at the Department of Public Health and Family Medicine at Tufts University School of Medicine in Massachusetts.

In 1992, Soumya joined the National Institute for Research in Tuberculosis a/k/a Tuberculosis Research Centre, where she was Coordinator, Neglected Tropical Diseases. She later became the director of the National Institute for Research in Tuberculosis.

From 2009 to 2011, Soumya was coordinator of the UNICEF/UNDP/World Bank/WHO Special Programme for Research and Training in Tropical Diseases in Geneva.

Until 2013, she was director, National Institute for Research in Tuberculosis (NIRT) in Chennai.

From August 2015 to November 2017, Soumya was director general of the Indian Council of Medical Research (ICMR) and secretary of the Department of Health Research (Ministry of Health & Family Welfare) for the Government of India.

=== Career with WHO ===
From October 2017 to March 2019, Soumya was deputy director-general of the World Health Organization.

In March 2019, Soumya became chief scientist of the World Health Organization, where she notably participated in regular twice weekly press briefings on the COVID-19 pandemic. She has urged countries to conduct whole genome sequencing of the SARS-CoV-2 virus more frequently and to upload sequences to the GISAID project.

In the preparations for the Global Health Summit hosted by the European Commission and the G20 in May 2021, Soumya was a member of the event's High Level Scientific Panel.

Starting April 1, 2025, she will be serving as one of NUS Board of Trustees.

== Selected research ==
Soumya's areas of interest are paediatric and adult tuberculosis (TB), epidemiology and pathogenesis, and the role of nutrition in HIV-associated TB.

While at the National Institute for Research in Tuberculosis in Chennai, Soumya started a multi-disciplinary group of clinical, laboratory and behavioural scientists studying various aspects of TB and TB/HIV. Soumya along with her colleagues were among the first to scale up the use of molecular diagnostics for TB surveillance and care, to undertake large field trials of community-randomised strategies to deliver TB treatment to underserved populations. She was part of the TB Zero City Project which aimed to create "Islands of elimination" working with local governments, institutions and grassroots associations.

In 2021, Soumya was also appointed to the Pandemic Preparedness Partnership (PPP), an expert group chaired by Patrick Vallance to advise the G7 presidency held by the government of Prime Minister Boris Johnson.

== Other activities ==
- Foundation for Innovative New Diagnostics (FIND), member of the board of directors (since 2023)
- Alliance for Health Policy and Systems Research, Member of the Board
- Coalition for Epidemic Preparedness Innovations (CEPI), non-voting member of the board (until 2022), voting member of the board (since 2023)
- GISAID, Member of the SAC Nomination Committee (since 2023)
- Global Antibiotic Research and Development Partnership (GARDP), non-voting member of the board of directors
- Global Coalition Against TB, member of the expert group
- WomenLift Health, member of the global advisory board
- Advisor, Resource Group for Education and Advocacy for Community Health (REACH)

== Awards ==
- 2016: AstraZeneca Research Endowment Award, presented by the National Institute of Pharmaceutical Education and Research, S.A.S. Nagar
- 2026: She was elected a Fellow of the Royal Society (FRS). She is the second Indian woman to be inducted into the academy and India's first father-daughter duo to receive the honor.

== Personal life ==
Soumya is married to Ajit Yadav, an orthopedic surgeon. The couple has a daughter, Shreya Yadav.

== Selected works and publications ==
- Murray, Christopher J L; Barber, Ryan M; Foreman, Kyle J; et al. (November 2015). "Global, regional, and national disability-adjusted life years (DALYs) for 306 diseases and injuries and healthy life expectancy (HALE) for 188 countries, 1990–2013: quantifying the epidemiological transition". The Lancet. 386 (10009): 2145–2191. doi:10.1016/S0140-6736(15)61340-X. PMC 4673910. PMID 26321261. Wikidata ()
- Forouzanfar, Mohammad H; Alexander, Lily; Anderson, H Ross; et al. (December 2015). "Global, regional, and national comparative risk assessment of 79 behavioural, environmental and occupational, and metabolic risks or clusters of risks in 188 countries, 1990–2013: a systematic analysis for the Global Burden of Disease Study 2013". The Lancet. 386 (10010): 2287–2323. doi:10.1016/S0140-6736(15)00128-2. PMC 4685753. PMID 26364544. Wikidata ()
- Krause, Philip R; Arora, Narendra; Dowling, William; Muñoz-Fontela, César; Funnell, Simon; Gaspar, Rogerio; Gruber, Marion F.; Hacker, Adam; Henao-Restrepo, Ana Maria; Plotkin, Stanley; Rees, Helen V.; Smith, Dean K.; Swaminathan, Soumya (September 2022). "Making more COVID-19 vaccines available to address global needs: Considerations and a framework for their evaluation". Vaccine. 40 (40): 5749–5751. doi:10.1016/j.vaccine.2022.07.028. PMC 9343170. PMID 35941036.
