= Krithika =

Tamil writer

- Born: Mathuram; 1915; Bombay, British India
- Died: 2009 (aged 93–94); Delhi, India
- Occupations: Writer, novelist, scriptwriter
- Spouse: S. Bhoothalingam
- Writing career
- Pen name: Krithika

Mathuram Bhoothalingam (pen name Krithika) was a Tamil writer who wrote plays and short stories in Tamil and English.

== Personal life ==
Krithika was born as Mathuram in a Kannada-speaking family in Bombay in 1915. At an early age, she moved to Delhi where she spent a considerable part of her life. She was married to Subrahmanya Bhoothalingam, an ICS officer from Delhi. The couple have a daughter, Mina Swaminathan.

Krithika died in 2009 at the age of 93.

== Literary career ==
Mathuram started writing under the pen name "Krithika" from an early age. Making her debut with the Tamil-language novel Puhai Naduvil, an acid look at the bureaucracy, she went on to write a number of children's stories, novels, and plays based on the puranas.

Her play Manathile Oru Maru was directed by another famous writer of her time, Chitti (P. G. Sundararajan), with whom she shared a strong bond of friendship. Chitti even authored a book titled An Introduction: Krithika and Mathuram Bhoothalingam. Midway through her career, Krithika also started to write in English.

As Krithika started to write children's books apart from adult-centric stories, she began using her given name. Krithika was one of the first Indian authors to regularly publish children's books in English. Some of her important works in English are Movement in Stone, which looks at early Chola temples and the influence of Pallava art prior to the 9th and 10th centuries; and, Yoga for Living (1996), a contemporary look at the direction of India.

Vasaveswaram is one of her works which focused on women and dealt with issues faced by them in the society. Krithika has also authored books on Hindu Epics such as Ramayana.

Her written correspondence with Chitti which spanned over 30 years have been brought together and published in the form of a book titled Lettered Dialogue by K. R. A. Narasaiah, a relative of Chitti.
