= Asia (magazine) =

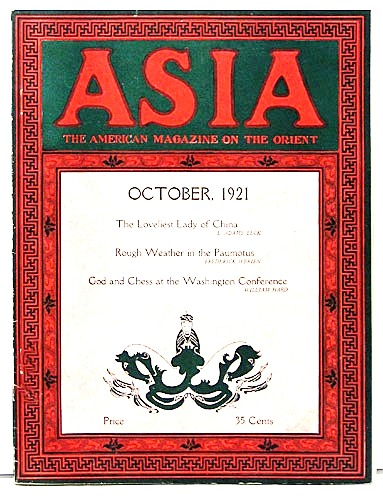
- Language: English
- Edited by: Louis D. Froelick; John Foord; Richard J. Walsh (1934–1942); Pearl S. Buck (1942–1946)

Publication details
- Former name: Journal of the American Asiatic Association
- History: 1898–1946
- Publisher: American Asiatic Association; East and West Association (1942–1946) (United States)
- Frequency: Monthly

Standard abbreviations
- ISO 4: Asia

Indexing
- OCLC no.: 1514415 760765404; 1514415

Asia was an American magazine that featured reporting about Asia and its people, including the Far East, Southeast Asia, South Asia, and the Middle East. From 1934 to 1946, it was edited by Richard J. Walsh, with extensive contributions from his wife, Pearl S. Buck. Under their influence, the journal published many prominent Asian literary and political figures and American authorities. It was headquartered in Orange, Connecticut. In 1946, after many years of financial trouble, it was merged into a new journal, United Nations World.

== Origins and development ==
Asia magazine was established by the American Asiatic Association in 1898 as Journal of the American Asiatic Association. An editorial in the Journal explained: "The ignorance of our people in regard to the countries of the Far East is unquestionably a serious obstacle to the legitimate extension of American influence." In 1917 Willard Straight, who had been involved in promoting American trade and investment in Korea and China since the turn of the century, and his wife, Dorothy Payne Whitney Straight, bought the magazine and renamed it Asia and continued its publication as a popular journal of commerce and travel. The Straights also were co-founders of The New Republic magazine.

When Willard Straight died of influenza in 1918, his widow took over publication of the magazine. She married Leonard K. Elmhirst in 1925. The editors included Louis D. Froelick and John Foord, and associate editors Gertrude Emerson and Marietta Neff. Elsie Weil, who joined the staff about 1920, was the long time managing editor.

Frank H. McIntosh painted many of the covers.

== Under Richard Walsh and Pearl S. Buck ==
In January 1934, although ownership remained unchanged, Richard J. Walsh, head of John Day publishers published his first issue as editor. He announced that the magazine would no longer be a tourist handbook, and despite objections from some readers, the magazine was shifted from advertising luxury goods, travel and promotion of American commerce in the Orient to discussion of international affairs and current Asian culture and literature. In the first editorial Walsh promised readers a wide range of topics and views. The magazine's political stance changed as well. Walsh wrote that it would "look upon Communism as objectively as upon art, and bring to religious concepts as open a mind as we bring to economic problems." Walsh soon brought his new wife, Pearl S. Buck, into the editorial process.

In the following years, Asia underwent revolution and war. Walsh, as publisher of John Day, and Buck, as America's most influential writer about Asia, attracted and recruited a new range of Asian and American writers, many of whom promoted an anti-colonial agenda, such as support for Indian independence, and anti-racist program. Subscriptions rose as Americans become more worried about the oncoming Second Sino-Japanese War. Writers included William Ernest Hocking, the Harvard liberal theologian; Hu Shih, leader of China's New Culture Movement; Owen Lattimore, the emerging authority on Central Asia; Lin Yutang; Jawaharlal Nehru, the Indian independence leader; and reporters such as Nathaniel Peffer; Edgar Snow, Nym Wales, and Theodore H. White, who reported from the front line on China before World War II. Buck wrote a regular book review column titled “Asia Book Shelf.” The magazine recruited corresponding editors to gather articles, including Gertrude Emerson Sen in India and H.J. Timperley, an Australian journalist in China.

In 1941, Walsh and Buck bought the magazine from the Elmhirsts. They changed the name to Asia and the Americas in November 1942, and Buck assumed the editorship. She continued her attacks on imperialism, particularly British, and offered strong support for colonial independence movements. With the end of the war in 1945, however, Americans lost interest in Asia and the magazine suffered a financial crisis. Buck resigned as editor in 1947 merged the magazine with Free World and Inter-American to form a new journal, United Nations World.
