= Dilbagh Singh Athwal =

Indian-American geneticist, plant breeder and agriculturist

- Born: 12 October 1928; India
- Died: 14 May 2017 (aged 88); New Jersey, United States
- Occupations: Plant breeder Agriculturist; Geneticist
- Known for: New varieties of wheat and rice
- Awards: Padma Bhushan; Shanti Swarup Bhatnagar Prize

Dilbagh Singh Athwal (12 October 1928 – 14 May 2017) was an Indian-American geneticist, plant breeder and agriculturist, known to have conducted pioneering research in plant breeding. He was a professor and the Head of the Department of Plant Breeding at Punjab Agricultural University and an associate of Norman Borlaug, a renowned biologist and Nobel Laureate, with whom he has collaborated for the introduction of high-yielding dwarf varieties of wheat.

Popularly known as Father of Wheat Revolution, he was instrumental in developing ‘PV 18’ in 1966 and the most popular amber grained wheat variety ‘Kalyansona’ in 1967. In 1967, he joined International Rice Research Institute's management team and ultimately served as the Institute's first deputy director general. His research has also returned several innovations in rice breeding and his body of work has been documented in a number of books and articles published in peer reviewed journals. The University of Sydney conferred the degree of Doctor of Philosophy on him in 1955 for his contributions to agriculture and, in 1964, he received Shanti Swarup Bhatnagar Prize of the Council of Scientific and Industrial Research, the highest Indian award in the Science category. The Government of India awarded him the third highest civilian honour of the Padma Bhushan, in 1975, for his contributions to biological science.

He died in New Jersey on 14 May 2017.

== Life ==
=== Early education ===
Athwal received his Bachelor of Science Degree in Agricultural Sciences at the Punjab University in 1948. Afterwards, he joined the Punjab Agricultural Services as the Agriculture Assistant in the Millet Breeding Scheme. Later, Athwal was awarded an international fellowship to study at the University of Sydney, where he received his PhD in Genetics and Plant Breeding in 1955. He returned to India in 1955 to start his career as a plant breeder as head of the plant breeding department at the Punjab Agricultural University.

=== Work at IRRI ===
Athwal’s career and advancement in plant breeding allowed Indian farmers to produce higher crop yields with greater nutritional value and paved the way for increasing food production in India. In 1967, he accepted a position as the assistant director of the International Rice Research Institute (IRRI). Athwal worked with new rice varieties such as IR8. IR, which stands for international rice is used as a prefix to the number rice crosses. The objective of IRRI’s breeding program was to create a variety that grew efficiently in the tropical region. IR8 was the first improved variety as it was more resistant to diseases, more sensitive to applied nitrogen, and had double yield potential. However, IR8 had poor grain quality and was not desirable to several Asian countries. Athwal's work contributed to the release of new varieties such as IR20, IR22, IR24, and IR26. These new varieties had IR8’s high yield potential and good grain quality. Athwal retired from the IRRI in 1977 and later joined the International Agriculture Development Services.

== Research ==
Athwal was known for his pioneering work in the development of wheat varieties from strains from Mexico in the 1960s. During his time at Punjab University, Athwal created a hybrid millet known as ‘HB-1’ (Hybrid Bajra 1) that dramatically transformed production in India by increasing yield from 3.5 million tons in 1965 to 8 million tons in 1970. With help from Nobel laureate, Dr. Norman Borlaug, Athwal selected breeding lines that were most beneficial and delivered those lines to wheat breeders across India.

Wheat varieties that prominently thrived in Punjab soil were red, which is considered unattractive for Indian consumers and farmers. Athwal’s solution was genetically modifying two wheat varieties, Lerma Rojo 64 and PV 18 (a high-yielding red-grained wheat variety). This modification produced amber-coloured grains that retained the desirable qualities of the sister strain. The genetic modification of two wheat varieties (eg. Lerma Rojo 64 and PV 18), using a multistep process, produced a variety of superior qualities such as higher resistance to rust. First, seeds from lines with similar genetic makeup and appearance are mechanically mixed to produce a multiline variety. These lines are bred for desired traits and the ones showing susceptibility to the undesirable quality are removed and replaced. Afterwards, the best lines with desirable traits (eg. rust resistance) are chosen and multiplied separately. These separate lines with the most desirable qualities are mixed and multiplied to grow before being released to farmers. According to the deputy director of CIMMYT’s (International Maize and Wheat Improvement Center) wheat program, multiline varieties should involve 15-20 lines.

Athwal’s work on crossing Lerma Rojo 64 and PV 18 and creating a new multiline gave rise to a new wheat variety which was named Kalyan 227, after Athwal’s home village. Kalyan 227 was released in 1967 and was known as “Kalyan Sona" or "Golden Savior". The Kalyan variety was released into the market in 1967. This variety was adopted by many farmers and the large-scale production of this wheat caused a wheat surplus in the 1970s.

== See also ==
- Punjab Agricultural University
- Norman Borlaug
- International Rice Research Institute
