= Indian Institute of Natural Resins and Gums =

Indian research institute

National Institute of Secondary Agriculture (NISA)
- Type: Registered Society
- Director: Dr. Abhijit Kar (Officer-in-Charge)
- Location: Namkum, Ranchi, Jharkhand, India; 23°19′49″N 85°22′29″E
- Nickname: IINRG
- Website: Web Site
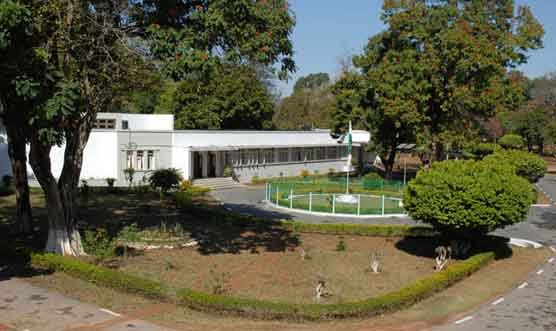

National Institute of Secondary Agriculture (NISA) formerly The Indian Institute of Natural Resins and Gums (IINRG) and Indian Lac Research Institute (ILRI) , is an autonomous institute, established under the umbrella of ICAR by the Ministry of Agriculture, Government of India for advanced research on lac and other natural resins and gums. The Institute is located at Namkum, Ranchi in Jharkhand, India.

== Profile ==
Mandate:

The Institute is mandated with the responsibility to:

- To plan, conduct and promote researches on lac production technologies.
- To conduct basic and applied researches on processing natural resins (including lac), natural gums and gum resins for farmers and industries.
- To develop value added products of commercial use from natural resins, gums and gum resins, leading to pilot plant demonstration.
- To act as repository and provider of information on lac production and processing, product development, utilization of all natural resins, gums and gum resins.
- To transfer the technologies to farmers, entrepreneurs and processors

The Indian Institute of Natural Resins and Gums (IINRG) was originally established as Indian Lac Research Institute (ILRI) for acting as a nodal agency for the research and development of lac and other natural resins and gums on 20 September 1924. The Institute was mandated to focus its attention on crop harvesting and tapping, produce processing, development of products, training, information repository, technology dissemination and liaison with other national and international agencies.

IINRG owes its origin to the recommendations of Lindsay- Harlow Committee, appointed by the erstwhile Imperial Government of India, in 1920, to study the various aspects of lac in the country. On the suggestions of the Committee, Indian Lac Association for Research, a consortium of lac merchants in India was formed. The Indian Lac Research Institute was started by the Association on 20 September 1920. In 1931, the institute was moved under a newly constituted Indian Lac Cess Committee (ILCC).

Later, when the Indian Lac Cess Committee (ILCC) was formed as per the findings and recommendations of the Royal Commission on Agriculture, the institute was transferred to ILCC on 1 August 1931. ILCC was given the control of the London Shellac Research Bureau, UK and Shellac Research Bureau and Polytechnique Institute of Brooklyn, USA as well.

The status remained in the post-independence India till 1966 when the Indian Council of Agricultural Research took over the reins of the Institute on 1 April 1966, becoming one of the earlier institutes under ICAR umbrella. On 20 September 2007, the institute was renamed as the Indian Institute of Natural Resins and Gums (IINRG) and was given an expanded mandate to cover all the natural resins and gums of Indian origin.

== Divisions ==
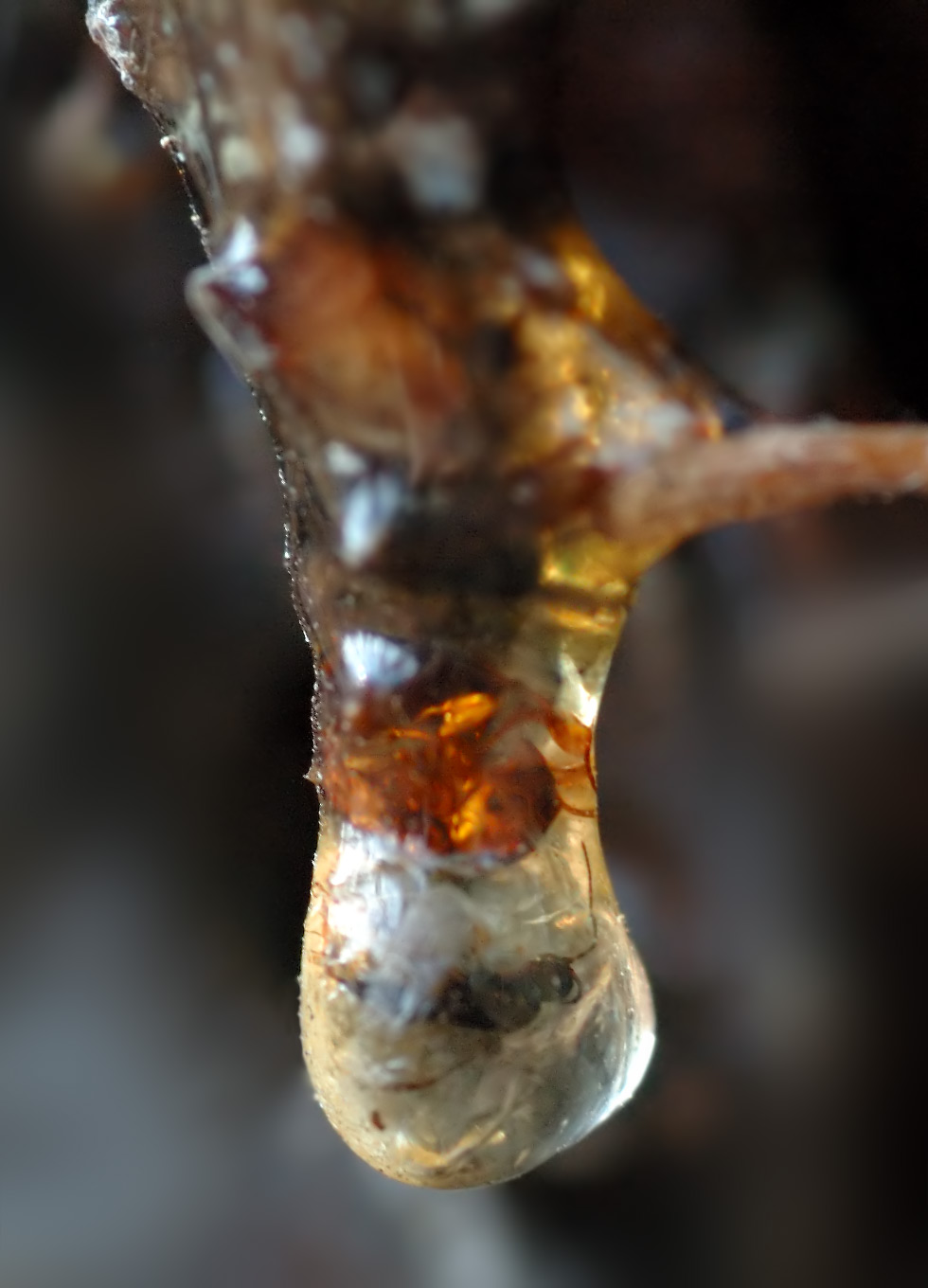
Insect trapped in resin

The activities of the Institute is primarily handled by three divisions, each entrusted with specific tasks.

=== Lac Production Division ===
LPD is involved in the research on improvement of production technologies of lac for which it focuses on the improvement of host plants and insects. It maintains a Lac Host and Lac Gene Bank and a biotechnology laboratory specifically for this purpose. Lac insect genetic stocks and host plant germplasms are characterized so that the ideal insect/host plant combination may be selected for developing effective production technologies.

=== Process and Product Development Division ===
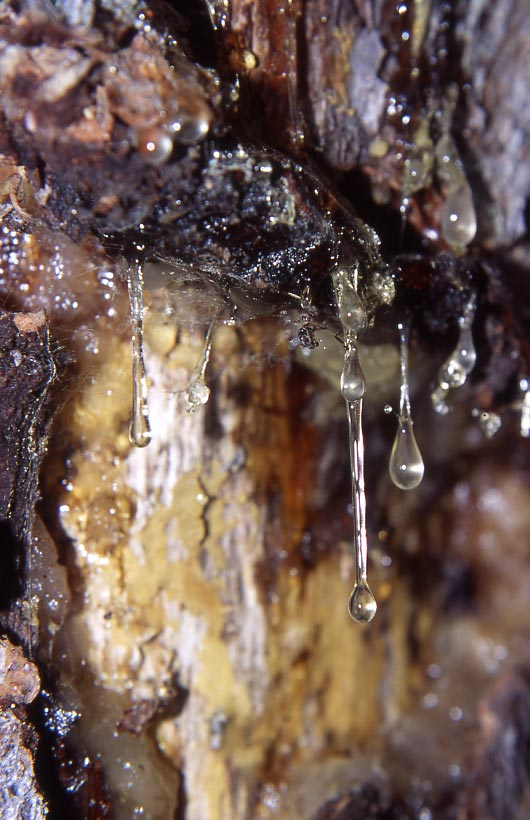
Resin of a pine

PPD Division is a later entrant into IINRG and is engaged in the research of processing and value addition processes of natural resins and gums. It attends to the various stages of value addition at the raw, semi-finished and finished natural resins and gums and is an accredited laboratory for the collection, analysis, testing and reporting of lac and lac based products. The Division is ISO-9001 certified and hosts a Processing and Demonstrating Unit with pilot plants for research, refinement, training and demonstration, aimed at entrepreneurial requirements.

=== Transfer of Technology Division ===
The Transfer of Technology division is the knowledge bank of IINRG and is responsible for the assessment, refinement and dissemination of the research knowledge as well as imparting training to the farmers and other interested parties on the subject. It also maintains a Lac Museum, displaying a comprehensive range of exhibits ranging from samples from different parts of the world, various technologies, uses of lac in industries such as cosmetics, wool dyeing, medicines and jewellery making.

== Facilities ==
IINRG maintains advanced facilities for the research such as: Biotechnology lab: Undertakes research and testing work on molecular and plant tissue culture and imparts training to scientists and students. Field Gene Bank: A repository for germplasm which has been recognised by National Bureau of Plant Genetics Resources as National Active Germplasm Site.

IINRG also has a modern conference hall for conferences, seminars and training sessions.

== Projects ==
IINRG is involved in many core in-house projects such as Productivity and Quality Improvement, Crop Production System Management, Processing, Storage and Quality Management, Value Addition, Application Development and Product Diversification, Capacity Building of Farmers and Entrepreneurship Development and Technology Evaluation, Refinement, Dissemination and Demonstration and a set of NAIP projects such as:

- To understand the nature of diversity in lac insects of Kerria spp. in India and the nature of insect x host interaction (NAIP- Component -4 )
- A value chain on lac and lac based products for domestic and export markets. (NAIP- Component -2)
- Developing sustainable framing models for prioritized micro water shed in rainfed area in Jharkhand with BAU, Ranchi. (NAIP Component-3)

The externally funded projects at IINRG are:

- Production of summer kusmi broodlac on kusum for promotion of lac cultivation in Gujarat with farmer's participation. (Forest Department, Silva Division, Gujarat)
- Climate change and lac crop performance
- Lac cultivation and processing unit establishment.
- FQ 3029 (NFBSFARA sponsored)
- Jute based bio-composites for industry

== National Network Project ==
IINRG is the Lead Coordinating Centre among 7 centres, for the National network Project for Harvesting, Processing and Value Addition of Natural Resins and Gums. The main objects of research are rosins (Pinus roxburghii), guar gum (Cyamopsis tetragonoloba), karaya gum (Sterculia urens), gum Arabic (Acacia Senegal) and guggul (Commiphora mukul). It is also involved in the preparation of agroforestry models on resins and gums.

== Publications ==
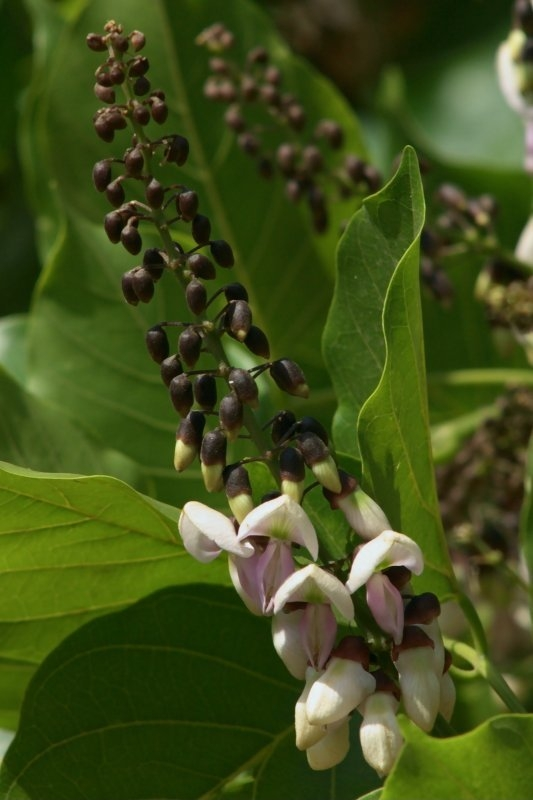
Pongam or Honge (Millettia pinnata) is a native of India and grows in profusion, generally planted as avenue trees by the forest department. It is renowned for its shade and is well known in traditional uses for its medicinal properties. It is also grown as a host plant for lac insects. The tree is also one of the food plants for Common Cerulean (Jamides celeno).

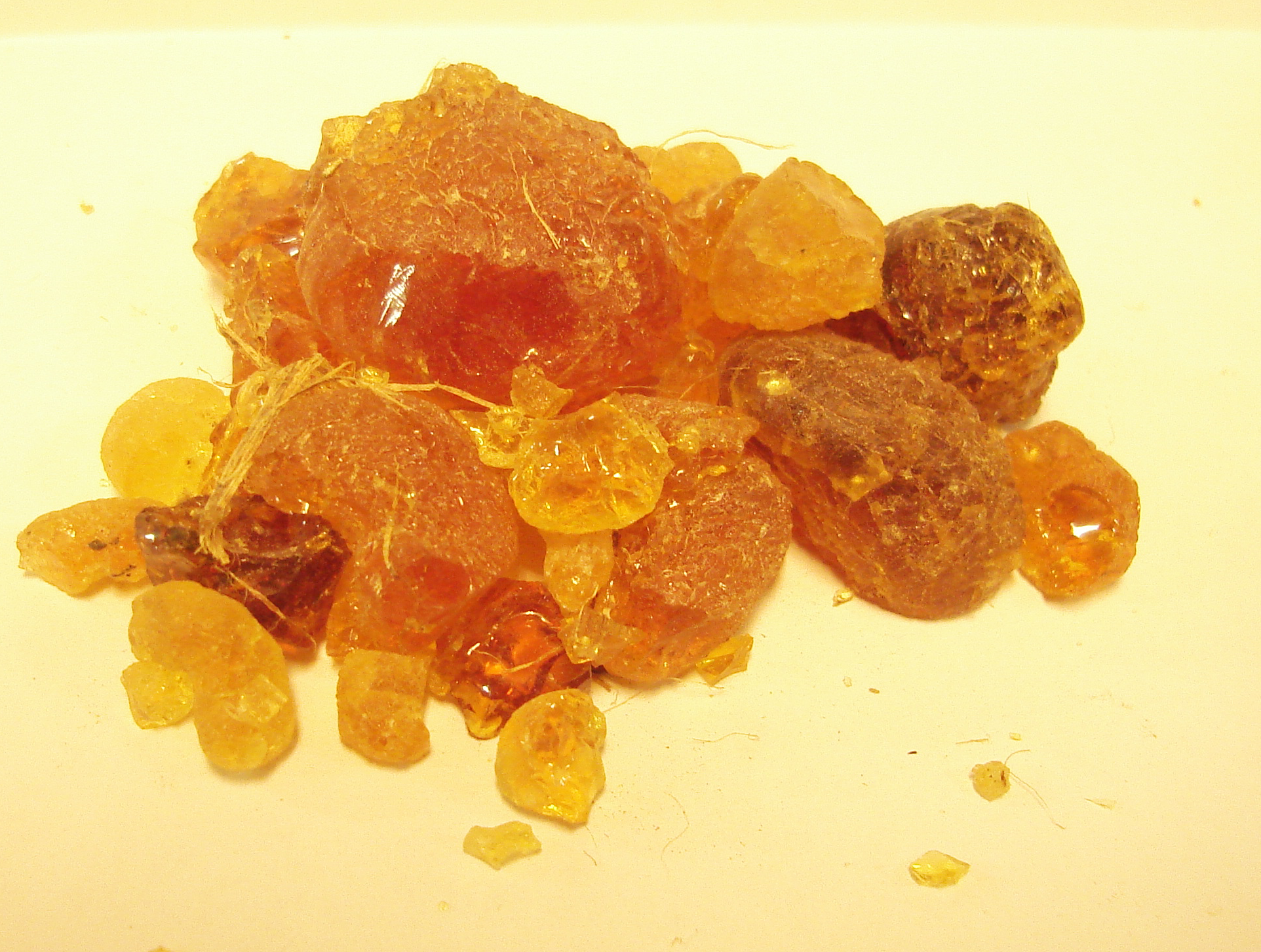
Acacia gum

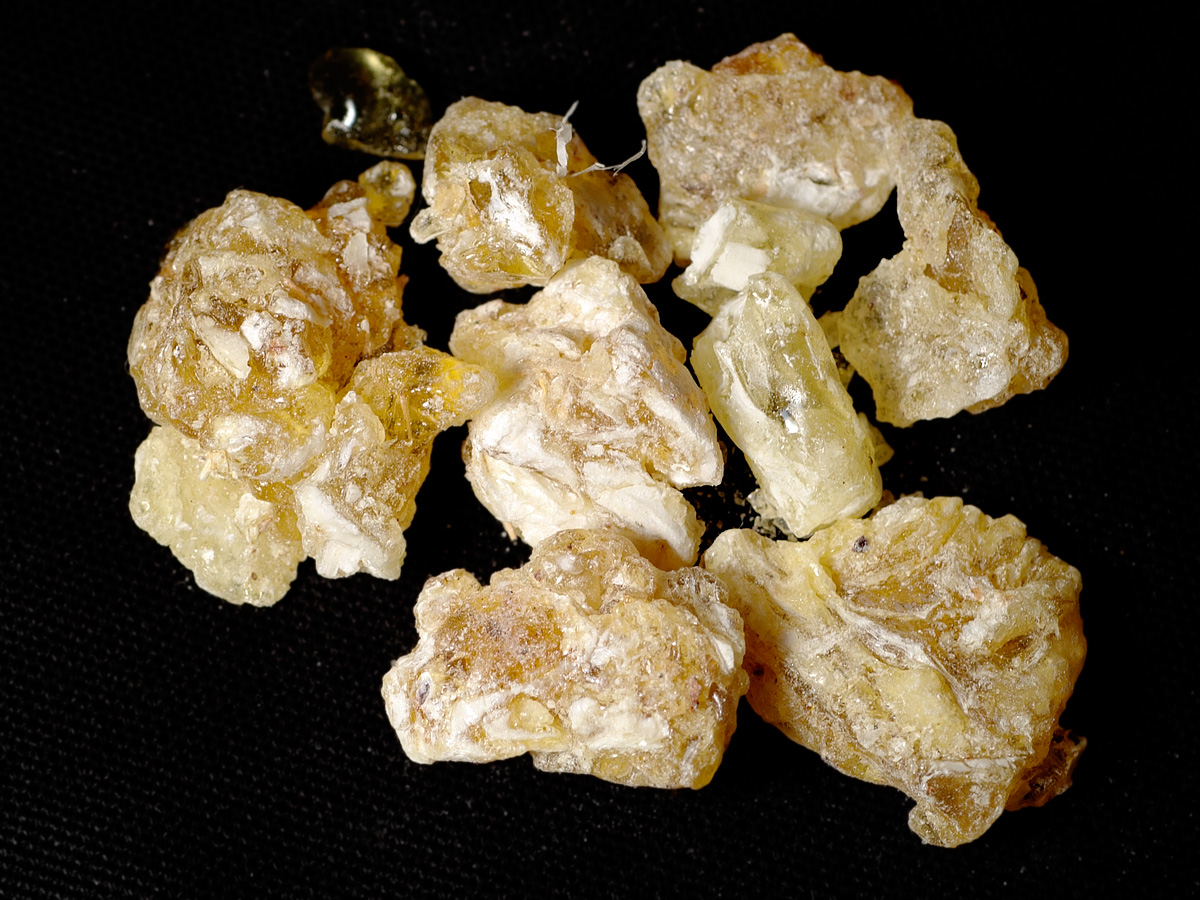
Lumps of dried frankincense resin

IINRG has brought out several publications of which some of the notable ones are:

- Ghosal, S (2009). "Effect of different pruning times of ber (Zizyphus mauritiana) in relation to aghani lac yield Environment and Ecology". Environment and Ecology. Indian Institute of Natural Resins and Gums. ISSN 0970-0420.
- Singh, B.P.; Ghosal, S.; Singh, A.K.; Mishra, Y.D. (2008). Weeds of rainy season in plantations of five lac host species Indian Journal of Weed Science. Indian Institute of Natural Resins and Gums. Archived from the original on 2014-07-14.
- Ghosal, S; Mishra, Y. D. (2009). "Canopy structure of ber (Zizyphus mauritiana) trees influencing lac yield Environment and Ecology". Environment and Ecology. Indian Institute of Natural Resins and Gums. ISSN 0970-0420.
- Ghosal, S.; Ramani R.; Mishra YD (2012). Influence of thickness of branch, phunki scrap weight, weighted living cell and kusmi encrustation thickness on broodlac quality. Indian Institute of Natural Resins and Gums. Archived from the original on 2014-07-14.
- Ghosal S. (2012). Kusmi lac yield in winter season as affected by weather and directional effect on ber (Zizyphus mauritiana) trees. Indian Institute of Natural Resins and Gums. Archived from the original on 2014-07-14.
- Singh, B.P., Ghosal S. and Singh A.K. (2011). Effect of different herbicides on weed, lac insect and lac yield in Flemingia semialata plantation Indian Journal of Weed Science. Indian Institute of Natural Resins and Gums. Archived from the original on 2014-07-14.
- Ghosal S (2012). Effect of weather and application of primary nutrients and liming to ber (Ziziphus mauritiana) on winter season (aghani) kusmi lac production. Indian Institute of Natural Resins and Gums. Archived from the original on 2014-07-14.
- Ghosal S, Ramani R, Monobrullah M, Singh JP (2010). Lac encrustation thickness in relation to spray of Bacillus thuringiensis var kurstaki. Indian Institute of Natural Resins and Gums. Archived from the original on 2014-07-14.
- Ghosal S, Singh JP (2010). Settlement pattern of rangeeni form of lac insect Kerria lacca as influenced by location of broodlac placement. Indian Institute of Natural Resins and Gums. Archived from the original on 2014-07-14.
- Giri SK, Ansari MF, Baboo B (2010). Effect of storage methods on quality of lac - a natural resin. Indian Institute of Natural Resins and Gums. Archived from the original on 2014-07-14.
- Mishra YD; Baboo B; Singh HS; Sisodiya SP; Singh RK; Amin AJ. (2010). Kusmi lac cultivation on Prosopis juliflora (ganda bawel), a derided weed in Gujarat. Indian Institute of Natural Resins and Gums. Archived from the original on 2014-07-14.
- Pal G, Bhagat ML, Bhattacharya A (2009). Economics and resource use efficiency of lac cultivation in Jharkhand. Indian Institute of Natural Resins and Gums. Archived from the original on 2014-07-14.
- Pal G, Jaiswal AK, Bhattacharya A (2009). An analysis of price spread in marketing of lac in Madhya Pradesh. Indian Institute of Natural Resins and Gums. Archived from the original on 2014-07-14.
- Pal G. (2010). Growth and Instability in production and export of Indian lac. Indian Institute of Natural Resins and Gums. Archived from the original on 2014-07-14.
- Pal G (2010). An economic analysis of lac marketing in Kanker District of Chhattisgarh. Indian Institute of Natural Resins and Gums. Archived from the original on 2014-07-14.
- Pal G, Jaiswal AK, Bhattacharya A (2010). An analysis of trend and variation in prices of lac at different levels of market in West Bengal. Indian Institute of Natural Resins and Gums. Archived from the original on 2014-07-14.
- Pal G, Jaiswal AK, Bhattacharya A (2010). Estimation of lac production and processing in India. Indian Institute of Natural Resins and Gums. Archived from the original on 2014-07-14.
- Patil PM, Ansari MF, Prasad KM (2010). Effect of urea and thio-urea on the performance of water soluble lac varnishes. Indian Institute of Natural Resins and Gums. Archived from the original on 2014-07-14.
- Prasad N, Giri SK (2010). Harvesting/tapping techniques for production of natural resins and oleo-resins - A Review. Indian Institute of Natural Resins and Gums. Archived from the original on 2014-07-14.
- Singh BP, Ghosal S, Singh AK, Mishra YD (2008). Weeds of rainy season in plantations of five lac host species. Indian Institute of Natural Resins and Gums. Archived from the original on 2014-07-14.
- Singh BP, Mishra YD, Yadav SK (2008). Effect of intercropping of vegetable crops on growth of Flemingia semialata Roxb. and lac yield under irrigated conditions. Indian Institute of Natural Resins and Gums. Archived from the original on 2014-07-14.
- Singh RK; Mishra YD; Baboo B. (2010). Impact of pitcher irrigation and mulching on the summer season (jethwi) lac crop sustainability and pruning response on ber (Ziziphus mauritiana). Indian Institute of Natural Resins and Gums. Archived from the original on 2014-07-14.
- Srivastava S, Ray DP (2009). Mosquito (Anopheles stephensi) larvicidal activity of essential oils of curry leaf (Murraya koenigii (L.) Spreng.). Indian Institute of Natural Resins and Gums. Archived from the original on 2014-07-14.

Ebooks on Natural Resins & Gums

- Natural Resins & Gums of commercial importance - At a glance
- Descriptors of lac insect with special reference to Kerria Spp.
- Lac Culture Operations
- Physico-chemical properties of some Indian plant gums of commercial importance

== See also ==
- Agroecological restoration
- Agroecosystem
- Agroecosystem analysis
- Ecology
- Organic agriculture
