= Intensive farming =

Branch of agriculture

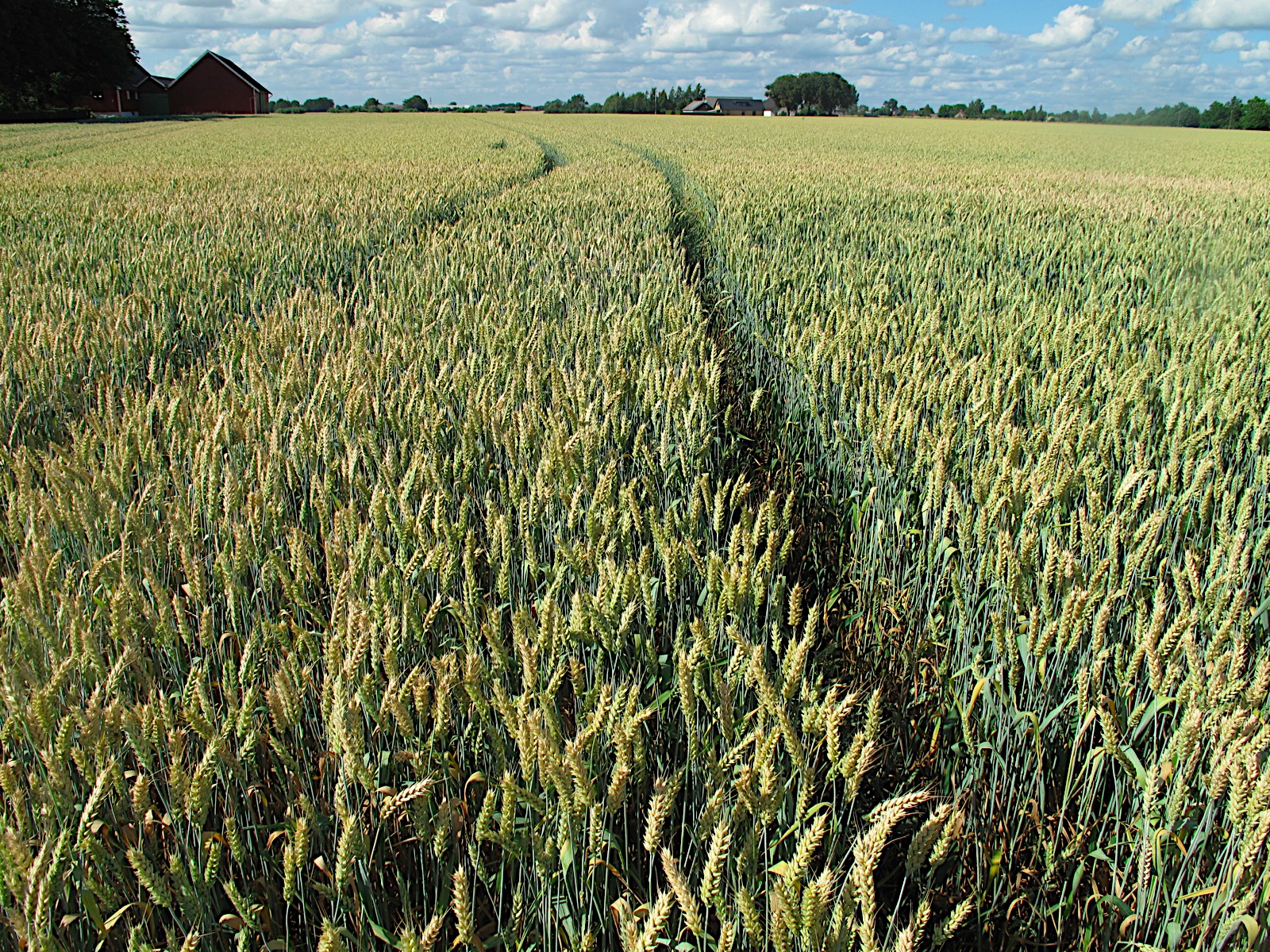
Intensive farming of wheat in Lund, Sweden

Intensive agriculture, also known as intensive farming (as opposed to extensive farming), or conventional agriculture, is a type of agriculture, both of crop plants and of animals, with higher levels of input and output per unit of agricultural land area. It is characterized by a low fallow ratio, higher use of inputs such as capital, labour, agrochemicals and water, and higher crop yields per unit land area.

Most commercial agriculture is intensive in one or more ways. Forms that rely heavily on industrial methods are often called industrial agriculture, which is characterized by technologies designed to increase yield. Techniques include planting multiple crops per year, reducing the frequency of fallow years, improving cultivars, mechanised agriculture, controlled by increased and more detailed analysis of growing conditions, including weather, soil, water, weeds, and pests. Modern methods frequently involve increased use of non-biotic inputs, such as fertilizers, plant growth regulators, pesticides, and antibiotics for livestock. Intensive farms are widespread in developed nations and increasingly prevalent worldwide. Most of the meat, dairy products, eggs, fruits, and vegetables available in supermarkets are produced by such farms.

Some intensive farms can use sustainable methods, although this typically necessitates higher inputs of labor or lower yields. Sustainably increasing agricultural productivity, especially on smallholdings, is an important way to decrease the amount of land needed for farming and slow and reverse environmental degradation caused by processes such as deforestation.

Intensive animal farming involves large numbers of animals raised on a relatively small area of land, for example by rotational grazing, or sometimes as concentrated animal feeding operations. These methods increase the yields of food and fiber per unit land area compared to those of extensive animal husbandry; concentrated feed is brought to seldom-moved animals, or, with rotational grazing, the animals are repeatedly moved to fresh forage.

== History ==
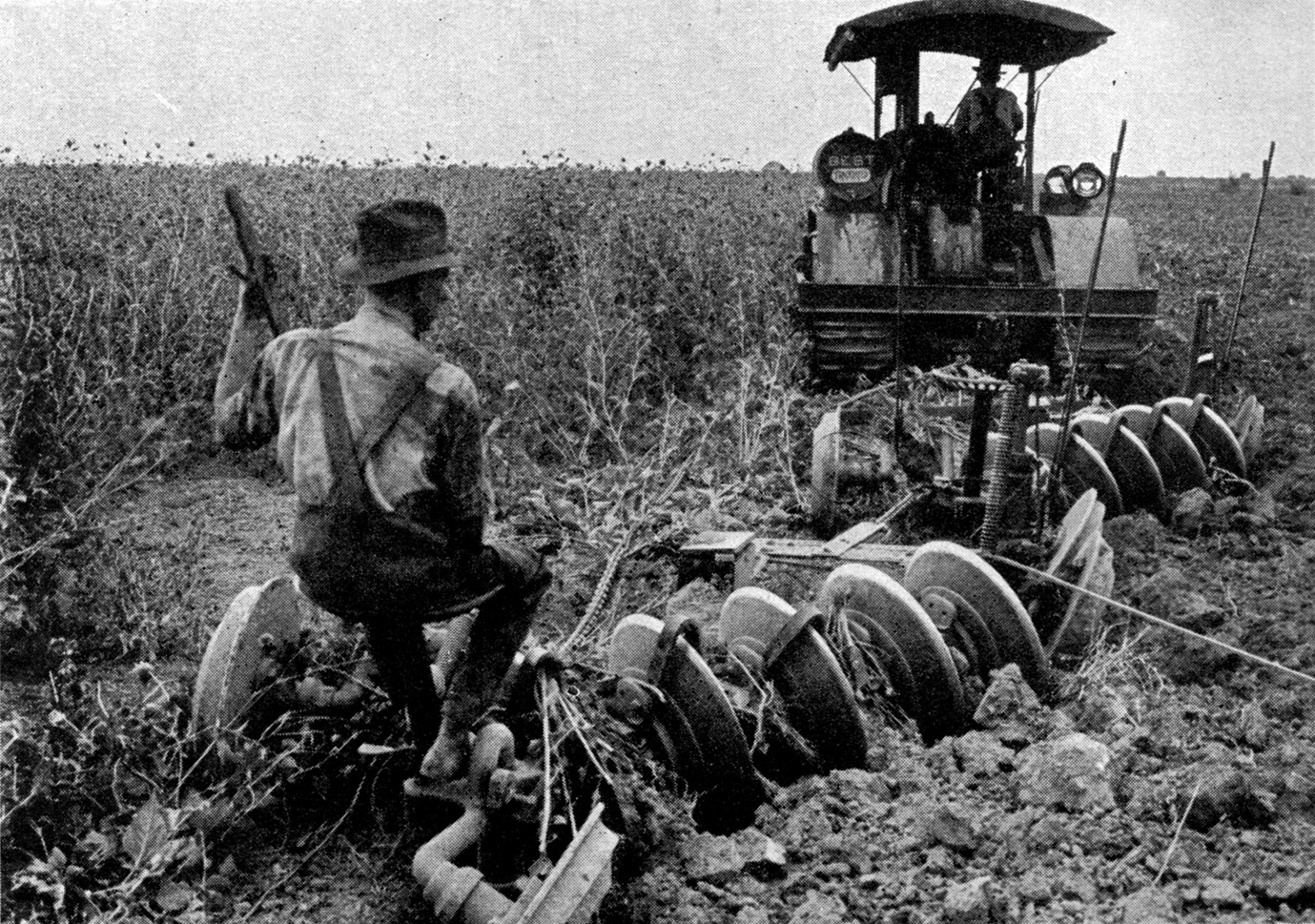
Early 20th-century image of a tractor ploughing an alfalfa field

Agricultural development in Britain between the 16th century and the mid-19th century saw a massive increase in agricultural productivity and net output. This in turn contributed to unprecedented population growth, freeing up a significant percentage of the workforce, and thereby helped enable the Industrial Revolution. Historians cited enclosure, mechanization, four-field crop rotation, and selective breeding as the most important innovations.

Industrial agriculture arose in the Industrial Revolution. By the early 19th century, agricultural techniques, implements, seed stocks, and cultivars had so improved that yield per land unit was many times that seen in the Middle Ages.

The first phase involved a continuing process of mechanization. Horse-drawn machinery such as the McCormick reaper revolutionized harvesting, while inventions such as the cotton gin reduced the cost of processing. During this same period, farmers began to use steam-powered threshers and tractors. In 1892, the first gasoline-powered tractor was successfully developed, and in 1923, the International Harvester Farmall tractor became the first all-purpose tractor, marking an inflection point in the replacement of draft animals with machines. Mechanical harvesters (combines), planters, transplanters, and other equipment were then developed, further revolutionizing agriculture. These inventions increased yields and allowed individual farmers to manage increasingly large farms.

The identification of nitrogen, phosphorus, and potassium (NPK) as critical factors in plant growth led to the manufacture of synthetic fertilizers, further increasing crop yields. In 1909, the Haber-Bosch method to synthesize ammonium nitrate was first demonstrated. NPK fertilizers stimulated the first concerns about industrial agriculture, due to concerns that they came with side effects such as soil compaction, soil erosion, and declines in overall soil fertility, along with health concerns about toxic chemicals entering the food supply.

The discovery of vitamins and their role in nutrition, in the first two decades of the 20th century, led to vitamin supplements, which in the 1920s allowed some livestock to be raised indoors, reducing their exposure to adverse natural elements.

Following World War II synthetic fertilizer use increased rapidly.

The discovery of antibiotics and vaccines facilitated raising livestock by reducing diseases. Developments in logistics and refrigeration as well as processing technology made long-distance distribution feasible. Integrated pest management is the modern method to minimize pesticide use to more sustainable levels.

There are concerns over the sustainability of industrial agriculture, and the environmental effects of fertilizers and pesticides, which has given rise to the organic movement and has built a market for sustainable intensive farming, as well as funding for the development of appropriate technology.

== Techniques and technologies ==
=== Livestock ===
==== Pasture intensification ====
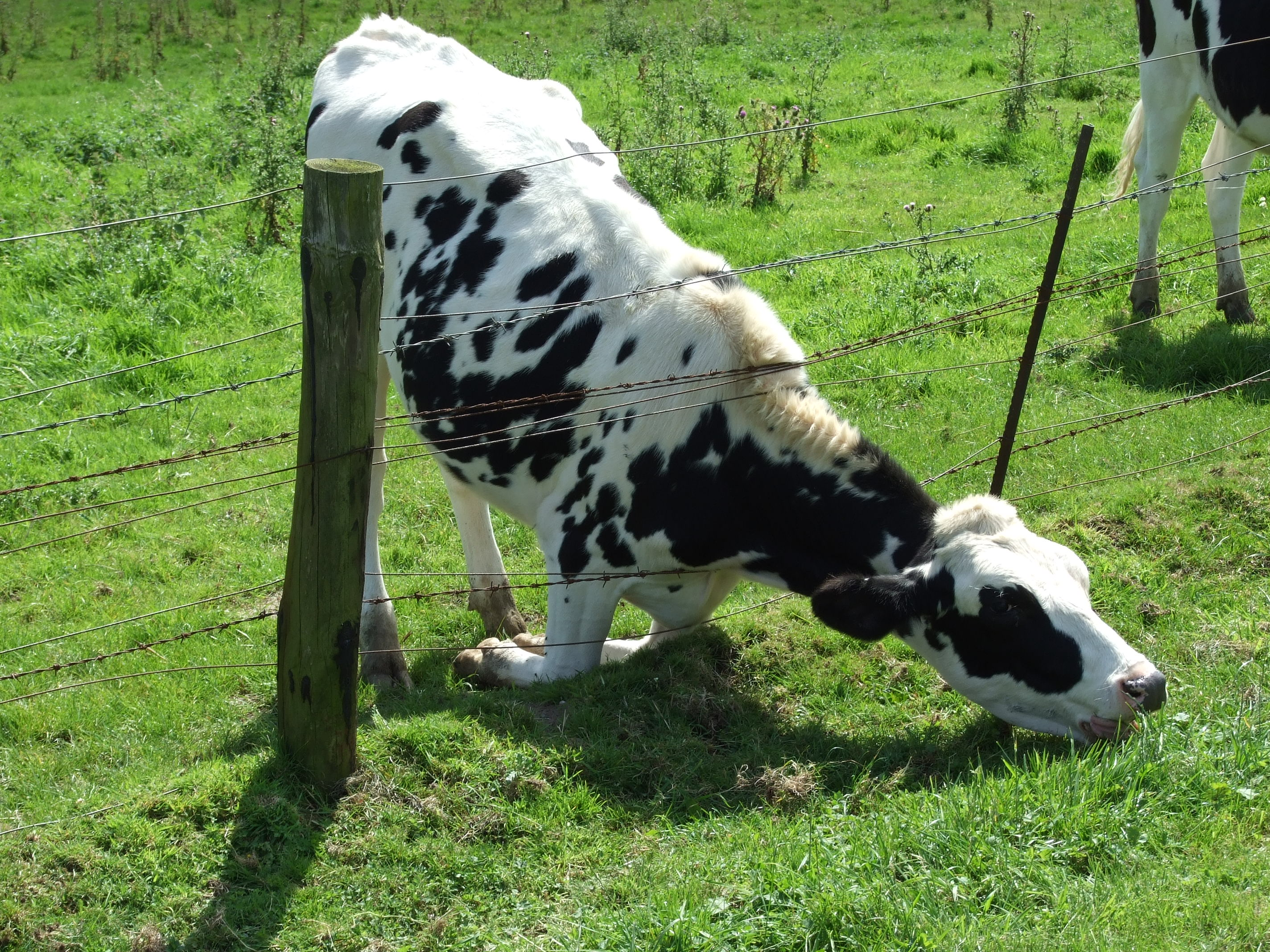
Cow in enclosed pasture eating grass through wire fence

Pasture intensification is the improvement of pasture soils and grasses to increase the food production potential of livestock systems. It is commonly used to reverse pasture degradation, a process characterized by loss of forage and decreased animal carrying capacity which results from overgrazing, poor nutrient management, and lack of soil conservation. This degradation leads to poor pasture soils with decreased fertility and water availability and increased rates of erosion, compaction, and acidification. Degraded pastures have significantly lower productivity and higher carbon footprints compared to intensified pastures.

Management practices which improve soil health and consequently grass productivity include irrigation, soil scarification, and the application of lime, fertilizers, and pesticides. Depending on the productivity goals of the target agricultural system, more involved restoration projects can be undertaken to replace invasive and under-productive grasses with grass species that are better suited to the soil and climate conditions of the region. These intensified grass systems allow higher stocking rates with faster animal weight gain and reduced time to slaughter, resulting in more productive, carbon-efficient livestock systems.

Another technique to optimize yield while maintaining the carbon balance is the use of integrated crop-livestock (ICL) and crop-livestock-forestry (ICLF) systems, which combine several ecosystems into one optimized agricultural framework. Correctly performed, such production systems are able to create synergies potentially providing benefits to pastures through optimal plant usage, improved feed and fattening rates, increased soil fertility and quality, intensified nutrient cycling, integrated pest control, and improved biodiversity. The introduction of certain legume crops to pastures can increase carbon accumulation and nitrogen fixation in soils, while their digestibility helps animal fattening and reduces methane emissions from enteric fermentation. ICLF systems yield beef cattle productivity up to ten times that of degraded pastures; additional crop production from maize, sorghum, and soybean harvests; and greatly reduced greenhouse gas balances due to forest carbon sequestration.

In the Twelve Aprils grazing program for dairy production, developed by the USDA-SARE, forage crops for dairy herds are planted into a perennial pasture.

==== Rotational grazing ====
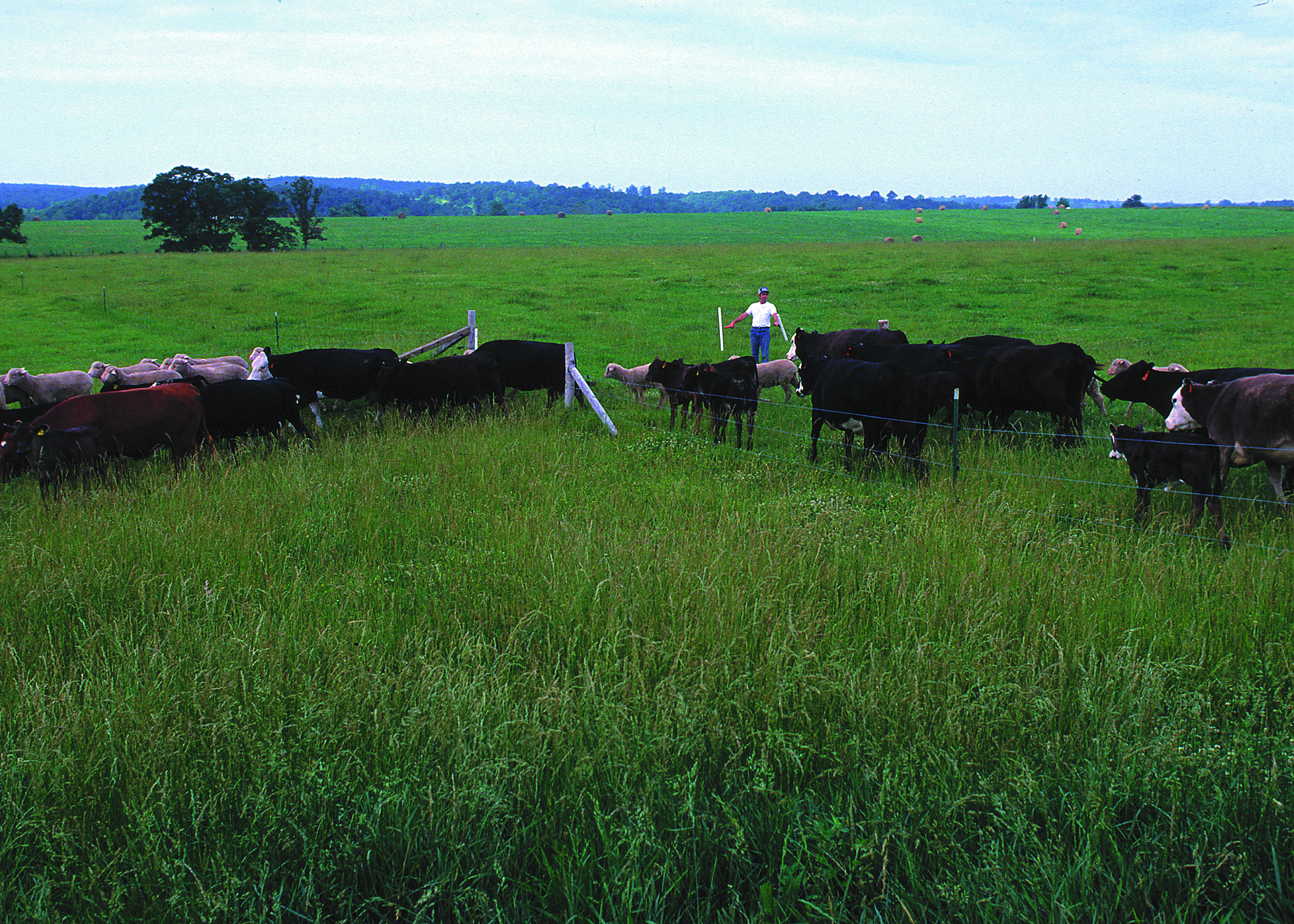
Rotational grazing of cattle and sheep in Missouri with pasture divided into paddocks, each grazed in turn for a short period and then rested

Rotational grazing is a variety of foraging in which herds or flocks are regularly and systematically moved to fresh, rested grazing areas (sometimes called paddocks) to maximize the quality and quantity of forage growth. It can be used with cattle, sheep, goats, pigs, chickens, turkeys, ducks, and other animals. The herds graze one portion of pasture, or a paddock, while allowing the others to recover. Resting grazed lands allows the vegetation to renew energy reserves, rebuild shoot systems, and deepen root systems, resulting in long-term maximum biomass production. Pasture systems alone can allow grazers to meet their energy requirements, but rotational grazing is especially effective because grazers thrive on the more tender younger plant stems. Parasites are also left behind to die off, minimizing or eliminating the need for de-wormers. With the increased productivity of rotational systems, the animals may need less supplemental feed than in continuous grazing systems. Farmers can therefore increase stocking rates.

==== Concentrated animal feeding operations ====
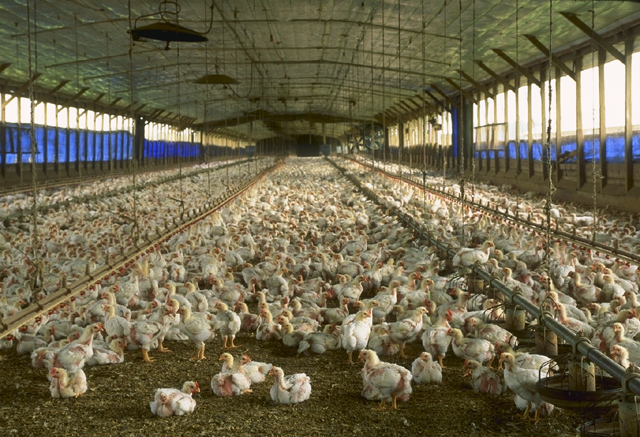
A commercial chicken house raising broiler pullets for meat

Intensive livestock farming or "factory farming", is the process of raising livestock in confinement at high stocking density. "Concentrated animal feeding operations" (CAFO), or "intensive livestock operations", can hold large numbers (some up to hundreds of thousands) of cows, hogs, turkeys, or chickens, often indoors. The essence of such farms is the concentration of livestock in a given space. The aim is to provide maximum output at the lowest possible cost and with the greatest level of food safety. The term is often used pejoratively. CAFOs have dramatically increased the production of food from animal husbandry worldwide, both in terms of total food produced and efficiency.

Food and water is delivered to the animals, and therapeutic use of antimicrobial agents, vitamin supplements, and growth hormones are often employed. Growth hormones are not used on chickens nor on any animal in the European Union. Undesirable behaviors often related to the stress of confinement led to a search for docile breeds (e.g., with natural dominant behaviors bred out), physical restraints to stop interaction, such as individual cages for chickens, or physical modification such as the debeaking of chickens to reduce the harm of fighting.

The CAFO designation resulted from the 1972 U.S. Federal Clean Water Act, which was enacted to protect and restore lakes and rivers to a "fishable, swimmable" quality. The United States Environmental Protection Agency identified certain animal feeding operations, along with many other types of industry, as "point source" groundwater polluters. These operations were subjected to regulation.

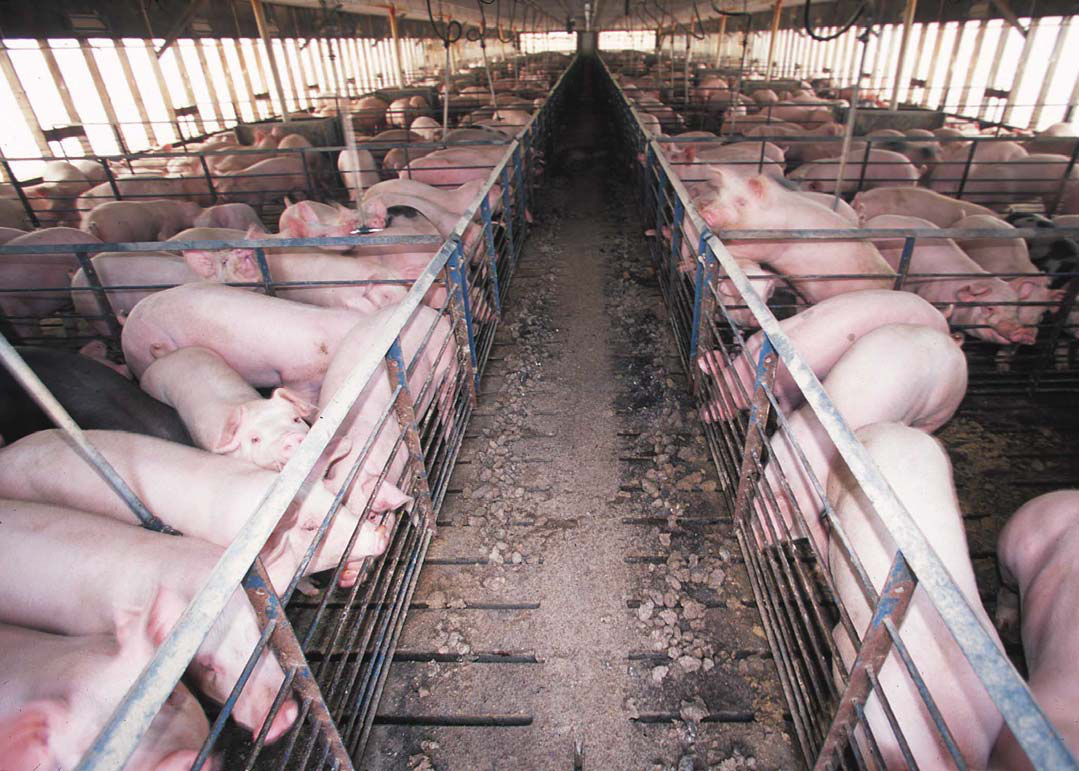
Intensively farmed pigs

In 17 states in the U.S., isolated cases of groundwater contamination were linked to CAFOs. The U.S. federal government acknowledges the waste disposal issue and requires that animal waste be stored in lagoons. These lagoons can be as large as 7.5 acres (30,000 m^{2}). Lagoons not protected with an impermeable liner can leak into groundwater under some conditions, as can runoff from manure used as fertilizer. A lagoon that burst in 1995 released 25 million gallons of nitrous sludge in North Carolina's New River. The spill allegedly killed eight to ten million fish.

The large concentration of animals, animal waste, and dead animals in a small space poses ethical issues to some consumers. Animal rights and animal welfare activists have charged that intensive animal rearing is cruel to animals.

=== Crops ===
The Green Revolution transformed farming in many developing countries. It spread technologies that had already existed, but had not been widely used outside of industrialized nations. These technologies included "miracle seeds", pesticides, irrigation, and synthetic nitrogen fertilizer.

==== Seeds ====
In the 1970s, scientists created high-yielding varieties of maize, wheat, and rice. These have an increased nitrogen-absorbing potential compared to other varieties. Since cereals that absorbed extra nitrogen would typically lodge (fall over) before harvest, semi-dwarfing genes were bred into their genomes. Norin 10 wheat, a variety developed by Orville Vogel from Japanese dwarf wheat varieties, was instrumental in developing wheat cultivars. IR8, the first widely implemented high-yielding rice to be developed by the International Rice Research Institute, was created through a cross between an Indonesian variety named "Peta" and a Chinese variety named "Dee Geo Woo Gen".

With the availability of molecular genetics in Arabidopsis and rice the mutant genes responsible (reduced height (rht), gibberellin insensitive (gai1) and slender rice (slr1)) have been cloned and identified as cellular signalling components of gibberellic acid, a phytohormone involved in regulating stem growth via its effect on cell division. Photosynthate investment in the stem is reduced dramatically in shorter plants and nutrients become redirected to grain production, amplifying in particular the yield effect of chemical fertilizers.

High-yielding varieties outperformed traditional varieties several fold and responded better to the addition of irrigation, pesticides, and fertilizers. Hybrid vigour is utilized in many important crops to greatly increase yields for farmers. However, the advantage is lost for the progeny of the F1 hybrids, meaning seeds for annual crops need to be purchased every season, thus increasing costs and profits for farmers.

==== Crop rotation ====
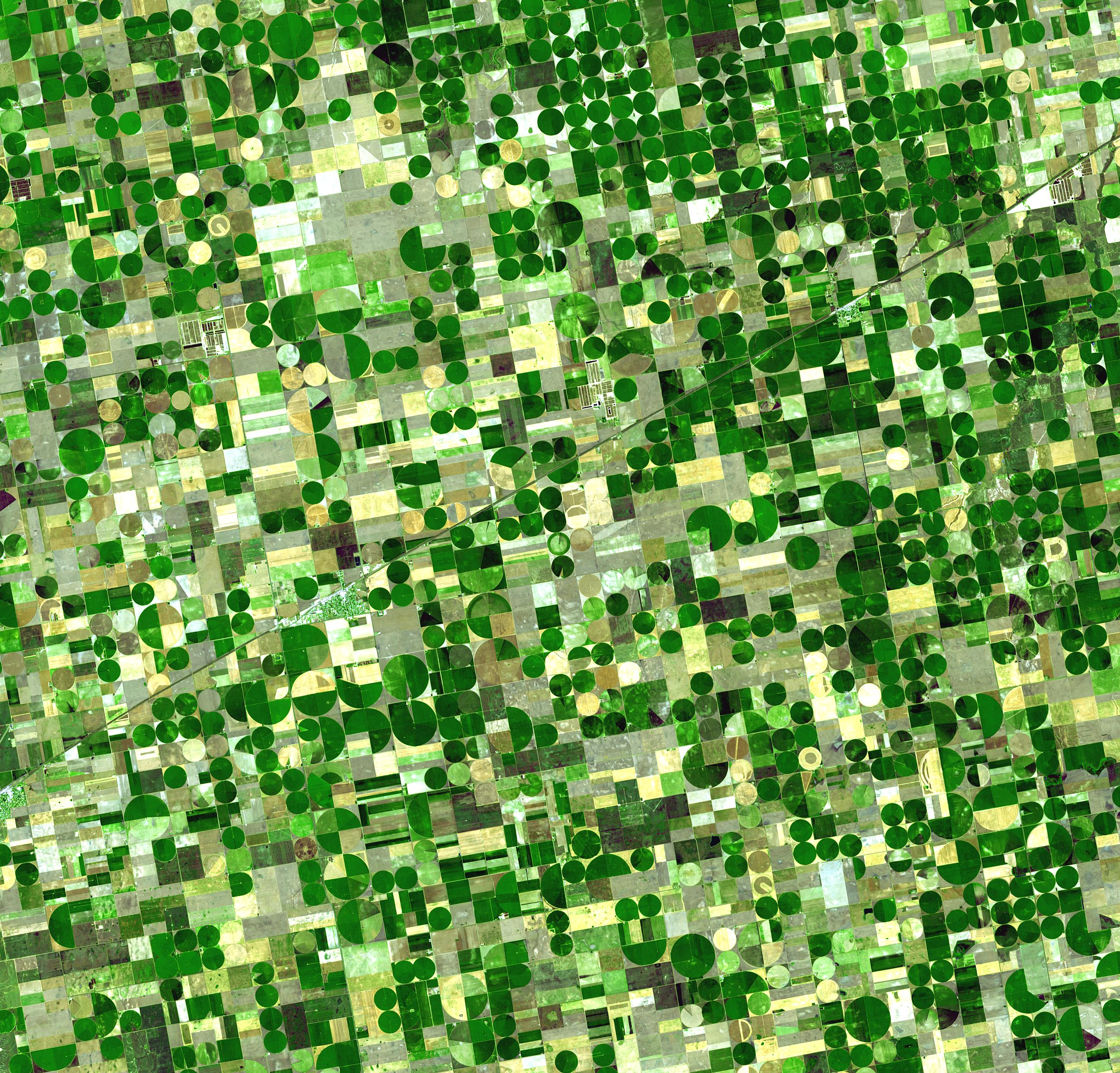
Satellite image of circular crop fields in Haskell County, Kansas, in late June 2001. Healthy, growing crops of corn and sorghum are green (sorghum may be slightly paler). Wheat is brilliant gold. Fields of brown have been recently harvested and plowed under or have lain in fallow for the year.

Crop rotation or crop sequencing is the practice of growing a series of dissimilar types of crops in the same space in sequential seasons for benefits such as avoiding pathogen and pest buildup that occurs when one species is continuously cropped. Crop rotation also seeks to balance the nutrient demands of various crops to avoid soil nutrient depletion. A traditional component of crop rotation is the replenishment of nitrogen through the use of legumes and green manure in sequence with cereals and other crops. Crop rotation can also improve soil structure and fertility by alternating deep-rooted and shallow-rooted plants. A related technique is to plant multi-species cover crops between commercial crops. This combines the advantages of intensive farming with continuous cover and polyculture.

==== Irrigation ====
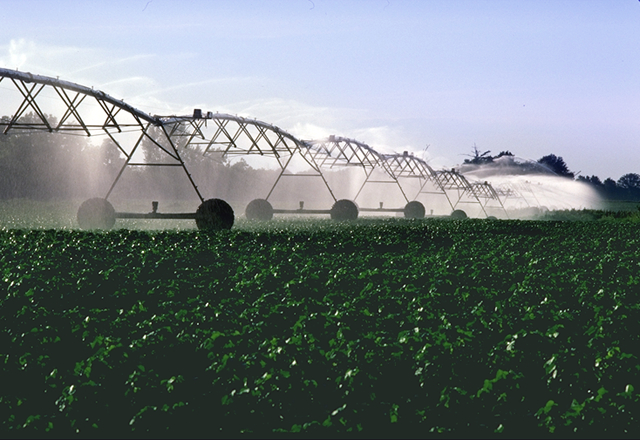
Overhead irrigation, center-pivot design

Crop irrigation accounts for 70% of the world's fresh water use. Flood irrigation, the oldest and most common type, is typically unevenly distributed, as parts of a field may receive excess water in order to deliver sufficient quantities to other parts. Overhead irrigation, using center-pivot or lateral-moving sprinklers, gives a much more equal and controlled distribution pattern. Drip irrigation is the most expensive and least-used type, but delivers water to plant roots with minimal losses.

Water catchment management measures include recharge pits, which capture rainwater and runoff and use it to recharge groundwater supplies. This helps in the replenishment of groundwater wells and eventually reduces soil erosion. Dammed rivers creating reservoirs store water for irrigation and other uses over large areas. Smaller areas sometimes use irrigation ponds or groundwater.

==== Weed control ====
In agriculture, systematic weed management is usually required, often performed by machines such as cultivators or liquid herbicide sprayers. Herbicides kill specific targets while leaving the crop relatively unharmed. Some of these act by interfering with the growth of the weed and are often based on plant hormones. Weed control through herbicide is made more difficult when the weeds become resistant to the herbicide. Solutions include:

- Cover crops (especially those with allelopathic properties) that out-compete weeds or inhibit their regeneration
- Multiple herbicides, in combination or in rotation
- Strains genetically engineered for herbicide tolerance
- Locally adapted strains that tolerate or out-compete weeds
- Tilling
- Ground cover such as mulch or plastic
- Manual removal
- Mowing
- Grazing
- Burning

==== Terracing ====
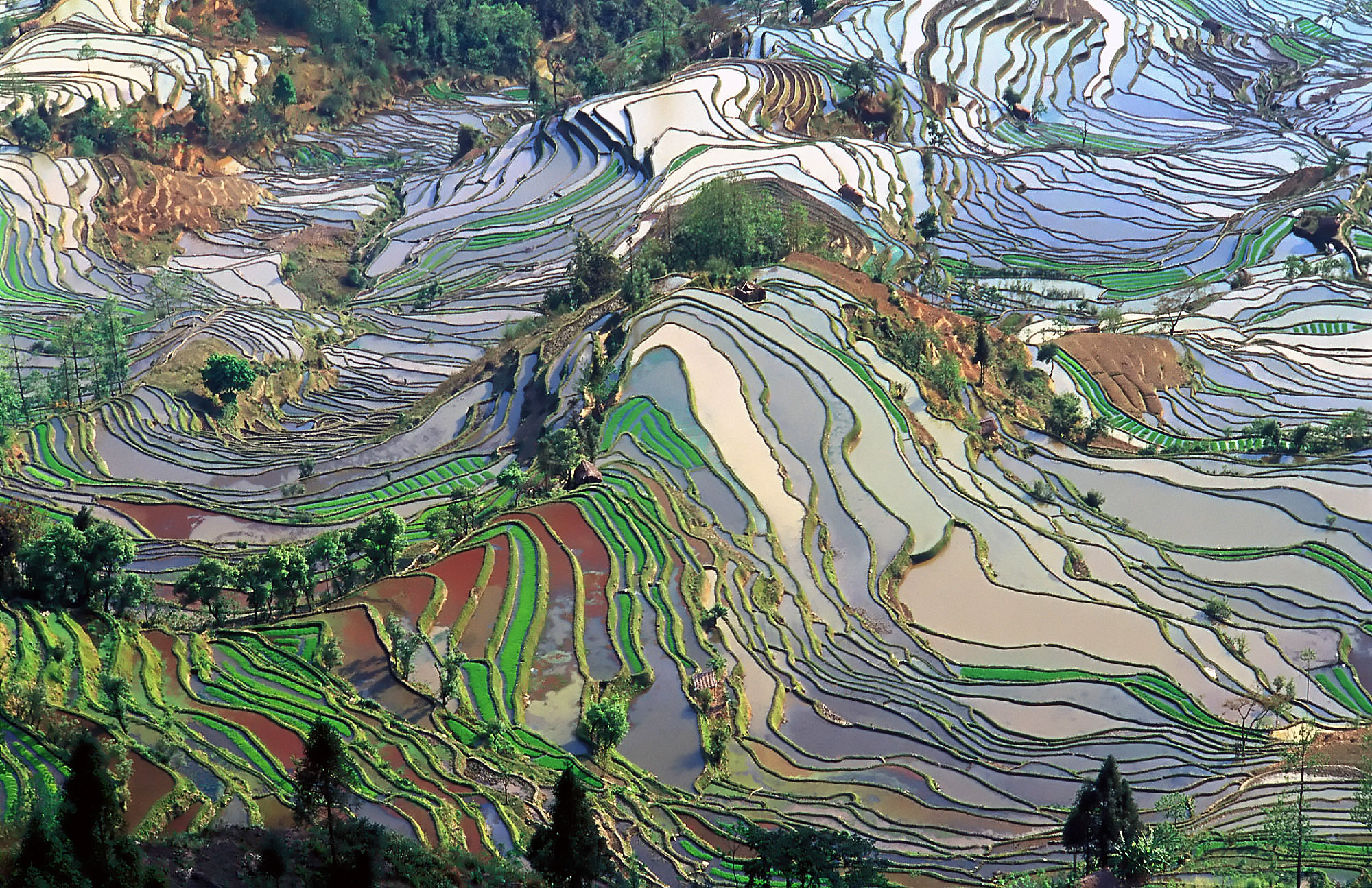
Terrace rice fields in Yunnan Province, China

In agriculture, a terrace is a leveled section of a hilly cultivated area, designed as a method of soil conservation to slow or prevent the rapid surface runoff of irrigation water. Often such land is formed into multiple terraces, giving a stepped appearance. The human landscapes of rice cultivation in terraces that follow the natural contours of the escarpments, like contour ploughing, are a classic feature of the island of Bali and the Banaue Rice Terraces in Banaue, Ifugao, Philippines. In Peru, the Inca made use of otherwise unusable slopes by building drystone walls to create terraces known as Andéns.

==== Rice paddies ====
A paddy field is a flooded parcel of arable land used for growing rice and other semiaquatic crops. Paddy fields are a typical feature of rice-growing countries of east and southeast Asia, including Malaysia, China, Sri Lanka, Myanmar, Thailand, Korea, Japan, Vietnam, Taiwan, Indonesia, India, and the Philippines. They are also found in other rice-growing regions such as Piedmont (Italy), the Camargue (France), and the Artibonite Valley (Haiti). They can occur naturally along rivers or marshes, or can be constructed, even on hillsides. They require large water quantities for irrigation, much of it from flooding. It gives an environment favourable to the strain of rice being grown, and is hostile to many species of weeds. As the only draft animal species which is comfortable in wetlands, the water buffalo is in widespread use in Asian rice paddies.

A recent development in the intensive production of rice is the System of Rice Intensification. Developed in 1983 by the French Jesuit Father Henri de Laulanié in Madagascar, by 2013 the number of smallholder farmers using the system had grown to between 4 and 5 million.

=== Aquaculture ===
Aquaculture is the cultivation of the natural products of water (fish, shellfish, algae, seaweed, and other aquatic organisms). Intensive aquaculture takes place on land using tanks, ponds, or other controlled systems, or in the ocean, using cages.

=== Sustainability ===
Intensive farming practices which are thought to be sustainable have been developed to slow the deterioration of agricultural land and even regenerate soil health and ecosystem services. These developments may fall in the category of organic farming, or the integration of organic and conventional agriculture.

Pasture cropping involves planting grain crops directly into grassland without first applying herbicides. The perennial grasses form a living mulch understory to the grain crop, eliminating the need to plant cover crops after harvest. The pasture is intensively grazed both before and after grain production. This intensive system yields equivalent farmer profits (partly from increased livestock forage) while building new topsoil and sequestering up to 33 tons of CO_{2}/ha/year.

Biointensive agriculture focuses on maximizing efficiency such as per unit area, energy input and water input.

Agroforestry combines agriculture and orchard/forestry technologies to create more integrated, diverse, productive, profitable, healthy and sustainable land-use systems.

Intercropping can increase yields or reduce inputs and thus represents (potentially sustainable) agricultural intensification. However, while total yield per unit land area is often increased, yields of any single crop often decrease. There are also challenges to farmers who rely on farming equipment optimized for monoculture, often resulting in increased labor inputs.

Vertical farming is intensive crop production on a large scale in urban centers, in multi-story, artificially-lit structures, for the production of low-calorie foods like herbs, microgreens, and lettuce.

An integrated farming system is a progressive, sustainable agriculture system such as zero waste agriculture or integrated multi-trophic aquaculture, which involves the interactions of multiple species. Elements of this integration can include:

- Intentionally introducing flowering plants into agricultural ecosystems to increase pollen-and nectar-resources required by natural enemies of insect pests
- Using crop rotation and cover crops to suppress nematodes in potatoes
- Integrated multi-trophic aquaculture is a practice in which the by-products (wastes) from one species are recycled to become inputs (fertilizers, food) for another.

== Challenges ==
It is estimated that the world population will be 9.7 billion people by 2050, and the approximately 10.3 billion people when the global population is projected to peak around 2085. The conditions under which this food production takes place will determine the associated environmental, social and economic costs. However, the potential for agricultural expansion is limited, as further land conversion to cropland would have impacts on other ecosystems and their services, including forests, grasslands and wetlands.

=== Environmental impact ===
Industrial agriculture uses huge amounts of water, energy, and industrial chemicals, increasing pollution in the arable land, usable water, and atmosphere. Herbicides, insecticides, and fertilizers accumulate in ground and surface waters. Industrial agricultural practices are one of the main drivers of global warming, accounting for 14–28% of net greenhouse gas emissions.

Many of the negative effects of industrial agriculture may emerge at some distance from fields and farms. Nitrogen compounds from the Midwest, for example, travel down the Mississippi to degrade coastal fisheries in the Gulf of Mexico, causing so-called oceanic dead zones.

Many wild plant and animal species have become extinct on a regional or national scale, and the functioning of agro-ecosystems has been profoundly altered. Agricultural intensification includes a variety of factors, including the loss of landscape elements, increased farm and field sizes, and increase usage of insecticides and herbicides. The large scale of insecticides and herbicides lead to the rapid developing resistance among pests renders herbicides and insecticides increasingly ineffective. Agrochemicals have may be involved in colony collapse disorder, in which the individual members of bee colonies disappear. (Agricultural production is highly dependent on bees to pollinate many varieties of fruits and vegetables.)

Intensive farming creates conditions for parasite growth and transmission that are vastly different from what parasites encounter in natural host populations, potentially altering selection on a variety of traits such as life-history traits and virulence. Some recent epidemic outbreaks have highlighted the association with intensive agricultural farming practices. For example the infectious salmon anaemia (ISA) virus is causing significant economic loss for salmon farms. The ISA virus is an orthomyxovirus with two distinct clades, one European and one North American, that diverged before 1900 (Krossøy et al. 2001). This divergence suggests that an ancestral form of the virus was present in wild salmonids prior to the introduction of cage-cultured salmonids. As the virus spread from vertical transmission (parent to offspring).

Intensive monoculture increases the risk of failures due to pests, adverse weather and disease.

=== Social impact ===
A study for the U.S. Office of Technology Assessment concluded that regarding industrial agriculture, there is a "negative relationship between the trend toward increasing farm size and the social conditions in rural communities" on a "statistical level". Agricultural monoculture can entail social and economic risks.

== See also ==
- Convertible husbandry
- Dryland farming
- Environmental impact of agriculture
- Green Revolution
- Industrial crop
- Pekarangan
- Small-scale agriculture
- Intensive animal farming

== Sources ==
This article incorporates text from a free content work. Licensed under CC BY 4.0 (license statement/permission). Text taken from The State of the World’s Land and Water Resources for Food and Agriculture 2025, Food and Agriculture Organization of the United Nations (FAO).
