= Agroecosystem =

Ecosystems supporting food production

Agroecosystem in Croton-on-Hudson, New York in Westchester County. Intercropped tomatoes, basil, peppers and eggplants.

Agroecosystems, or cultivated ecosystem, are natural ecosystems that have been modified and is managed by humans for the purposes of agricultural production, whether plant or animal. As the name implies, at the core of an agroecosystem lies the human activity of agriculture. As such they are the basic unit of study in Agroecology, and Regenerative Agriculture using ecological approaches.

Like other ecosystems, agroecosystems consists of the physical environment (soil, water, climate), living organisms (crops, animals, micro-organisms and wildlife) and the ecological interactions that link them. They are somewhat arbitrarily defined as a spatially and functionally coherent unit of agricultural activity.

An agroecosystem can be seen as not restricted to the immediate site of agricultural activity (e.g. the farm). That is, it includes the region that is impacted by this activity, usually by changes to the complexity of species assemblages and energy flows, as well as to the net nutrient balance. Agroecosystems, particularly those managed intensively, are characterized as having simpler species composition, energy and nutrient flows than "natural" ecosystems. Likewise, agroecosystems are often associated with elevated nutrient input, much of which exits the farm leading to eutrophication of connected ecosystems not directly engaged in agriculture. On the other hand, an increased plant diversity in sustainable agroecosystems provides a range of benefits, both ecologically and economically.

== Utilization ==
Forest gardens are probably the world's oldest and most resilient agroecosystem.

Some major organizations are hailing farming within agroecosystems as the way forward for mainstream agriculture. Current farming methods have resulted in over-stretched water resources, high levels of erosion and reduced soil fertility. According to a report by the International Water Management Institute and the United Nations Environment Programme, there is not enough water to continue farming using current practices; therefore how critical water, land, and ecosystem resources are used to boost crop yields must be reconsidered. The report suggested assigning value to ecosystems, recognizing environmental and livelihood tradeoffs, and balancing the rights of a variety of users and interests, as well addressing inequities that sometimes result when such measures are adopted, such as the reallocation of water from poor to rich, the clearing of land to make way for more productive farmland, or the preservation of a wetland system that limits fishing rights.

One of the major efforts of disciplines such as agroecology is to promote management styles that blur the distinction between agroecosystems and "natural" ecosystems, both by decreasing the impact of agriculture (increasing the biological and trophic complexity of the agricultural system as well as decreasing the nutrient inputs/outflow) and by increasing awareness that "downstream" effects extend agroecosystems beyond the boundaries of the farm (e.g. the Corn Belt agroecosystem includes the hypoxic zone in the Gulf of Mexico). In the first case, polyculture or buffer strips for wildlife habitat can restore some complexity to a cropping system, while organic farming can reduce nutrient inputs. Efforts of the second type are most common at the watershed scale. An example is the National Association of Conservation Districts' Lake Mendota Watershed Project, which seeks to reduce runoff from the agricultural lands feeding into the lake with the aim of reducing algal blooms.

== See also ==
- Agriculture
- Agriculture in Concert with the Environment
- Agroecological restoration
- Agroecology
- Agroecosystem analysis
- Agrophysics
- Ecology of contexts
- Long-Term Agroecosystem Research Network
- Polyculture
