= Agroecosystem analysis =

Agroecosystem analysis is a thorough analysis of an agricultural environment which considers aspects from ecology, sociology, economics, and politics with equal weight. There are many aspects to consider; however, it is literally impossible to account for all of them.

In the past, an agroecosystem analysis approach might be used to determine the sustainability of an agricultural system. It has become apparent, however, that the "sustainability" of the system depends heavily on the definition of sustainability chosen by the observer. Therefore, agroecosystem analysis is used to bring the richness of the true complexity of agricultural systems to an analysis to identify reconfigurations of the system (or holon) that will best suit individual situations.

Agroecosystem analysis is a tool of the multidisciplinary subject known as Agroecology. Agroecology and agroecosystem analysis are not the same as sustainable agriculture, though the use of agroecosystem analysis may help a farming system ensure its viability. Agroecosystem analysis is not a new practice, agriculturalists and farmers have been doing it since societies switched from hunting and gathering (hunter-gatherer) for food to settling in one area. Every time a person involved in agriculture evaluates their situation to identify methods to make the system function in a way that better suits their interests, they are performing an agroecosystem analysis.

== Agroecosystem analysis and sustainable agriculture differ ==
It is difficult to discuss these differences without the aid of an example. Consider the case of a conventional (see conventional agriculture) apple farmer. This farmer may choose to change his farm to conform to the standards of USDA approved organic agriculture because he felt motivated by social or moral norms or the potential of increased profits or a host of other reasons. This farmer evaluated his situation and reconfigured it to try to improve it. Some might look at this situation and conclude that the apple farmer chose organic apple production because it is more sustainable for the environment. But, what if a few years later the farmer finds that he is struggling to make a profit and decides to go back to conventional agriculture? The farmer performed another agroecosystem analysis and arrived at a reconfiguration that some might see as unsustainable. This example illustrates how agroecosystem analysis is not required to lead a more environmentally sustainable form of agriculture. Agroecosystem analysis might produce a reconfiguration that is more economically sustainable or socially sustainable or politically sustainable for a farmer (or other actor). By definition, however, agroecosystem analysis is not required to produce an environmentally sustainable configuration for an agricultural system.

== Approach to analysis ==
William L. Bland, from the University of Wisconsin–Madison, developed the idea of a farm as a Holon (philosophy) This term, holon, was originally introduced by Arthur Koestler in 1966, in which he referred to a holon as an entity in which it is a part by itself, a holon, while contributing to a larger entity, which is also a holon. Bland develops this for an agricultural environment or farm as, "The farm holon is both the whole in which smaller holons exists, and a part of larger entities, themselves holons." This idea was expanded upon by Bland and Michael M. Bell University of Wisconsin–Madison in their 2007 article "A holon approach to agroecology," because it is difficult to account for boundary and change when using a systems thinking approach. One major difference between Koestler's holon and the holon idea developed for agroecosystem analysis is that the latter can only be defined as a holon if it has intentionality.

The farm itself is a holon and within the farm holon, other holons exist. For example, a farm animal, the farm family, and a farmworker can all be considered holons within the farm. Additionally, the farm is considered a holon which is in part connected to other holons such as the county in which the farm resides, the bank from which the farmer borrowed money, or the grain elevator where the farmer can sell goods. Things like the tractor or the barn are not holons because they lack intentionality.

When conducting an agroecosystem analysis, the analyst should approach the farm as the farm itself and the "ecology of contexts" in which the farm and the farmer function. A "context" is anything that might influence functioning of the farm and cause it to change. According to Bland and Bell, examples of contexts include, "family, farm business, genetic heart disease, and spiritual beliefs." These examples illustrate the breadth of contexts that could influence why farmers do what they do. Bland concluded his model of a farm as a holon by stating, "A farm is not sustainable (disintegrates) when it cannot find an overall configuration that is simultaneously viable in all contexts."

== Questions to consider ==
There is no right or wrong way to evaluate an agroecosystem. It is important to identify all actors in a holon before beginning the analysis. When an analyst accepts the task of analyzing the agroecosystem, first and foremost, it must be approached as to incorporate all elements involved and should derive questions that should be answered. Questions such as:

- What defining factors (holons and contexts) determine the present configuration of the agroecosystem?
- How does one quantify the sustainability of the farm holon (economic, social, political, ecological and/or other)?
- How does the farmer or farm family perceive an agroecosystem?
- What is the farmer doing now, and how do those practices or actions affect the viability of the agroecosystem?
- Can the farmer maintain his livelihood continuing with current practices?
- What does the farmer value and where do those values come from?
- Will the farmer consider alternative farm configurations?

These are the types of questions an analyst could consider. There are no preset questions to ask, and usually more questions are derived than answered. However, the most important task an analysts can do, is to start the analysis with an open mind and under no presumptions about what is and is not sustainable for the farm holon.

== Analysis types ==
J. Visser of Dordt College uses a diagram, "Wealth Creation Wheel" to emphasize and account for the parameters of developing a thorough analysis. His diagram is more emphasized on economics; however, it is a useful tool to reference when starting to analyze an agroecosystem. His interest is to create a functioning wheel which will roll when all parameters are met equally. If one parameter is not functioning in context with the other parameters, then the wheel will be out of balance and ineffective, thus unsustainable. When referring to an agroecosystem, if one parameter is out of balance, this could lead to an unproductive cropping season and loss of income and/or livelihood.
