= Integrated multi-trophic aquaculture =

Type of aquaculture

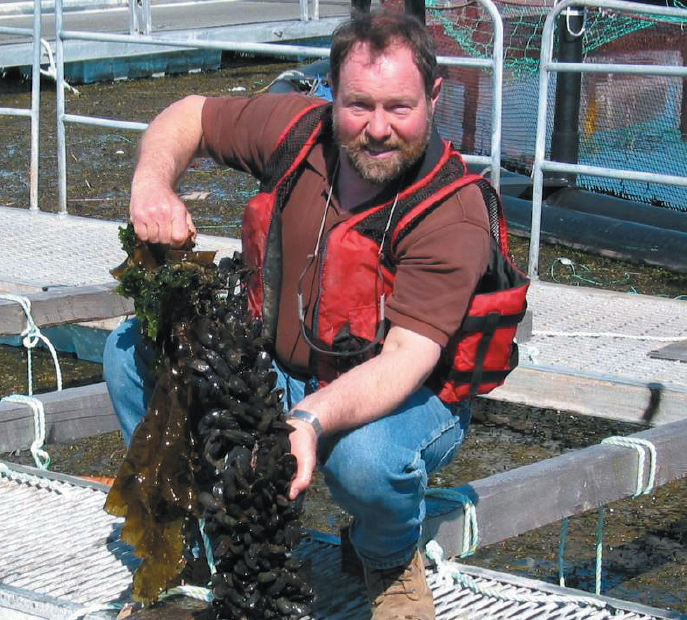
Blue mussels (Mytilus edulis) cultivated in proximity to Atlantic salmon (Salmo salar) in the Bay of Fundy, Canada. Note the salmon cage (polar circle) in the background.

Integrated multi-trophic aquaculture (IMTA) is a type of aquaculture where the byproducts, including waste, from one aquatic species are used as inputs (fertilizers, food) for another. Farmers combine fed aquaculture (e.g., fish, shrimp) with inorganic extractive (e.g., seaweed) and organic extractive (e.g., shellfish) aquaculture to create balanced systems for environment remediation (biomitigation), economic stability (improved output, lower cost, product diversification and risk reduction) and social acceptability (better management practices).

Selecting appropriate species and sizing the various populations to provide necessary ecosystem functions allows the biological and chemical processes involved to achieve a stable balance, mutually benefiting the organisms and improving ecosystem health.

Ideally, the co-cultured species each yield valuable commercial "crops". IMTA can synergistically increase total output, even if some of the crops yield less than they would, short-term, in a monoculture.

IMTA is also highly beneficial for reducing the environmental footprint of aquaculture. The growth of farmed Atlantic salmon (Salmo salar), provides insight to the rapid growth of aquaculture demand. Output growth rates averaged 25.6% from 1980 to 2004, with the economic value of farmed salmon output exceeding 4 billion U.S. dollars in 2004. IMTA works by creating a closed-loop system where the by-products such as excess nutrients and organic waste from fish farming, are utilized by other species such as shellfish and seaweed. This process can decrease water pollution, minimize the need for chemical fertilizers, and improve overall ecosystem health. Furthermore, by integrating different trophic levels, IMTA can enhance biodiversity and promote more sustainable practices in marine food production.

== Terminology and related approaches ==
"Integrated" refers to intensive and synergistic cultivation, using water-borne nutrient and energy transfer. "Multi-trophic" means that the various species occupy different trophic levels, i.e., different (but adjacent) links in the food chain.

IMTA is a specialized form of the age-old practice of aquatic polyculture, which was the co-culture of various species, often without regard to trophic level. In this broader case, the organisms may share biological and chemical processes that may be minimally complementary, potentially leading to reduced production of both species due to competition for the same food resource. However, some traditional systems such as polyculture of carps in China employ species that occupy multiple niches within the same pond, or the culture of fish that is integrated with a terrestrial agricultural species, can be considered forms of IMTA.

The more general term "Integrated Aquaculture" is used to describe the integration of monocultures through water transfer between the culture systems. The terms "IMTA" and "integrated aquaculture" differ primarily in their precision and are sometimes interchanged. Aquaponics, fractionated aquaculture, integrated agriculture-aquaculture systems, integrated peri-urban-aquaculture systems, and integrated fisheries-aquaculture systems are all variations of the IMTA concept.

== Range of approaches ==
Today, low-intensity traditional/incidental multi-trophic aquaculture is much more common than modern IMTA. Most are relatively simple, such as fish, seaweed or shellfish.

True IMTA can be land-based, using ponds or tanks, or even open-water marine or freshwater systems. Implementations have included species combinations such as shellfish/shrimp, fish/seaweed/shellfish, fish/seaweed, fish/shrimp and seaweed/shrimp.

IMTA in open water (offshore cultivation) can be done by the use of buoys with lines on which the seaweed grows. The buoys/lines are placed next to the fishnets or cages in which the fish grows. In some tropical Asian countries some traditional forms of aquaculture of finfish in floating cages, nearby fish and shrimp ponds, and oyster farming integrated with some capture fisheries in estuaries can be considered a form of IMTA. Since 2010, IMTA has been used commercially in Norway, Scotland, and Ireland.

In the future, systems with other components for additional functions, or similar functions but different size brackets of particles, are likely. Multiple regulatory issues remain open.

== Modern history of land-based systems ==
Ryther and co-workers created modern, integrated, intensive, land mariculture. They originated, both theoretically and experimentally, the integrated use of extractive organisms—shellfish, microalgae and seaweeds—in the treatment of household effluents, descriptively and with quantitative results. A domestic wastewater effluent, mixed with seawater, was the nutrient source for phytoplankton, which in turn became food for oysters and clams. They cultivated other organisms in a food chain rooted in the farm's organic sludge. Dissolved nutrients in the final effluent were filtered by seaweed (mainly Gracilaria and Ulva) biofilters. The value of the original organisms grown on human waste effluents was minimal.

In 1976, Huguenin proposed adaptations to the treatment of intensive aquaculture effluents in both inland and coastal areas. Tenore followed by integrating with their system of carnivorous fish and the macroalgivore abalone.

In 1977, Hughes-Games described the first practical marine fish/shellfish/phytoplankton culture, followed by Gordin, et al., in 1981. By 1989, a semi-intensive (1 kg fish/m^{−3}) seabream and grey mullet pond system by the Gulf of Aqaba (Eilat) on the Red Sea supported dense diatom populations, excellent for feeding oysters. Hundreds of kilos of fish and oysters cultured here were sold. Researchers also quantified the water quality parameters and nutrient budgets in (5 kg fish m^{−3}) green water seabream ponds. The phytoplankton generally maintained reasonable water quality and converted on average over half the waste nitrogen into algal biomass. Experiments with intensive bivalve cultures yielded high bivalve growth rates. This technology supported a small farm in southern Israel.

== Sustainability ==
IMTA promotes economic and environmental sustainability by converting byproducts and uneaten feed from fed organisms into harvestable crops, thereby reducing eutrophication, and increasing economic diversification.

Properly managed multi-trophic aquaculture accelerates growth without detrimental side-effects. This increases the site's ability to assimilate the cultivated organisms, thereby reducing negative environmental impacts.

IMTA enables farmers to diversify their output by replacing purchased inputs with byproducts from lower trophic levels, often without new sites. Initial economic research suggests that IMTA can increase profits and can reduce financial risks due to weather, disease and market fluctuations. Over a dozen studies have investigated the economics of IMTA systems since 1985.

The economic sustainability of IMTA is enhanced through diversification. By cultivating multiple species, farmers can spread their economic risk and gain multiple sources of revenue. For example, if the market demand for one species drops, farmers can rely on the production of other species, such as shellfish or seaweed. This reduces the economic vulnerability that is typically associated with monoculture systems. Additionally, the diverse production of food and raw materials further contributes to the system's long-term economic viability.

== Nutrient flow ==
Typically, carnivorous fish or shrimp occupy IMTA's higher trophic levels. They excrete soluble ammonia and phosphorus (orthophosphate). Seaweeds and similar species can extract these inorganic nutrients directly from their environment. Fish and shrimp also release organic nutrients which feed shellfish and deposit feeders.

Species such as shellfish that occupy intermediate trophic levels often play a dual role, both filtering organic bottom-level organisms from the water and generating some ammonia. Waste feed may also provide additional nutrients; either by direct consumption or via decomposition into individual nutrients. In some projects, the waste nutrients are also gathered and reused in the food given to the fish in cultivation. This can happen by processing the seaweed grown into food.

IMTA systems can significantly improve nutrient recovery efficiency. This is especially crucial in regions where conventional monoculture farming leads to nutrient imbalances, contributing to eutrophication and dead zones. Shellfish, such as mussels and oysters, filter out excess nitrogen and phosphorus from the water, while seaweed absorbs carbon dioxide and releases oxygen, fostering better water quality and a more stable marine environment.

=== Recovery efficiency ===
Nutrient recovery efficiency is a function of technology, harvest schedule, management, spatial configuration, production, species selection, trophic level biomass ratios, natural food availability, particle size, digestibility, season, light, temperature, and water flow. Since these factors significantly vary by site and region, recovery efficiency also varies.

In a hypothetical family-scale fish/microalga /bivalve/seaweed farm, based on pilot scale data, at least 60% of nutrient input reached commercial products, nearly three times more than in modern net pen farms. Expected average annual yields of the system for a hypothetical 1 hectare (2.5 acres) were 35 tonnes (34 long tons; 39 short tons) of seabream, 100 tonnes (98 long tons; 110 short tons) of bivalves and 125 tonnes (123 long tons; 138 short tons) of seaweeds. These results required precise water quality control and attention to suitability for bivalve nutrition, due to the difficulty in maintaining consistent phytoplankton populations.

Seaweeds' nitrogen uptake efficiency ranges from 2-100% in land-based systems. Uptake efficiency in open-water IMTA is unknown.

== Food safety and quality ==
Feeding the wastes of one species to another has the potential for contamination, although this has yet to be observed in IMTA systems. Mussels and kelp growing adjacent to Atlantic salmon cages in the Bay of Fundy have been monitored since 2001 for contamination by medicines, heavy metals, arsenic, PCBs and pesticides. Concentrations are consistently either non-detectable or well below regulatory limits established by the Canadian Food Inspection Agency, the United States Food and Drug Administration and European Community Directives. Taste testers indicate that these mussels are free of "fishy" taste and aroma and could not distinguish them from "wild" mussels. The mussels' meat yield is significantly higher, reflecting the increase in nutrient availability. Recent findings suggest mussels grown adjacent to salmon farms are advantageous for winter harvest because they maintain high meat weight and condition index (meat to shell ratio). This finding is of particular interest because the Bay of Fundy, where this research was conducted, produces low condition index mussels during winter months in monoculture situations, and seasonal presence of paralytic shellfish poisoning (PSP) typically restricts mussel harvest to the winter months.

== Locations ==
Historic and ongoing research projects include:

=== Asia ===
Japan, China, South Korea, Thailand, Vietnam, Indonesia, Bangladesh, etc. have co-cultured aquatic species for centuries in marine, brackish and fresh water environments. Fish, shellfish and seaweeds have been cultured together in bays, lagoons and ponds. Trial and error has improved integration over time. The proportion of Asian aquaculture production that occurs in IMTA systems is unknown.

After the 2004 tsunami, many of the shrimp farmers in Aceh Province of Indonesia and Ranong Province of Thailand were trained in IMTA. This has been especially important as the mono-culture of marine shrimp was widely recognized as unsustainable. Production of tilapia, mud crabs, seaweeds, milkfish, and mussels have been incorporated. AquaFish Collaborative Research Support Program

==== Bangladesh ====
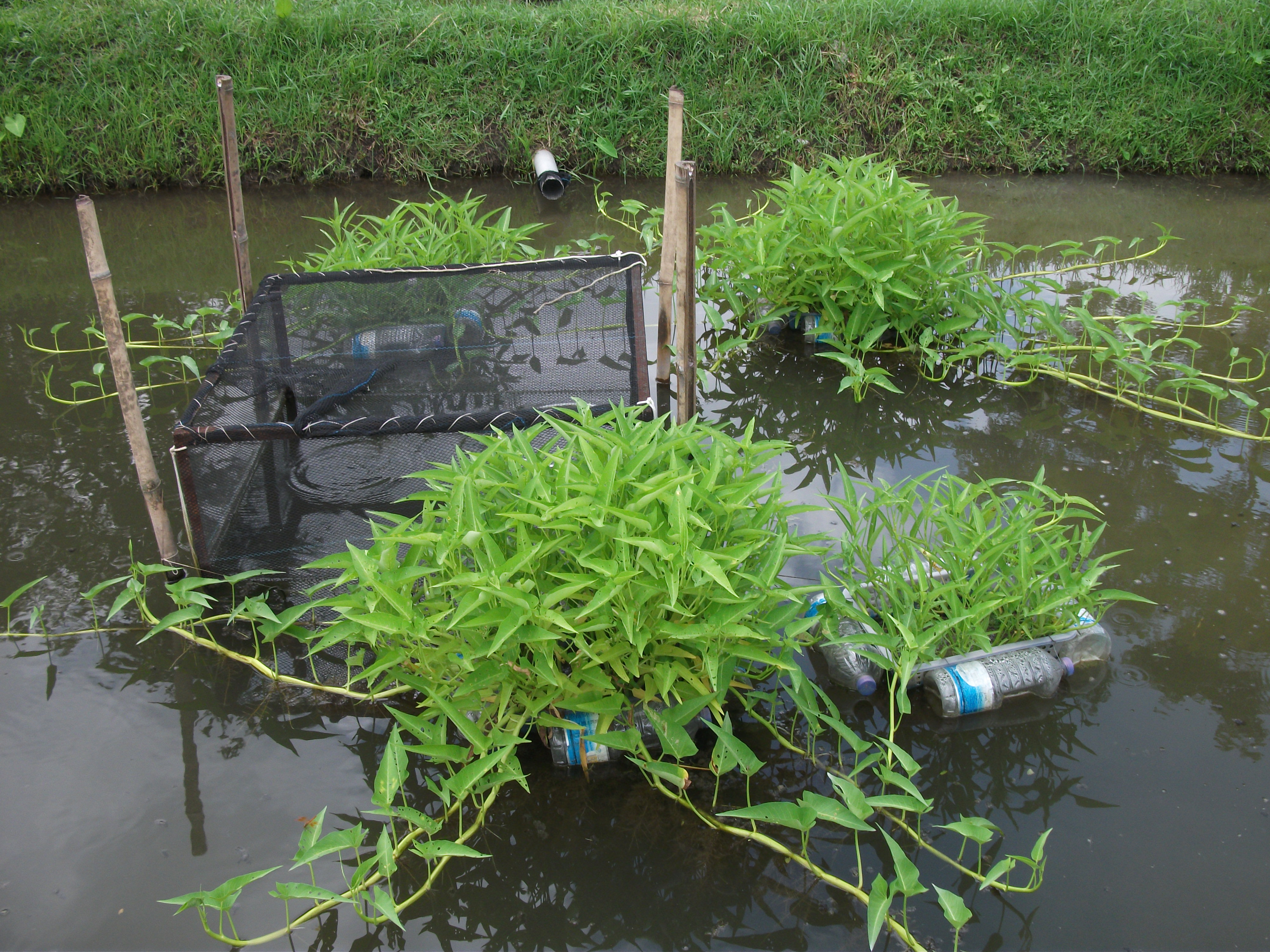
IMTA systems in freshwater pond

Indian carps and stinging catfish are cultured in Bangladesh, but the methods could be more productive. The pond and cage cultures used are based only on the fish. They don't take advantage of the productivity increases that could take place if other trophic levels were included. Expensive artificial feeds are used, partly to supply the fish with protein. These costs could be reduced if freshwater snails, such as Viviparus bengalensis, were simultaneously cultured, thus increasing the available protein. The organic and inorganic wastes produced as a byproduct of culturing could also be minimized by integrating freshwater snail and aquatic plants, such as water spinach, respectively.

=== Europe ===
==== Gran Canaria ====
An IMTA demonstration from the Pharos project in Gran Canaria investigates pollution reduction and biodiversity restoration resulting from the nutrient-rich waste released by commercial aquaculture cage operations. It involves surrounding a commercial aquaculture cage with polyculture macroalgae, high-value abalone lines, sea cucumber cages, and artificial reef combinations. The Pharos project is an EU-funded project under Horizon Europe, led by Dr. Gordon Dalton.

==== Netherlands ====
In the Netherlands, Willem Brandenburg of UR Wageningen (Plant Sciences Group) has established the first seaweed farm in the Netherlands. The farm is called "De Wierderij" and is used for research.

==== United Kingdom ====
The Scottish Association for Marine Science, in Oban is developing co-cultures of salmon, oysters, sea urchins, and brown and red seaweeds via several projects. Research focuses on biological and physical processes, as well as production economics and implications for coastal zone management. Researchers include: M. Kelly, A. Rodger, L. Cook, S. Dworjanyn, and C. Sanderson.

==== Ireland ====
Located in Bantry on Ireland’s west coast, a Pharos project demonstration investigates the co-location of polyculture seaweed alongside a large salmon farm to assess environmental benefits. Conducted by Bantry Marine Research Station in collaboration with the Ultfarms project, the study compares two sites: a 6-hectar Bantry farm cultivating Alaria esculenta, Saccharina latissima, and Laminaria digitata adjacent to a salmon farm, and a control site in Roaringwater Bay. The demonstration examines differences in biodiversity, CO₂ sequestration, and potential buffering of ocean acidification, with the Bantry site consisting of 17 lines of 110 metres each designed for high biomass production.

=== Canada ===
==== Bay of Fundy ====
Industry, academia and government are collaborating here to expand production to commercial scale. The current system integrates Atlantic salmon, blue mussels and kelp; deposit feeders are under consideration. AquaNet (one of Canada's Networks of Centres of Excellence) funded phase one. The Atlantic Canada Opportunities Agency is funding phase two. The project leaders are Thierry Chopin (University of New Brunswick in Saint John) and Shawn Robinson (Department of Fisheries and Oceans, St. Andrews Biological Station).

==== Pacific SEA-lab ====
Pacific SEA-lab was researching and was licensed for the co-culture of sablefish, scallops, oysters, blue mussels, urchins and kelp. "SEA" stands for Sustainable Ecological Aquaculture. The project aimed to balance four species. The project was headed by Stephen Cross under a British Columbia Innovation Award at the University of Victoria Coastal Aquaculture Research & Training (CART) network.

=== South America ===
==== Chile ====
The i-mar Research Center at the Universidad de Los Lagos, in Puerto Montt is working to reduce the environmental impact of intensive salmon culture. Initial research involved trout, oysters and seaweeds. Present research is focusing on open waters with salmon, seaweeds and abalone. The project leader is Alejandro Buschmann.

=== Middle East ===
==== Israel ====
===== SeaOr Marine Enterprises Ltd. =====
SeaOr Marine Enterprises Ltd., which operated for several years on the Israeli Mediterranean coast, north of Tel Aviv, cultured marine fish (gilthead seabream), seaweeds (Ulva and Gracilaria) and Japanese abalone. Its approach leveraged local climate and recycled fish waste products into seaweed biomass, which was fed to the abalone. It also effectively purified the water sufficiently to allow the water to be recycled to the fishponds and to meet point-source effluent environmental regulations.

===== PGP Ltd. =====
PGP Ltd. is a small farm in Southern Israel. It cultures marine fish, microalgae, bivalves and Artemia. Effluents from seabream and seabass collect in sedimentation ponds, where dense populations of microalgae—mostly diatoms—develop. Clams, oysters and sometimes Artemia filter the microalgae from the water, producing a clear effluent. The farm sells the fish, bivalves and Artemia.

=== South Africa ===
Three farms grow seaweeds for feed in abalone effluents in land-based tanks. Up to 50% of re-circulated water passes through the seaweed tanks. Somewhat uniquely, neither fish nor shrimp comprise the upper trophic species. The motivation is to avoid over-harvesting natural seaweed beds and red tides, rather than nutrient abatement. These commercial successes developed from research collaboration between Irvine and Johnson Cape Abalone and scientists from the University of Cape Town and the Stockholm University.

== Gallery ==
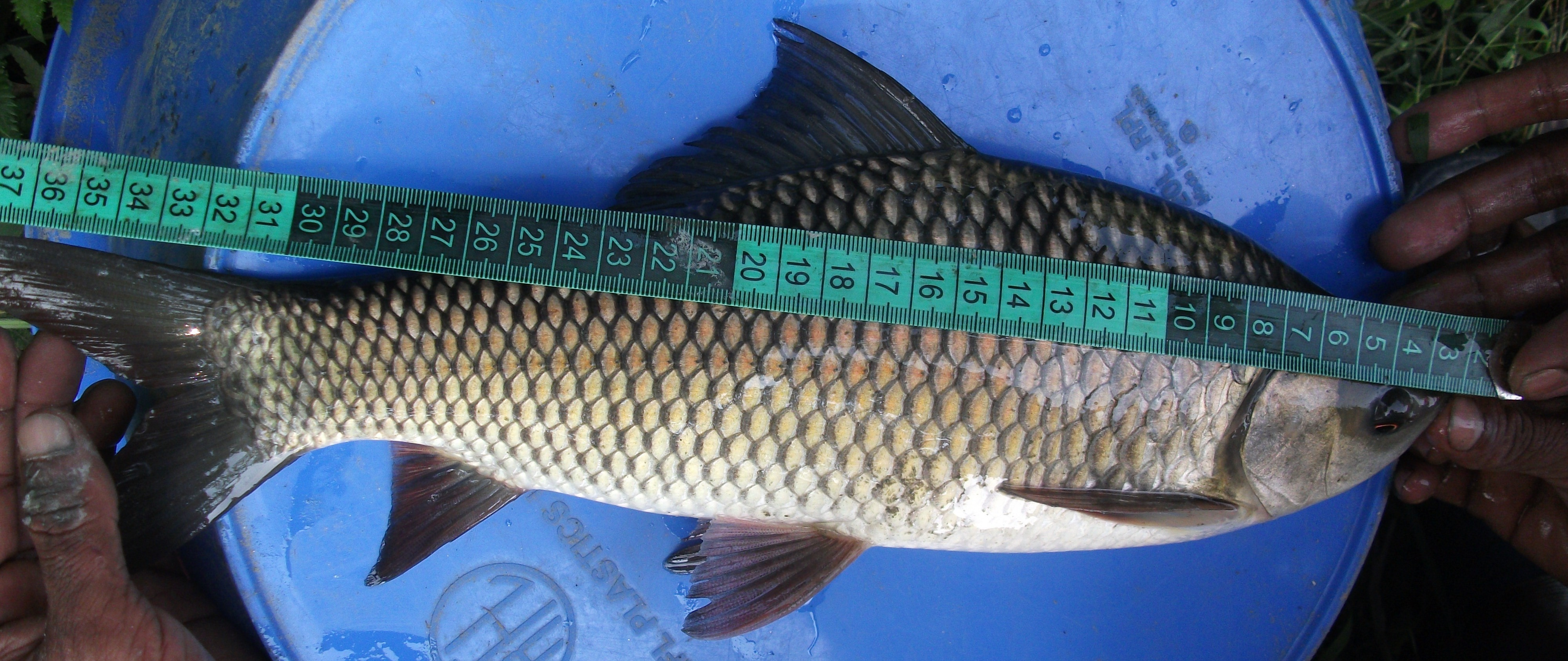
Carp (Labeo rohita) produced in IMTA pond

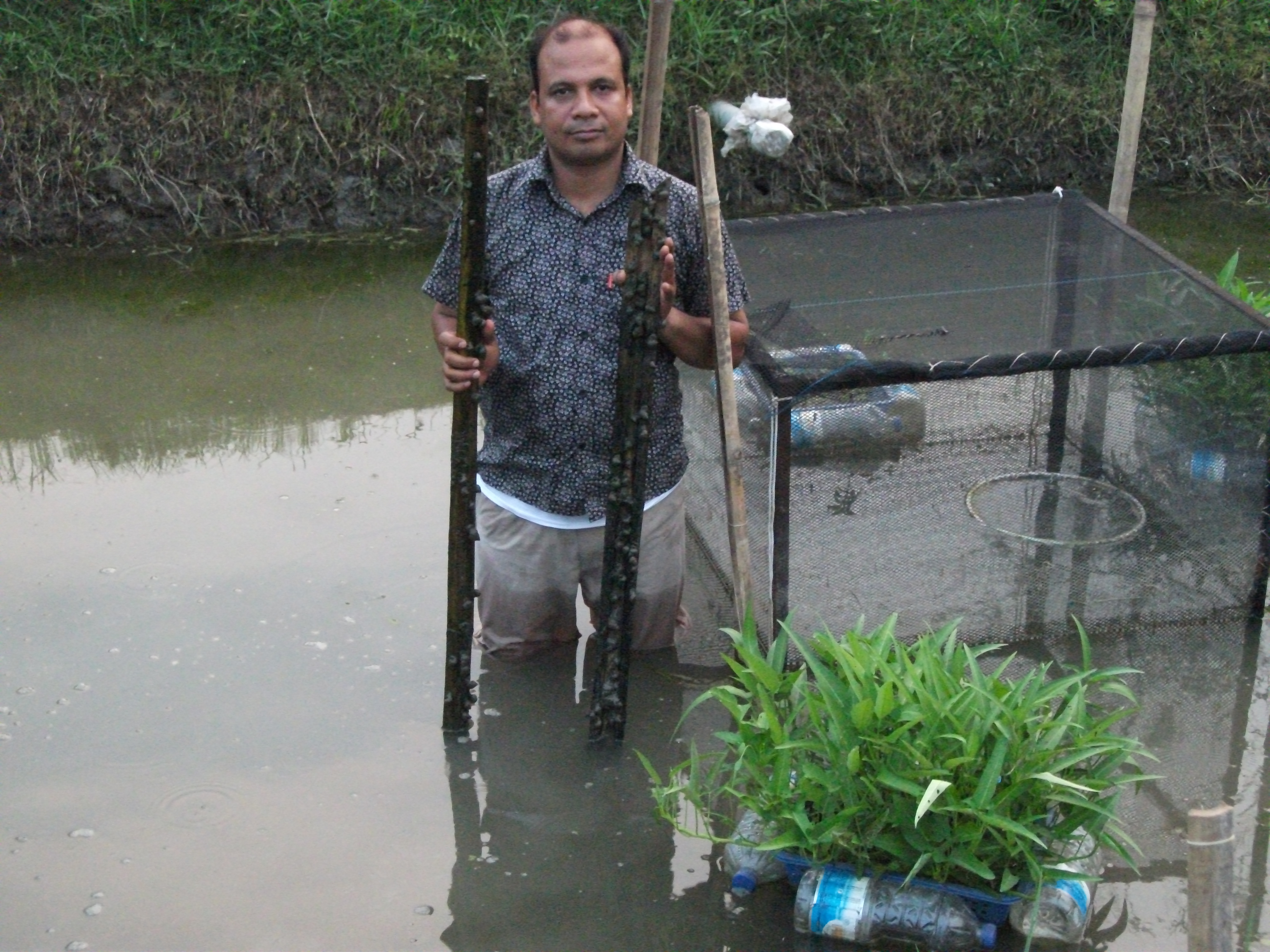
Off-bottom snail grown on bamboo split in IMTA

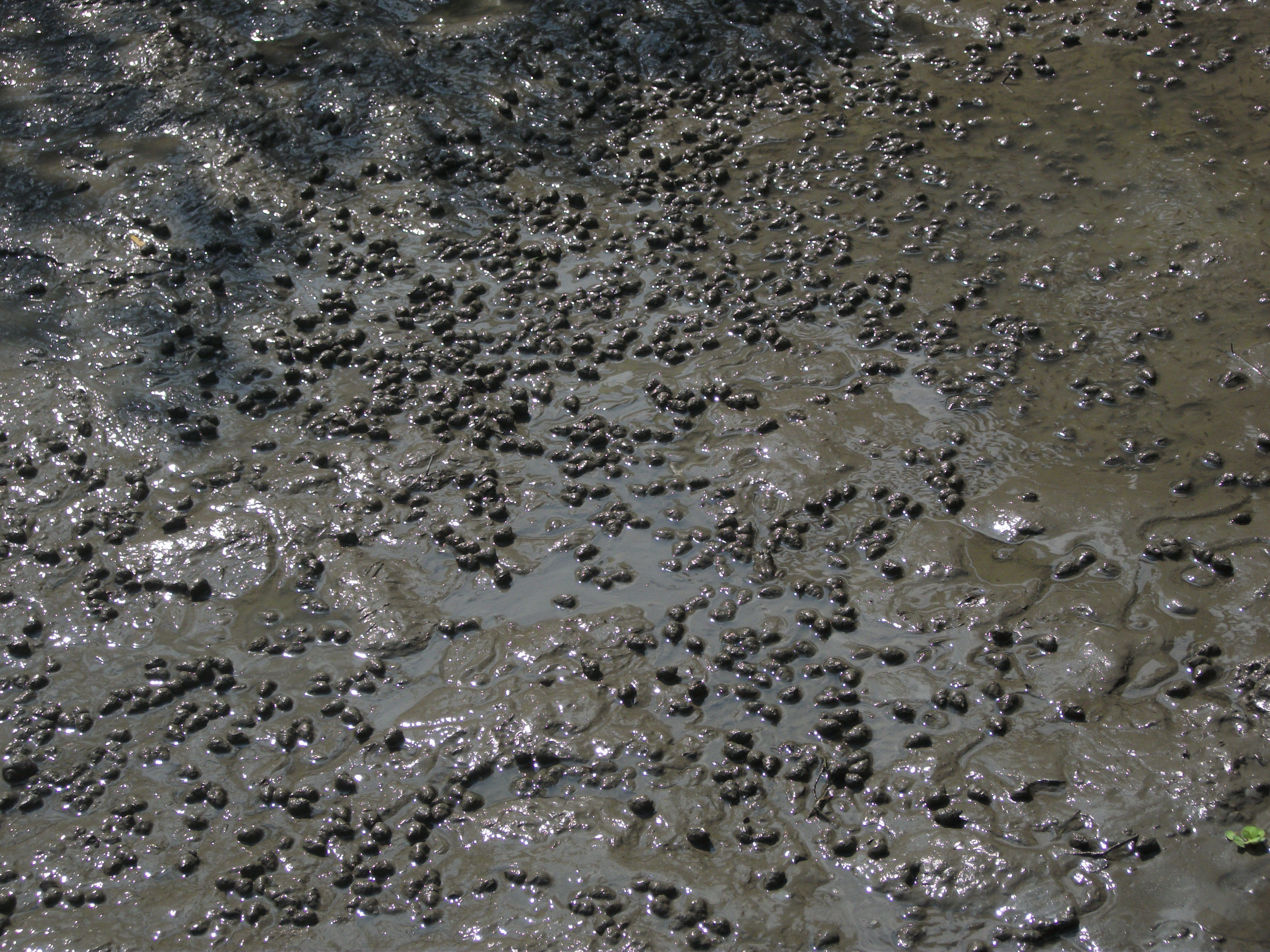
Snail produced on pond bottom of IMTA

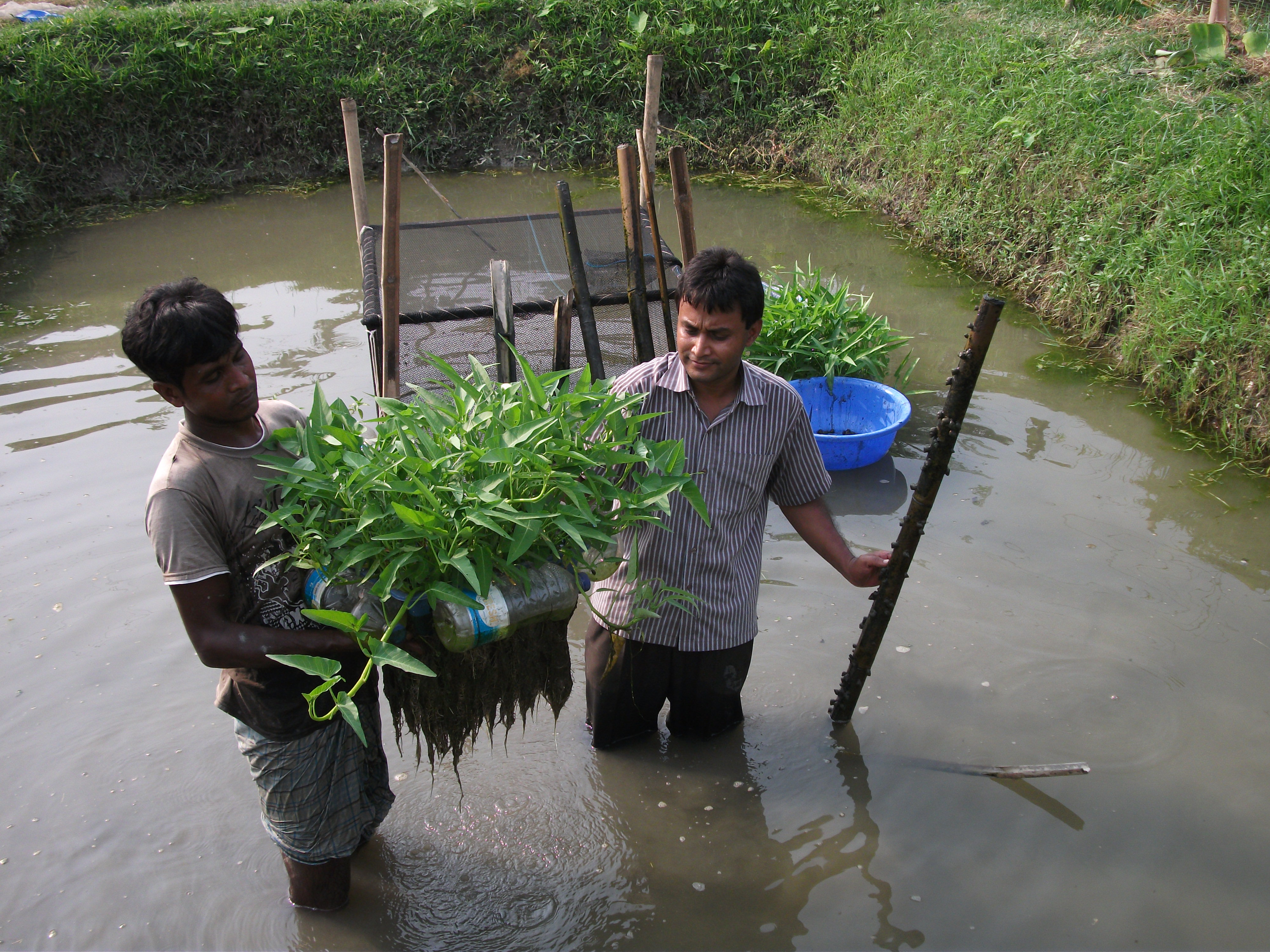
Collection of water spinach and snail from IMTA pond

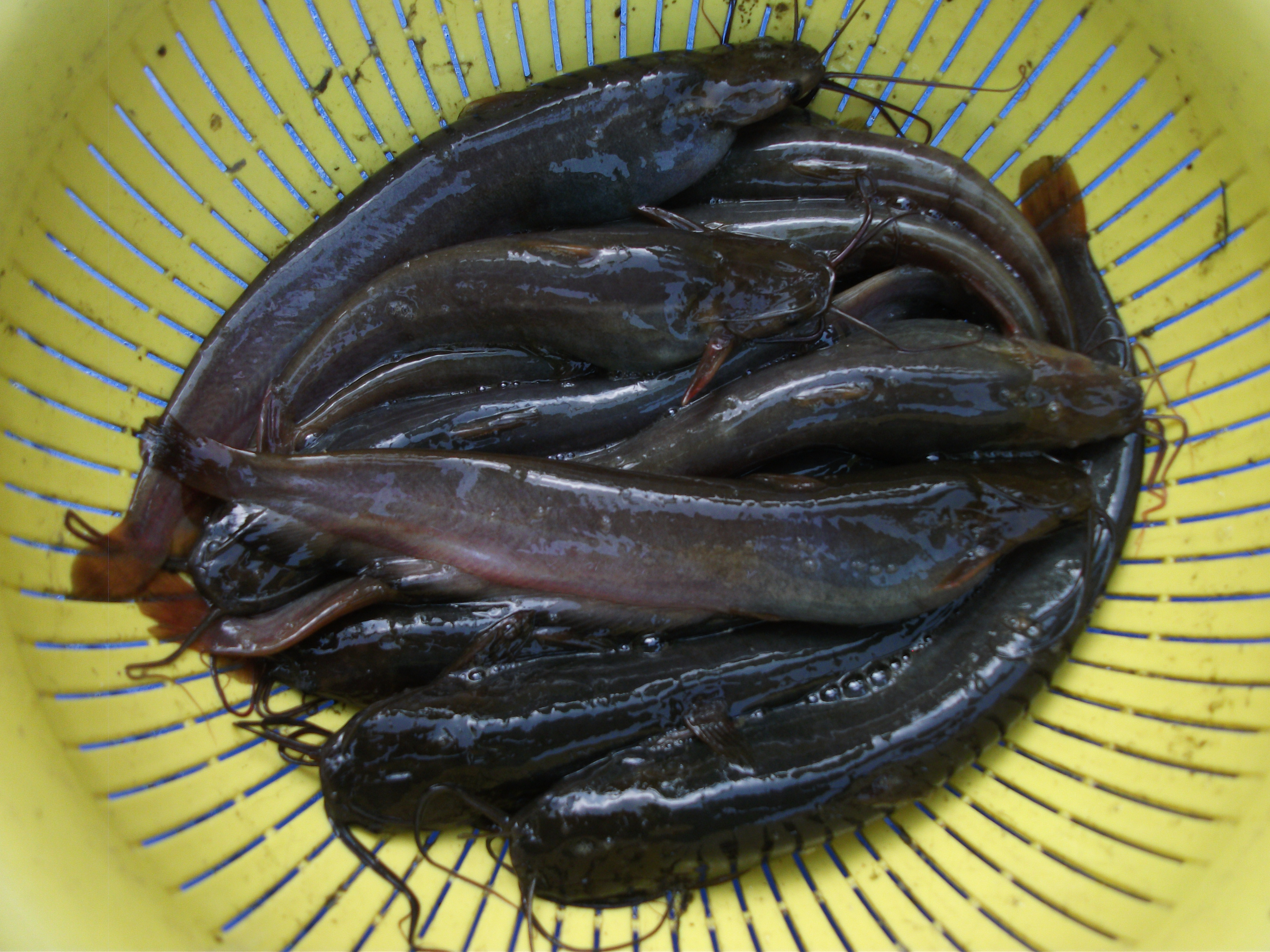
Produced shing in cage in IMTA

== See also ==
- Agribusiness
- Extensive farming
- Factory farming
- Genetically modified organism
- History of agriculture
- Industrial agriculture
- Industrial agriculture (animals)
- Industrial agriculture (crops)
- Intensive farming
- Organic farming
- Sustainable agriculture
- Zero waste agriculture
