= Photosynthate partitioning =

Photosynthate partitioning is the deferential distribution of photosynthates to plant tissues. A photosynthate is the resulting product of photosynthesis, these products are generally sugars. These sugars that are created from photosynthesis are broken down to create energy for use by the plant. Sugar and other compounds move via the phloem to tissues that have an energy demand. These areas of demand are called sinks. While areas with an excess of sugars and a low energy demand are called sources. Many times sinks are the actively growing tissues of the plant while the sources are where sugars are produced by photosynthesis—the leaves of plants. Sugars are actively loaded into the phloem and moved by a positive pressure flow created by solute concentrations and turgor pressure between xylem and phloem vessel elements (specialized plant cells). This movement of sugars is referred to as translocation. When sugars arrive at the sink they are unloaded for storage or broken down/metabolized.

The partitioning of these sugars depends on multiple factors such as the vascular connections that exist, the location of the sink to source, the developmental stage, and the strength of that sink. Vascular connections exist between sources and sinks and those that are the most direct have been shown to receive more photosynthates than those that must travel through extensive connections. This also goes for proximity: those closer to the source are easier to translocate sugars to. Developmental stage plays a large role in partitioning, organs that are young such as meristems and new leaves have a higher demand, as well as those that are entering reproductive maturity—creating fruits, flowers, and seeds. Many of these developing organs have a higher sink strength. Those with higher sink strengths receive more photosynthates than lower strength sinks. Sinks compete to receive these compounds and combination of factors playing in determining how much and how fast sinks receives photosynthates to grow and complete physiological activities.
