= Sustainable Agriculture Research and Education =

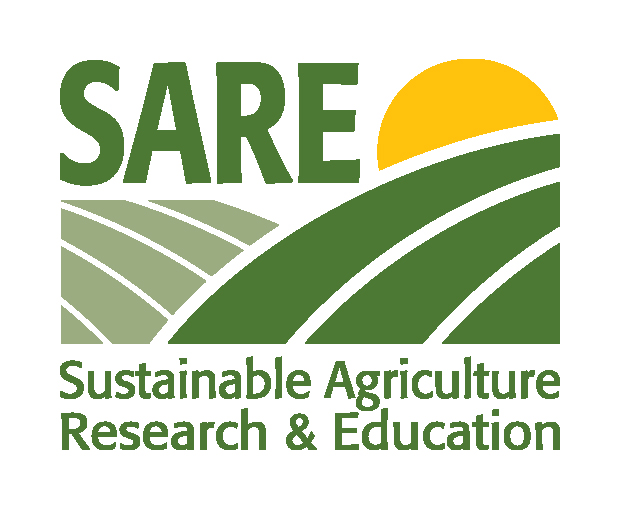
USDA Sustainable Agriculture Research & Education Logo

The USDA Agency logo.

Sustainable Agriculture Research and Education or (SARE) is a competitive grant program established by the USDA agency, the Cooperative State Research, Education, and Extension Service. The program is subdivided into regional areas (North Central, Northeast, South, and West), each with their own leadership. The purpose of SARE is to promote research and education on sustainable agriculture practices and ensure the economic viability of the agricultural industry in the United States for future generations.

== Mission ==
"SARE's mission is to advance, to the whole of American agriculture, innovations that improve profitability, stewardship and quality of life by investing in groundbreaking research and education."

== History ==
=== Beginnings ===
Congress created the Agricultural Productivity Act in response to the need for government establishment of a sustainable agriculture program in 1985. In 1988, the first congressional appropriation was made to the program in the form of $3.9 million. In 1991, the United States Environmental Protection Agency (EPA) dedicated $1 million to a joint EPA and USDA subproject of SARE entitled Agriculture in Concert with the Environment.

=== 1990s ===
In the early 1990s, SARE created a national outreach office to spread public awareness to their cause. They created publications to disperse that contained information on how to begin the conversion from traditional to sustainable agriculture methods. Additionally, SARE began funding farmer-led research while Congress contributed funding to a SARE Professional Development Program, which provides members of the agriculture industry with training, grants, and resources to build awareness, knowledge, and skills related to sustainable agriculture practices.

In the late 1990s, national attention began to be brought to sustainable and organic agriculture methods. The program began to shift its focus towards marketing, local production, and the use of efficient, renewable energy sources on farms. The Secretary of Agriculture was influenced by the program to issue a memorandum pledging to make sustainability a key focus of all USDA policies and programs. The USDA National Agroforestry Center co-funded a program that lasted for 6 years, which assisted farmers in the development of agroforestry plans. Meanwhile, SARE furthered their funding of research on revolutionary agricultural methods and technology by awarding grants to graduate students' research projects nationwide.

=== 2000s ===
On November 18, 2000, the program supported the Smithsonian National Museum of Natural History in their opening of an exhibit entitled "Listening to the Prairie: Farming in Nature's Image". The exhibit featured the techniques used by farmers to maximize their output while preserving the surrounding prairies. It ran until March 31, 2001.

In 2008, SARE celebrated its 20th anniversary. To that date, the program had funded 3,700 projects and was operating with an annual budget of approximately $19 million.

== The Four Regions ==
=== North Central ===
The North Central region of SARE includes: Illinois, Iowa, Kansas, Michigan, Minnesota, Missouri, Nebraska, North Dakota, Ohio, South Dakota, and Wisconsin.

Type of Grant	Purpose	Details
Farmer Rancher	Provides funding to farmers/ranchers who wish to study sustainable solutions to current problems in the agriculture industry through on-farm research, demonstration, and education projects	•Grants are offered to: individuals (maximum award of $7,500), a team of two (maximum award of $15,000), or a group (maximum award of $22,500) •Maximum 2-year duration •Approximately 40 projects are funded per year
Research and Education	Funds projects created by researchers and educators to study and promote environmentally friendly, profitable, and socially responsible food/fiber production. Projects include a strong outreach component.	•Awards range from $10,000 to $200,000 •Maximum duration of 3 years •Approximately 7-10 projects funded per year
Professional Development Program	Provides funding for farmers to train agricultural educators in extension, Natural Resources Conservation Service, private, and not-for-profit sectors to address issues relevant to the farm community	•Awards range from $30,000 to $75,000 •Maximum duration of 3 years •Approximately 5-10 projects are funded each year
Graduate Student	Funds graduate students’ research that addresses sustainable agriculture issues	•Maximum award of $10,000 •Maximum duration of 3 years •At least 15 projects funded per year
Youth Educator	Funding is intended to create opportunities for youth educators to explore, demonstrate, and further their education regarding sustainable agriculture in order to better educate adolescences	•Maximum award of $2,000
Partnership	Funding is intended to promote cooperation between agriculture professionals and small groups of farmers and ranchers to further on-farm research, demonstration, and education activities related to sustainable agriculture	•Maximum award of $30,000 •Maximum duration of 2 years •Generally, 3 or more farmers/ranchers must be significantly involved in the project •Each farm/ranch must be an independent operation

=== Northeast ===
The Northeast region of SARE includes: Connecticut, Delaware, Maine, Maryland, Massachusetts, New Hampshire, New Jersey, New York, Pennsylvania, Rhode Island, Vermont, West Virginia, and Washington, D.C.

Type of Grant	Purpose	Details
Research and Education	Funds proposals for research, education, and on-farm demonstration projects that seek to improve farming practices and enhance quality of life for farmers and rural communities. The projects must include farmers and relevant stakeholders in the planning, implementation, and evaluation of the project.	•Awards range from $30,000-$200,000 with an average of $146,000 per grant •Projects typically span 2–3 years with a maximum duration of 4 years •Intended for researchers and educators who propose outcome-based projects that benefit farmers and study new methods of sustainable farming.
Partnership	Funds provide financial support to agricultural service providers who work with farmers to complete on-farm demonstrations, research, marketing, and other projects that further the understanding of sustainable agriculture.	•Maximum award of $15,000 •Funding lasts for 1–2 years based on the scope of the project •Projects must take place on farms or must directly involve farm businesses
Farmer	Intends to develop, refine, and demonstrate new sustainable farming techniques and study innovative ideas developed and utilized by farmers in the region.	•Maximum award of $15,000 •Funding lasts for 1–2 years based on the scope of the project
Professional Development	Funds outcome-based projects that train Cooperative Extension educators and other professionals in the agriculture industry on sustainability. This grant is intended for organizations that develop and deliver training, not individuals who hope to receive training.	•Awards range from $30,000 to $150,000 with an average award of $75,000 •Funding may last 1–3 years, with a maximum duration of 4 years
Graduate Student	Provides funding to graduate students researching topics related to sustainable agriculture to benefit the interests of farmers and the agricultural community as a whole	•Maximum award of $15,000 •Provides funding for up to 2 years
Agroecosystems Research	Funds long-term research projects that study sustainable agriculture through ecological interactions	•This grant has only funded 2 projects to this date, both of which are currently ongoing

=== South ===
The Southern region of SARE includes: Alabama, Arkansas, Florida, Georgia, Kentucky, Louisiana, Mississippi, North Carolina, Oklahoma, Puerto Rico, South Carolina, Tennessee, Texas, U.S. Virgin Islands, and Virginia.

Type of Grant	Purpose	Details
Research and Education	Funds teams of interdisciplinary researchers that develop a systems approach in sustainable agriculture	•Awards range from $100,000 to $300,000 •Maximum duration of 3 years
Large Systems Research	Funds teams of interdisciplinary researchers who have already established successful agriculture systems but require support to accomplish additional long-term research goals	•Maximum award of $100,000 per year •Maximum duration of 3 years with an opportunity for an additional 3-year renewal
Professional Development	Provides funding to train educators who provide training to professionals in the agriculture industry	•There is no maximum award value, however, priority is given to projects requesting less than $80,000 •Typically funds 3-4 training projects
On-Farm Research	Provides funding to agriculture professionals who are currently working with farmers and ranchers on developing sustainable agriculture practices	•Maximum award of $15,000 •Maximum duration of 3 years •Approximately 6 projects are funded per year
Producer	Provides funding to individual farmers/ranchers or groups of farmers/ranchers interested in developing sustainable production and marketing practices.	•Funding is not intended for beginning farmers and cannot be used to pay a farmer to farm, start a farm, expand a farm, buy land, or make capital investments or farm improvements
Sustainable Community Innovation	Funding is intended to develop a connection between sustainable agriculture and healthy economic community development	•Maximum award of $35,000 •Maximum duration of 1 year
Graduate Student	Provides funding for full-time graduate students who are interested in conducting sustainable agriculture research and are currently attending an accredited university in the Southern region of the United States	•Maximum award of $11,000 •Maximum duration of 3 years
Young Scholars Enhancement Program	Provides funding for high school students and freshmen/sophomore college students to conduct research and further their education regarding sustainable agriculture	

=== West ===
The Western region of SARE includes: Alaska, American Samoa, Arizona, California, Colorado, Federated States of Micronesia, Guam, Hawaii, Idaho, Montana, Nevada, New Mexico, Oregon, Utah, Washington, and Wyoming.

Type of Grant	Purpose	Details
Research and Education	Provides funding to scientists, producers and others who create projects which use an interdisciplinary approach to address issues related to sustainable agriculture	Example
Professional Development Program	Funding supports training of agricultural professionals to assist them in disseminating knowledge about sustainable agriculture models and practices	•Maximum award of $75,000 •Maximum duration of 3 years during which the final year should focus on project evaluation
Farmer/Rancher	Funding allows agricultural producers to conduct on-site experiments that focus on improving daily operations and maintaining a healthy environment, with results being shared with the agricultural community.	•Maximum award of $20,000 to an individual and $25,000 to a group of 3 or more individuals •Duration of 1–3 years
Professional + Producer	Provides funding for projects which study sustainable agriculture through on-site experiments and are led by an agricultural professional (either a Cooperative Extension educator or a Natural Resources Conservation Service professional)	•Maximum award of $50,000 •Duration of 1–3 years •Must have at least 5 producers involved in the project
Graduate Student Grants in Sustainable Agriculture	Funding allows full-time masters/Ph.D. students at accredited colleges/universities in the Western region of the United States to conduct research relating to current issues regarding sustainable agriculture in the Western region	•Maximum award of $25,000 •Duration of 1–2 years

== Evaluation of the program's effectiveness ==
As of 2008, 64% of farmers who had received SARE grants stated that they had been able to earn increased profits as a result of the funding they received and utilization of sustainable agriculture methods. Additionally, 79% of grantees said that they had experienced a significant improvement in soil quality through the environmental friendly, sustainable methods that they were utilizing on their farms.
