= Zero waste agriculture =

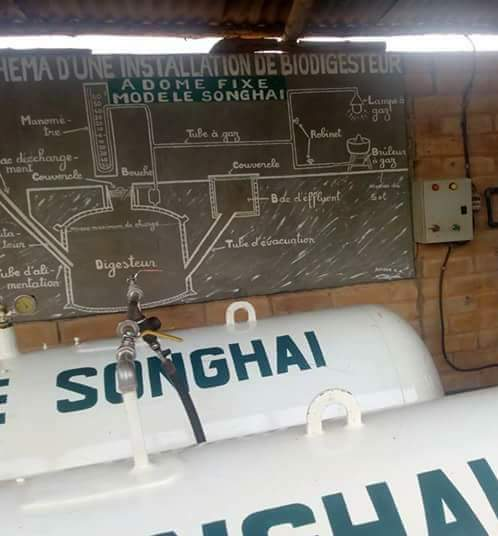
The Songhai zero waste farm in Benin was started by Father Godfrey Nzamujo in 1985. It is now recognised as a centre of excellence by the UN and its philosophy and methods are now studied and followed by thousands in Africa. The picture shows the generation of biofuel from animal waste. This fuel is then used for cooking and generation of electricity.

Zero waste agriculture is a type of sustainable agriculture which optimizes use of the five natural kingdoms, i.e. plants, animals, bacteria, fungi and algae, to produce biodiverse-food, energy and nutrients in a synergistic integrated cycle of profit making processes where the waste of each process becomes the feedstock for another process.

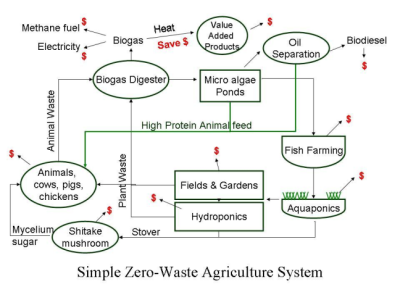

== History ==
The integration of shallow oxidisation ponds of microalgae was demonstrated by Golueke & Oswald in the 1960s. The widespread global implementation of these systems can be largely credited to Prof George Lai Chan-Yu-Thim (2 March 1924 Mauritius-8 October 2016 Mauritius) from ZERI. Zero waste agriculture is now practiced in China (ecological farming), Columbia (integrated food & waste management systems) & Fiji (integrated farming systems), India (integrated biogas farming), South Africa (BEAT Coop & African Agroecological Biotechnology Initiative) and Mauritius. The Brazilian government has adopted integrated farming system as a major social technology for the uplifting of marginalized and subsistence farmers through coordination with TECPAR.

Zero waste agriculture combines mature ecological farming practices that delivers an integrated balance of job creation, poverty relief, food security, energy security, water conservation, climate change relief, land security & stewardship.

== Practice ==
Zero waste agriculture is optimally practiced on small 1-5 ha sized family owned and managed farms and it complements traditional farming & animal husbandry as practiced in most third world communities. Zero Waste Agriculture also preserves local indigenous systems and existing agrarian cultural values and practices.

Zero waste agriculture presents a balance of economically, socially and ecologically benefits as it:

1. optimizes food production in an ecological sound manner
2. reduces water consumption through recycling and reduced evaporation
3. provides energy security through the harvesting of biomethane (biogas) and the extraction of biodiesel from micro-algae, as a by-product of food production
4. provides climate change relief through the substantial reduction in greenhouse gas emissions from both traditional agriculture practices and fossil fuel usage
5. reduces the use of pesticides through biodiverse farming

Certification of such farming practices is both challenging and an opportunity.

== See also ==
- Agricultural technology a/k/a Agritech
- Integrated Multi-Trophic Aquaculture
- Miniwaste
