= Agriculture in Concert with the Environment =

Agriculture in Concert with the Environment (ACE) is a program of the United States Environmental Protection Agency (EPA), administered cooperatively with United States Department of Agriculture's Sustainable Agriculture Research and Education (SARE) program, to fund research projects that reduce the risk of pollution from pesticides and soluble fertilizers.

== Origins ==
In 1991, the EPA partnered with the USDA through the Low-Input Sustainable Agriculture Program (LISA), now referred to as the SARE, and allotted a budget of $1,000,000 to the program. The LISA program pledged to match funds received from the EPA dollar for dollar each year.

== Mission ==
The ACE program was created to aid in the prevention and reduction of agricultural pollution. To achieve this, the program created 3 main goals:

- to reduce the use of pesticides and fertilizers in agricultural practices
- to promote the implementation of nutrient management planning and use of reduced-risk pesticides and biological controls
- to protect ecologically sensitive areas
