= Agricultural expansion =

Growth of agricultural land in the 21st century

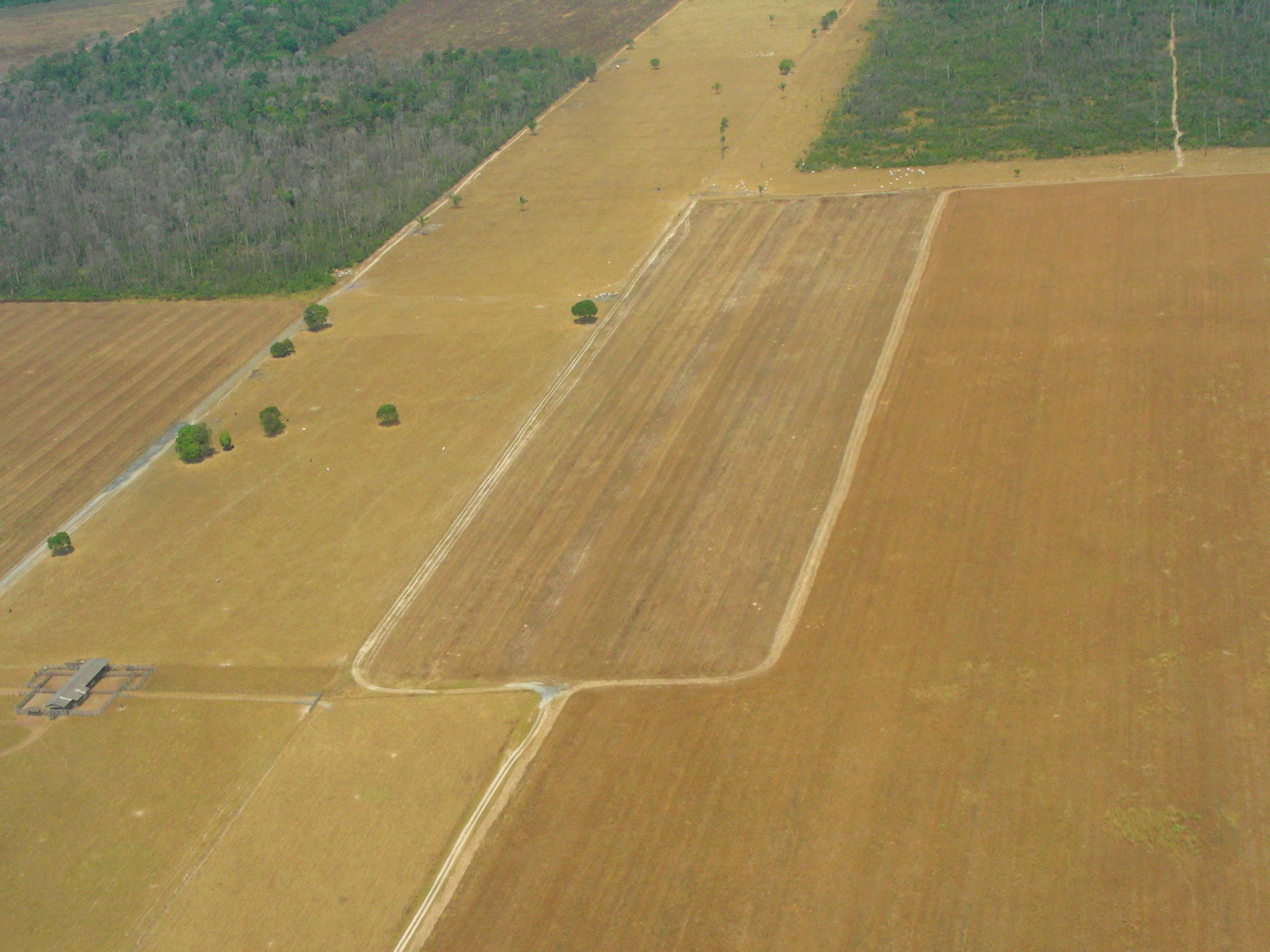
Deforestation for the purpose of farming in Brazil.

Agricultural expansion describes the growth of agricultural land (arable land, pastures, etc.) especially in the 20th and 21st centuries.

The agricultural expansion is often explained as a direct consequence of the global increase in food and energy requirements due to population growth (both which in turn have been attributed to agricultural expansion itself), with an estimated expectation of 10 billion people on Earth by end of this century. It is foreseen that most of the world's non-agrarian ecosystems (terrestrial and aquatic) will be affected adversely, from habitat loss, land degradation, overexploitation, and other problems. The intensified food (and biofuel) production will in particular affect the tropical regions.

Most modern agriculture relies on intensive methods. Further expansion of the predominant farming types that rest on a small number of highly productive crops has led to a significant loss of biodiversity on a global scale already. Moreover, agricultural expansion continues to be the main driver of deforestation and forest fragmentation. Large-scale commercial agriculture (primarily cattle ranching and cultivation of soya bean and oil palm) accounted for 40 percent of tropical deforestation between 2000 and 2010, and local subsistence agriculture for another 33 percent. In the light of the already occurring and potential massive ecological effects, the need for sustainable practices is more urgent than ever.

The FAO predicts that global arable land use will continue to grow from a 1.58 billion hectares (3.9×10^{9} acres) in 2014 to 1.66 billion hectares (4.1×10^{9} acres) in 2050, with most of this growth projected to result from developing countries. At the same time, arable land use in developed countries is likely to continue its decline.

A well-known example of already ongoing agricultural expansion is the proliferation of palm oil production areas or the land conversion/deforestation for soy bean production in South America. Today's land grabbing activities are often a consequence of the strive for agricultural land by growing economies.

In the beginning of the 21st century the palm oil industry caused a massive deforestation in Borneo with heavy consequences.

== See also ==
- Industrial agriculture
- Green revolution
- Environmental impact of agriculture
- Meat consumption
- Overexploitation
- Biodiversity loss
- Carbon sink
- Deforestation
- Land sparing
- Species extinctions
- Jevons paradox
- Social and environmental impact of palm oil
- Land use, land-use change, and forestry

== Sources ==
- Laurance, William F.; Sayer, Jeffrey; Cassman, Kenneth G. (2014). "Agricultural expansion and its impacts on tropical nature". Trends in Ecology & Evolution. 29 (2). Elsevier BV: 107–116. Bibcode:2014TEcoE..29..107L. doi:10.1016/j.tree.2013.12.001. ISSN 0169-5347. PMID 24388286. "The human population is projected to reach 11 billion this century, with the greatest increases in tropical developing nations. This growth, in concert with rising per-capita consumption, will require large increases in food and biofuel production. How will these megatrends affect tropical terrestrial and aquatic ecosystems and biodiversity? We foresee (i) major expansion and intensification of tropical agriculture, especially in Sub-Saharan Africa and South America; (ii) continuing rapid loss and alteration of tropical old-growth forests, woodlands, and semi-arid environments; (iii) a pivotal role for new roadways in determining the spatial extent of agriculture; and (iv) intensified conflicts between food production and nature conservation"
- Tilman, D. (1999-05-25). "Global environmental impacts of agricultural expansion: The need for sustainable and efficient practices". Proceedings of the National Academy of Sciences. 96 (11): 5995–6000. Bibcode:1999PNAS...96.5995T. doi:10.1073/pnas.96.11.5995. ISSN 0027-8424. PMC 34218. PMID 10339530. "The recent intensification of agriculture, and the prospects of future intensification, will have major detrimental impacts on the nonagricultural terrestrial and aquatic ecosystems of the world. The doubling of agricultural food production during the past 35 years was associated with a 6.87-fold increase in nitrogen fertilization, a 3.48-fold increase in phosphorus fertilization, a 1.68-fold increase in the amount of irrigated cropland, and a 1.1-fold increase in land in cultivation. Based on a simple linear extension of past trends, the anticipated next doubling of global food production would be associated with approximately 3-fold increases in nitrogen and phosphorus fertilization rates, a doubling of the irrigated land area, and an 18% increase in cropland."
- "Crop production and natural resource use". World Agriculture: Towards 2015/2030 - FAO.

This article incorporates text from a free content work. Licensed under CC BY-SA 3.0 (license statement/permission). Text taken from The State of the World’s Forests 2020. In brief – Forests, biodiversity and people, FAO & UNEP, FAO & UNEP.
