= Industrial agriculture =

Form of modern industrialized farming

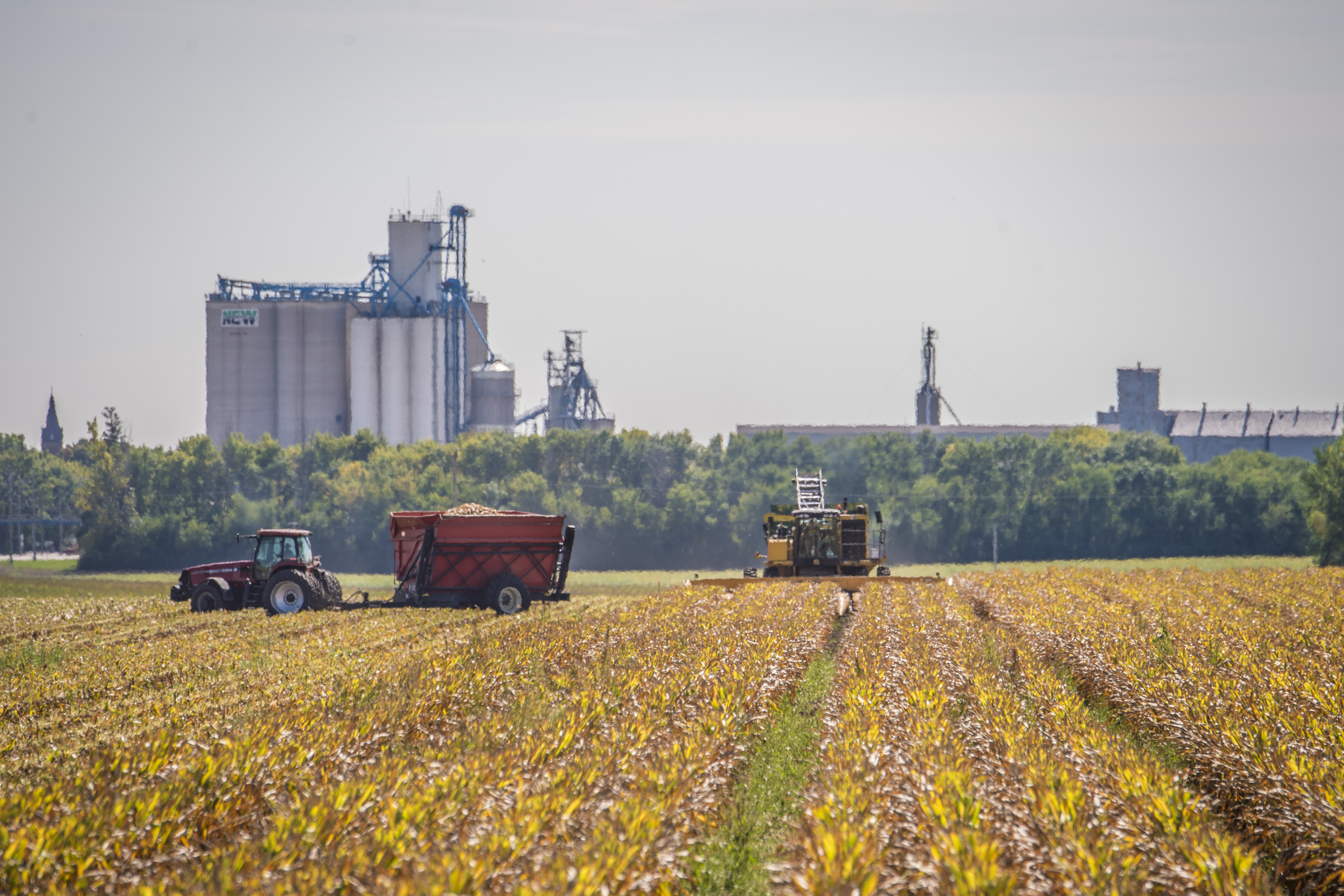
The harvest of seed corn in Iowa

Industrial agriculture is a form of modern farming that refers to the industrialized production of crops and animals and animal products like eggs or milk. The methods of industrial agriculture include innovation in agricultural machinery and farming methods, genetic technology, techniques for achieving economies of scale in production, the creation of new markets for consumption, the application of patent protection to genetic information, and global trade. These methods are widespread in developed nations and increasingly prevalent worldwide. Most of the meat, dairy, eggs, fruits and vegetables available in supermarkets are produced in this way.

== Historical development and future prospects ==
Industrial agriculture arose hand in hand with the Industrial Revolution in general. The identification of nitrogen, potassium and phosphorus (referred to by the acronym NPK) as critical factors in plant growth led to the manufacture of synthetic fertilizers, making possible more intensive types of agriculture. The discovery of vitamins and their role in animal nutrition, in the first two decades of the 20th century, led to vitamin supplements, which in the 1920s allowed certain livestock to be raised indoors, reducing their exposure to adverse natural elements. The discovery of antibiotics and vaccines facilitated raising livestock in concentrated, controlled animal feed operations by reducing diseases caused by crowding. Chemicals developed for use in World War II gave rise to synthetic pesticides. Developments in shipping networks and technology have made long-distance distribution of agricultural produce feasible.

Agricultural production across the world doubled four times between 1820 and 1975 (it doubled between 1820 and 1920; between 1920 and 1950; between 1950 and 1965; and again between 1965 and 1975) to feed a global population of one billion human beings in 1800 and 6.5 billion in 2002. During the same period, the number of people involved in farming dropped as the process became more automated. In the 1930s, 24 percent of the American population worked in agriculture compared to 1.5 percent in 2002; in 1940, each farm worker supplied 11 consumers, whereas in 2002, each worker supplied 90 consumers. The number of farms has also decreased, and their ownership is more concentrated. For example, in the 2000s, the price of farmland in the United States increased due to the Midwest farming crisis. The number of small- and medium-scale farming operations decreased due to the increased production and farmland costs. This forced farmers to find alternatives by taking advantage of new products of industrial agriculture such as financialization.

Financialization takes place through the process of ongoing monetization. An example of monetization involves financial institutions expanding and gain authority in the market. Financialization affects all aspects of farm operations, including the structure of the work, the value of it and the social organizations. Farmers turned to land availability in the Brazilian Cerrado through the help of investors and other capital gaining methods needed for financialization. investors wanted to get involved because the investment appears low-risk with high rewards. For example, investors would gain inside information on the market in Brazil. In the article Financialization of work, value, and social organization among transnational soy farmers in the Brazilian Cerrado Ofstehage gives examples of how industrialized farming has evolved into a management model.

A management model entails the structure and rules that ensure work of management is completed. Work is reliant on outsourcing in order to complete labor farming tasks, but is also an essential part in the way management and financial work is completed. Social value system of farming changed when using a management model. Farmers have to take into consideration the division between good and bad farming tactics under the new management model. Many farmers were reluctant to mobilize because of the effect this would have on their family business. The separation between the management styles of farmers comes down to two approaches; farming as a lifestyle versus farming solely for profit. In the Brazilian Cerrado the farming model is strictly based on increased profit margins which dictates decisions involving management and labor related work.

In the U.S., four companies produce 81 percent of cows, 73 percent of sheep, 57 percent of pigs, and produce 50 percent of chickens, cited as an example of "vertical integration" by the president of the U.S. National Farmers' Union. In 1967, there were one million pig farms in America; as of 2002, there were 114,000 with 80 million pigs (out of 95 million) produced each year on factory farms, according to the U.S. National Pork Producers Council. According to the Worldwatch Institute, 74 percent of the world's poultry, 43 percent of beef and 68 percent of eggs are produced this way.

=== British agricultural revolution ===
The British agricultural revolution describes a period of agricultural development in Britain between the 16th century and the mid-19th century, which saw a massive increase in agricultural productivity and net output. This in turn supported unprecedented population growth, freeing up a significant percentage of the workforce, and thereby helped drive the Industrial Revolution. How this came about is not entirely clear. In recent decades, historians cited four key changes in agricultural practices, enclosure, mechanization, four-field crop rotation and selective breeding, and gave credit to a relatively few individuals.

== Challenges and issues ==
The challenges and issues of industrial agriculture for global and local society, for the industrial agriculture sector, for the individual industrial agriculture farm, and for animal rights include the costs and benefits of both current practices and proposed changes to those practices. This is a continuation of thousands of years of the invention and use of technologies in feeding ever growing populations.

[W]hen hunter-gatherers with growing populations depleted the stocks of game and wild foods across the Near East, they were forced to introduce agriculture. But agriculture brought much longer hours of work and a less rich diet than hunter-gatherers enjoyed. Further population growth among shifting slash-and-burn farmers led to shorter fallow periods, falling yields and soil erosion. Plowing and fertilizers were introduced to deal with these problems—but once again involved longer hours of work and degradation of soil resources(Boserup, The Conditions of Agricultural Growth, Allen and Unwin, 1965, expanded and updated in Population and Technology, Blackwell, 1980.).

While the point of industrial agriculture is lower cost products to create greater productivity thus a higher standard of living as measured by available goods and services, industrial methods have side effects both good and bad. Further, industrial agriculture is not some single indivisible thing, but instead is composed of numerous separate elements, each of which can be modified, and in fact is modified in response to market conditions, government regulation and scientific advances. So the question then becomes for each specific element that goes into an industrial agriculture method or technique or process: What bad side effects are bad enough that the financial gain and good side effects are outweighed? Different interest groups not only reach different conclusions on this, but also recommend differing solutions, which then become factors in changing both market conditions and government regulations.

=== Society ===
The major challenges and issues faced by society concerning industrial agriculture include:

Maximizing the benefits:

- Cheap and abundant food
- Convenience for the consumer
- The contribution to our economy on many levels, from growers to harvesters to processors to sellers

while minimizing the downsides:

- Environmental and social costs
- Antibiotic resistance
- Damage to fisheries
- Cleanup of surface and groundwater polluted with animal waste
- Increased health risks from pesticides
- Increased ozone pollution via methane byproducts of animals
- Global warming from heavy use of fossil fuels

==== Benefits ====
An example of industrial agriculture providing cheap and plentiful food is the U.S.'s "most successful program of agricultural development of any country in the world". Between 1930 and 2000 U.S. agricultural productivity (output divided by all inputs) rose by an average of about 2 percent annually causing food prices paid by consumers to decrease. "The percentage of U.S. disposable income spent on food prepared at home decreased, from 22 percent as late as 1950 to 7 percent by the end of the century."

==== Liabilities ====
===== Economic =====
Economic liabilities for industrial agriculture include the dependence on finite non-renewable fossil fuel energy resources, as an input in farm mechanization (equipment, machinery), for food processing and transportation, and as an input in agricultural chemicals. A future increase in energy prices as projected by the International Energy Agency is therefore expected to result in increase in food prices; and there is therefore a need to 'de-couple' non-renewable energy usage from agricultural production. Other liabilities include peak phosphate as finite phosphate reserves are currently a key input into chemical fertilizer for industrial agriculture.

===== Environment =====
Industrial agriculture uses huge amounts of water, energy, and industrial chemicals; increasing pollution in the arable land, usable water and atmosphere. Herbicides, insecticides, fertilizers and animal waste products are accumulating in ground and surface waters. "Many of the negative effects of industrial agriculture are remote from fields and farms. Nitrogen compounds from the Midwest, for example, travel down the Mississippi to degrade coastal fisheries in the Gulf of Mexico. But other adverse effects are showing up within agricultural production systems—for example, the rapidly developing resistance among pests is rendering our arsenal of herbicides and insecticides increasingly ineffective.". Chemicals used in industrial agriculture, as well as the practice of monoculture, have also been implicated in Colony Collapse Disorder which has led to a collapse in bee populations. Agricultural production is highly dependent on bee pollination to pollinate many varieties of plants, fruits and vegetables.

===== Social =====
A study done for the U.S. Office of Technology Assessment conducted by the UC Davis Macrosocial Accounting Project concluded that industrial agriculture is associated with substantial deterioration of human living conditions in nearby rural communities.

Future increase in food commodity prices, driven by the energy price rises under peak oil and dependency of industrial agriculture on fossil fuels is expected to lead to increase in food prices which has particular impacts on poor people. An example of this can be seen in the 2007–2008 world food price crisis. Food price increases have a disproportionate impact on the poor as they spend a large proportion of their income on food.

===== Vulnerability against shocks =====
Industrial agriculture is very reliant on a steady stream of inputs like fertilizers and pesticides. If this supply of inputs would be disrupted by conflict or large catastrophes, this would decrease yields in industrial agriculture considerably. It has been estimated that this could result in a drop of 35-48 % for agricultural yields globally, and up to 75 % in highly industrialized areas like Central Europe.

== Animals ==
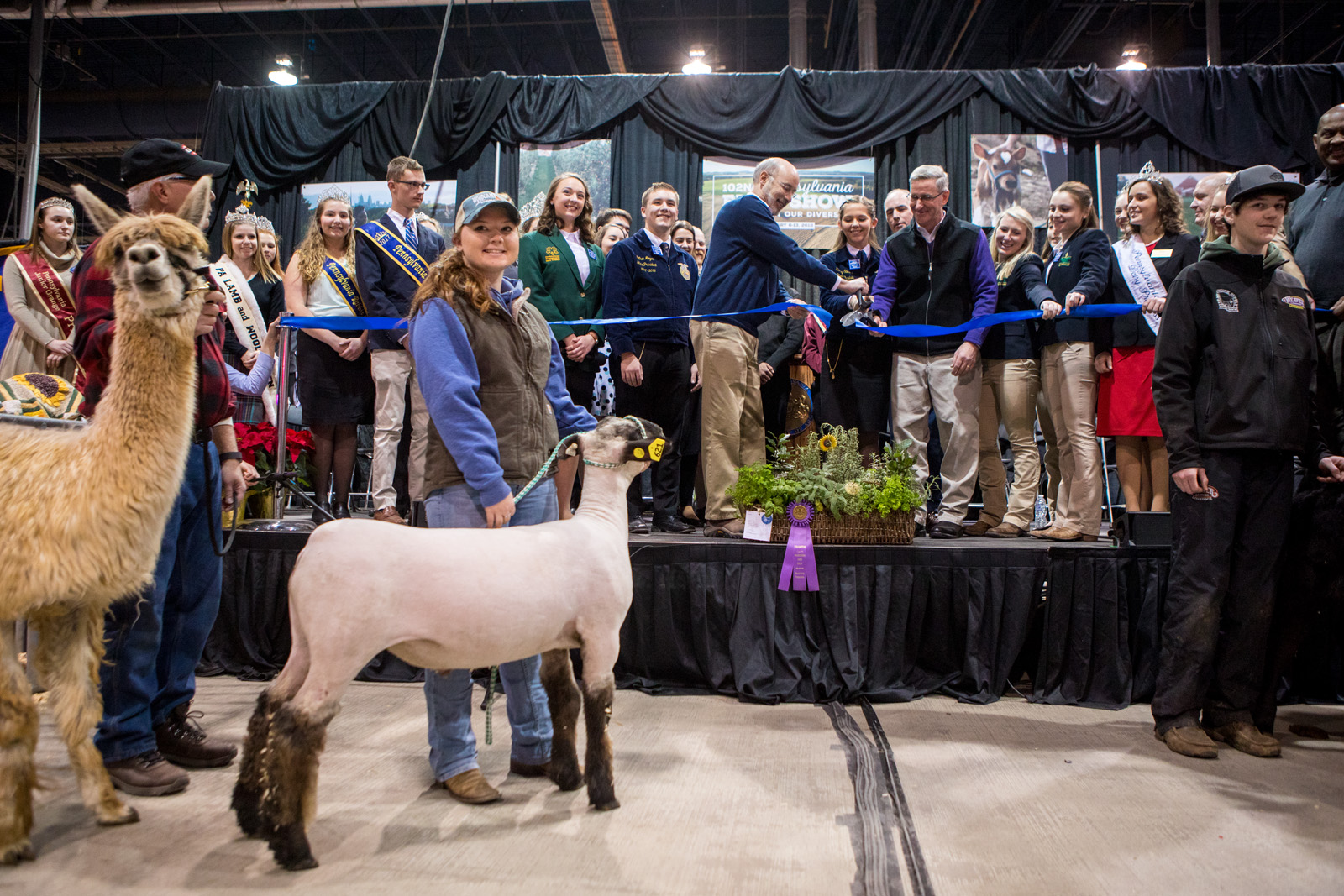
Governor Tom Wolf hosts the 102nd Pennsylvania Farm Show for Industrial Agriculture

"Concentrated animal feeding operations" or "intensive livestock operations", can hold large numbers (some up to hundreds of thousands) of animals, often indoors. These animals are typically cows, hogs, turkeys, or chickens. The distinctive characteristics of such farms is the concentration of livestock in a given space. The aim of the operation is to produce as much meat, eggs, or milk at the lowest possible cost and with the greatest level of food safety.

Food and water are supplied in place, and artificial methods are often employed to maintain animal health and improve production, such as therapeutic use of antimicrobial agents, vitamin supplements and growth hormones. Growth hormones are not used in chicken meat production nor are they used in the European Union for any animal. In meat production, methods are also sometimes employed to control undesirable behaviours often related to stresses of being confined in restricted areas with other animals. More docile breeds are sought (with natural dominant behaviours bred out for example), physical restraints to stop interaction, such as individual cages for chickens, or animals physically modified, such as the de-beaking of chickens to reduce the harm of fighting. Weight gain is encouraged by the provision of plentiful supplies of food to animals breed for weight gain.

The designation "confined animal feeding operation" in the U.S. resulted from that country's 1972 Federal Clean Water Act, which was enacted to protect and restore lakes and rivers to a "fishable, swimmable" quality. The United States Environmental Protection Agency (EPA) identified certain animal feeding operations, along with many other types of industry, as point source polluters of groundwater. These operations were designated as CAFOs and subject to special anti-pollution regulation.

In 17 states in the U.S., isolated cases of groundwater contamination has been linked to CAFOs. For example, the ten million hogs in North Carolina generate 19 million tons of waste per year. The U.S. federal government acknowledges the waste disposal issue and requires that animal waste be stored in lagoons. These lagoons can be as large as 7.5 acres (30,000 m^{2}). Lagoons not protected with an impermeable liner can leak waste into groundwater under some conditions, as can runoff from manure spread back onto fields as fertilizer in the case of an unforeseen heavy rainfall. A lagoon that burst in 1995 released 25 million gallons of nitrous sludge in North Carolina's New River. The spill allegedly killed eight to ten million fish.

The large concentration of animals, animal waste and dead animals in a small space poses ethical issues to some consumers. Animal rights and animal welfare activists have charged that intensive animal rearing is cruel to animals. As they become more common, so do concerns about air pollution and ground water contamination, and the effects on human health of the pollution and the use of antibiotics and growth hormones.

According to the U.S. Centers for Disease Control and Prevention (CDC), farms on which animals are intensively reared can cause adverse health reactions in farm workers. Workers may develop acute and chronic lung disease, musculoskeletal injuries, and may catch infections that transmit from animals to human beings. These types of transmissions, however, are extremely rare, as zoonotic diseases are uncommon.

== Crops ==
The projects within the Green Revolution spread technologies that had already existed, but had not been widely used outside of industrialized nations. These technologies included pesticides, irrigation projects and synthetic nitrogen fertilizer.

The novel technological development of the Green Revolution was the production of what some referred to as "miracle seeds." Scientists created strains of maize, wheat and rice that are generally referred to as HYVs or "high-yielding varieties." HYVs have an increased nitrogen-absorbing potential compared to other varieties. Since cereals that absorbed extra nitrogen would typically lodge, or fall over before harvest, semi-dwarfing genes were bred into their genomes. Norin 10 wheat, a variety developed by Orville Vogel from Japanese dwarf wheat varieties, was instrumental in developing Green Revolution wheat cultivars. IR8, the first widely implemented HYV rice to be developed by the International Rice Research Institute, was created through a cross between an Indonesian variety named "Peta" and a Chinese variety named "Dee Geo Woo Gen."

With the availability of molecular genetics in Arabidopsis and rice the mutant genes responsible (reduced height(rh), gibberellin insensitive (gai1) and slender rice (slr1)) have been cloned and identified as cellular signaling components of gibberellic acid, a phytohormone involved in regulating stem growth via its effect on cell division. Stem growth in the mutant background is significantly reduced leading to the dwarf phenotype. Photosynthetic investment in the stem is reduced dramatically as the shorter plants are inherently more stable mechanically. Assimilates become redirected to grain production, amplifying in particular the effect of chemical fertilizers on commercial yield.

HYVs significantly outperform traditional varieties in the presence of adequate irrigation, pesticides and fertilizers. In the absence of these inputs, traditional varieties may outperform HYVs. One criticism of HYVs is that they were developed as F1 hybrids, meaning they need to be purchased by a farmer every season rather than saved from previous seasons, thus increasing a farmer's cost of production.

== Sustainable agriculture ==
The idea and practice of sustainable agriculture has arisen in response to the problems of industrial agriculture. Sustainable agriculture integrates three main goals: environmental stewardship, farm profitability and prosperous farming communities. These goals have been defined by a variety of disciplines and may be looked at from the vantage point of the farmer or the consumer.

=== Organic farming methods ===
Organic farming methods combine some aspects of scientific knowledge and highly limited modern technology with traditional farming practices; accepting some of the methods of industrial agriculture while rejecting others. Organic methods rely on naturally occurring biological processes, which often take place over extended periods of time, and a holistic approach; while chemical-based farming focuses on immediate, isolated effects and reductionist strategies.

Integrated Multi-Trophic Aquaculture is an example of this holistic approach. Integrated Multi-Trophic Aquaculture (IMTA) is a practice in which the by-products (wastes) from one species are recycled to become inputs (fertilizers, food) for another. Fed aquaculture (e.g. fish, shrimp) is combined with inorganic extractive (e.g. seaweed) and organic extractive (e.g. shellfish) aquaculture to create balanced systems for environmental sustainability (bio-mitigation), economic stability (product diversification and risk reduction) and social acceptability (better management practices).

== See also ==
- Agrochemical
- Agroextractivism
