= Industrial food =

Industrial food can refer to:

- Convenience food, also known as (tertiary) processed food — food that is commercially prepared (often through processing) to optimise ease of consumption
- Food industry, a diverse collection of businesses that supply most of the food consumed by the world's population
- Intensive farming or industrial agriculture, various types of, often highly mechanised, agriculture with higher levels of input and output than traditional methods
  - Factory farming, also known as intensive animal farming and industrial livestock production - a production approach towards farm animals in order to maximize production output, while minimizing production costs
  - Intensive crop farming, the industrialized production of crops

== See also ==
- Agribusiness
- Mechanised agriculture
- Food processing
- Industrial Revolution
