= Lifting-wing multicopter =

Combination of lifting wing and multirotor

Lifting-wing multicopter is a combination of lifting wing and multirotor. The plane of the rotor disc and lifting wing are installed at a fixed angle (for example, about 30-45 degrees), which greatly improves the forward flight efficiency while retaining the simple and reliable structure of multicopter and wind resistance. The unique layout is significantly different from the existing conventional vertical takeoff and landing aircraft such as tail-sitter aircraft and convertiplane.

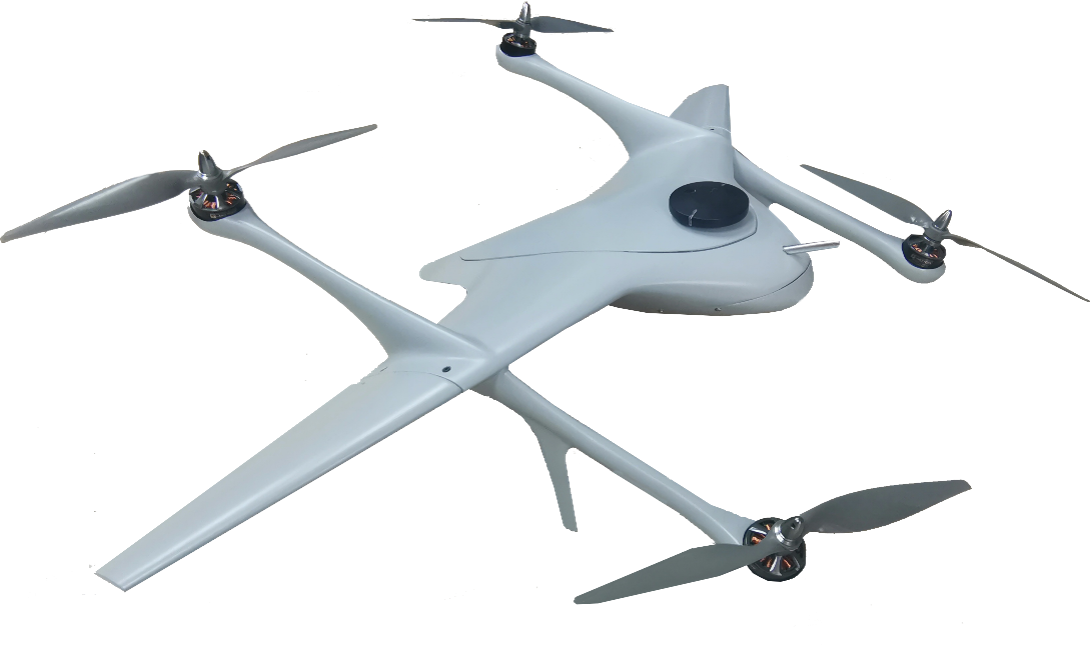
The lifting-wing multicopter designed by the reliable flight control group of Beihang University

At present, almost all aircraft are in multicopter mode or fixed-wing mode most of the time, while the lifting-wing multicopter is always in the mixed phase of multicopter mode and fixed-wing mode. Compared with traditional fixed-wing and convertiplane, the short wing and strong rotor of the lifting-wing multicopter make it have strong wind resistance.

== History ==
In 2015, the University of Leuven, Belgium, proposed a hybrid configuration aircraft with a lifting-wing structure, named VertiKUL2, whose wing and the rotor are installed at 45 degrees to improve wind resistance.

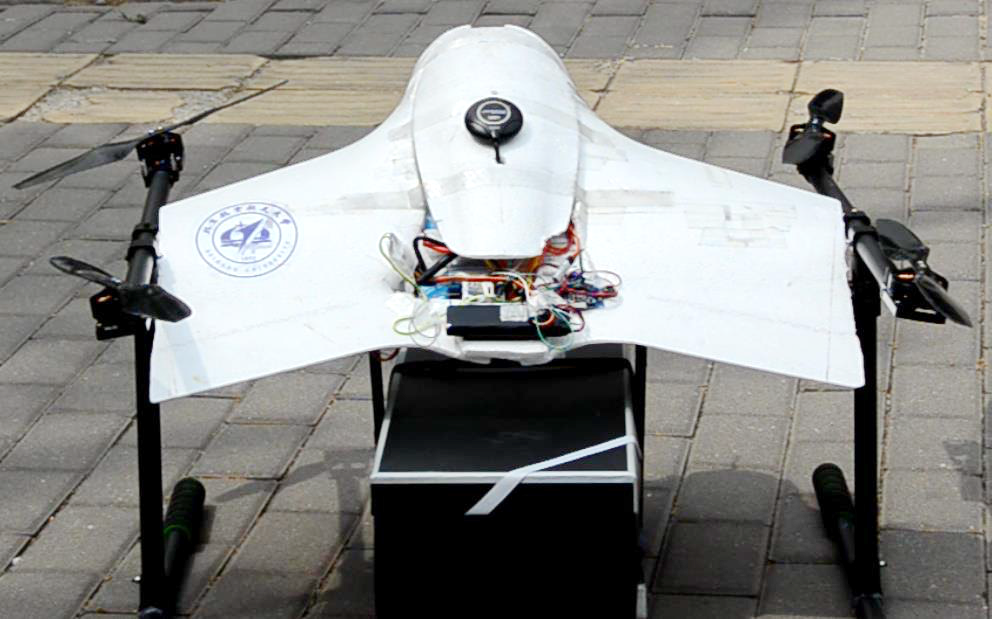
The prototype of the lifting-wing multicopter.png

The reliable flight control group of Beihang University https://rfly.buaa.edu.cn/ formally proposed the lifting-wing multicopter configuration in 2018, and began the design and basic performance verification of the prototype of the lifting-wing multicopter. Compared with the traditional multicopter, it was concluded that the power consumption of the lifting-wing multicopter could be reduced by about 50% within a certain cruise speed range through experiments.

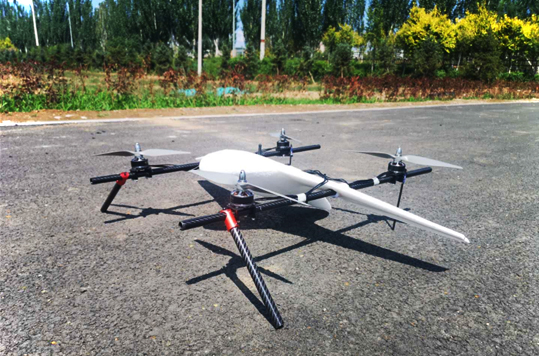
The lifting-wing multicopter designed by the reliable flight control group of Beihang University

In 2019, the reliable flight control group of Beihang University began the design of the lifting-wing multicopter, proposed evaluation methods for range and transition time performance, and established a comprehensive model for it. Based on this, flight experiments were carried out and the expected results were achieved.

In 2019, VOLITATION designed a multicopter with lifting wing, named VesperTilio.

In the same year, Amazon designed Prime Air for delivery.

Starting in 2022, the Reliable Flight Control Research Group at Beihang University has conducted a series of control experiments on lifting-wing multicopters, such as experiments validating a unified controller, precise trajectory tracking experiments, bio-inspired high-agility flip maneuvers for obstacle avoidance, disturbance and wind rejection experiments, propeller failure tolerant control experiments, and related research on tethered lifting-wing multicopters.

== Characteristics ==
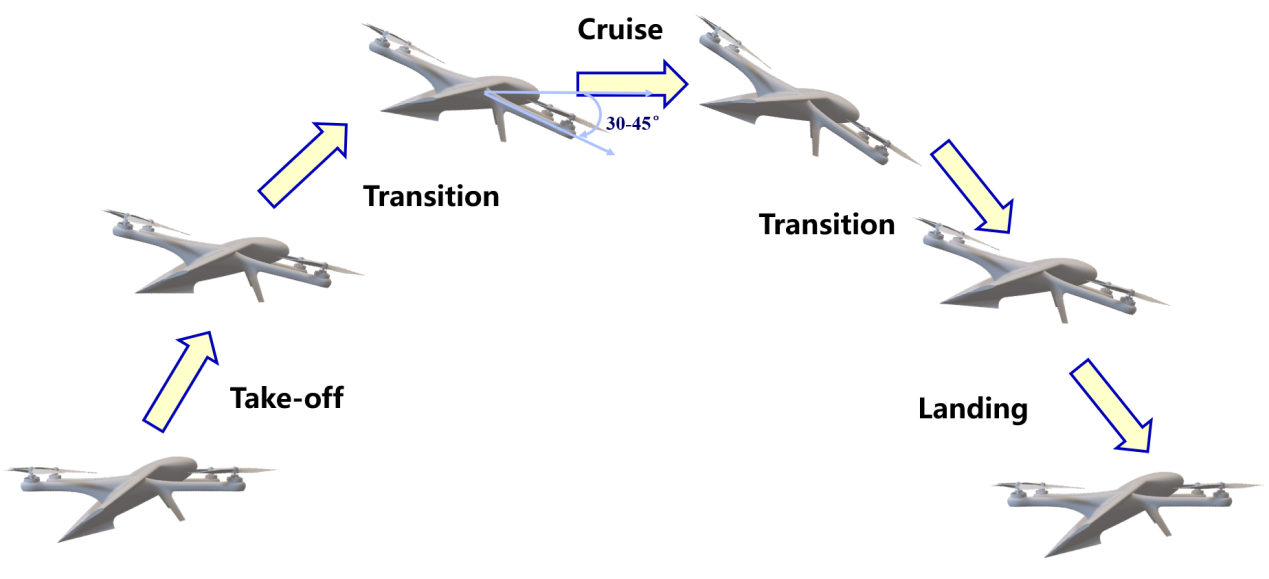
Flight process of lifting-wing multicopters English

The lifting-wing multicopter is very different from the common hybrid UAV in control. It can smoothly transition from hovering to forward flight. During the forward flight, the rotors can provide the forward force and part of lift of the UAV, while the other part of lift is provided by the lifting wing. At the same time, the lifting wing's optimized design reduces the UAV's center of gravity, enhances stability, and avoids the danger of toppling due to the large windward surface when landing. Because of the advantages of the lifting-wing multicopter, its airframe design and flight control design are more complex than those of convertiplane and tail-sitter aircraft, but its use efficiency is significantly better than the latter.

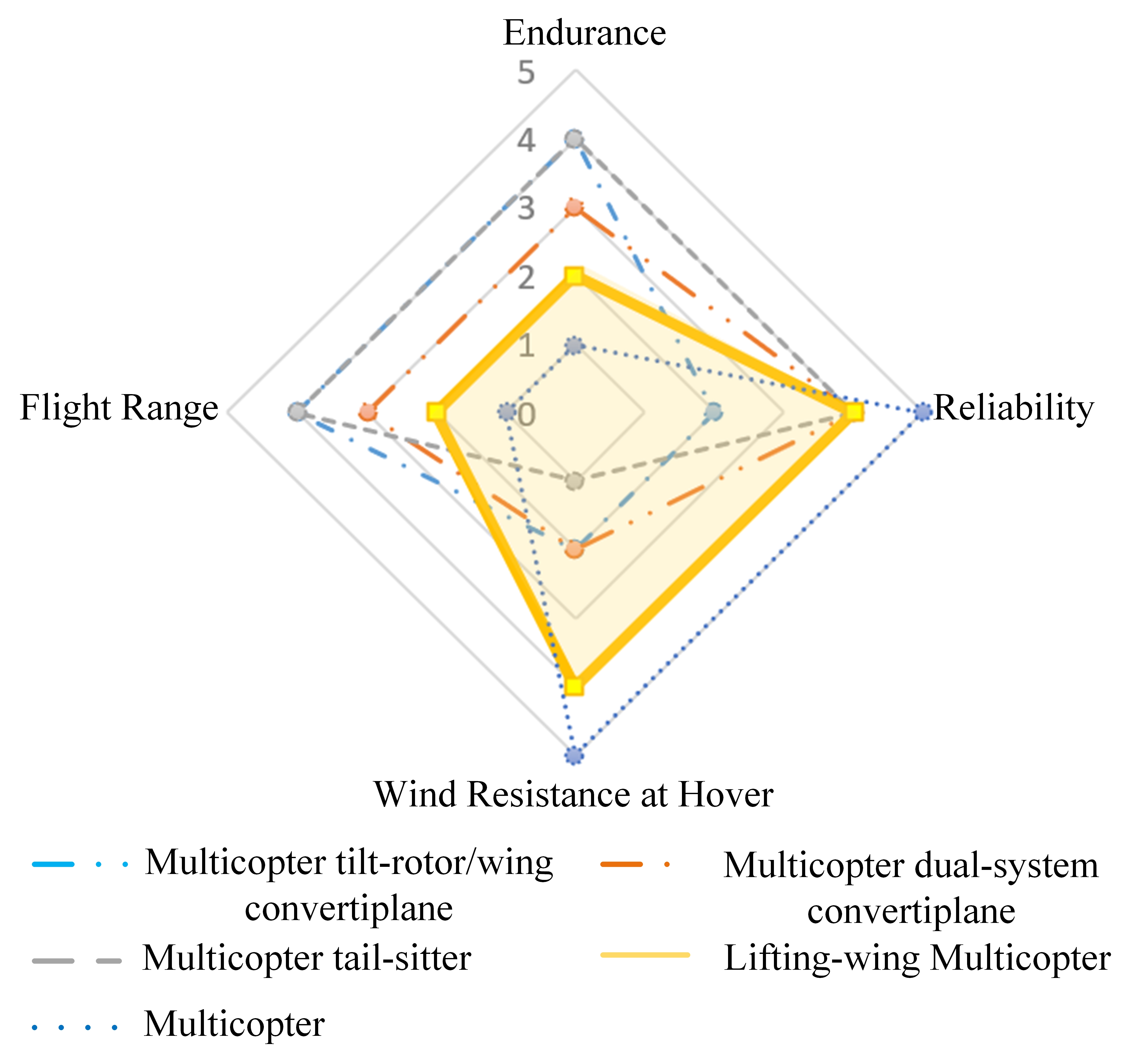
Performance comparison between the lifting-wing multicopter and other typical hybrid aircraft English

Compared with the traditional multicopter, convertiplane, and tail-sitter aircraft, the lifting-wing multicopter has a relatively compromised performance, which is a supplement to the current hybrid UAV.

== Control ==
The reliable flight control group of Beihang University has designed a unified controller for the lifting-wing multicopter in the full flight stage, and rotors and ailerons on the lifting wing work together to save energy.

Unified control for full flight phases. Hybrid UAVs often have three different flight status, including the hover, the transition flight, and the forward flight. By taking the multicopter tilt-rotor/wing convertiplane, multicopter dual-system convertiplane and multicopter tail-sitter for example, their take-off and landing are controlled only by the quadcopter component, while the forward flight is controlled like a fixed-wing aircraft. The two control ways are very different, so the transition flight is challenging due to the nonlinearities and uncertainties. However, a full flight phase of the lifting-wing quadcopter always involves thrust by the quadcopter and aerodynamic force by the lifting wing. Therefore, the lifting-wing quadcopter can be considered under only the transition flight mode in the full flight phase (hover control here also will take the aerodynamic force into consideration due to wind on the lifting wing). As a result, a unified control is needed. Fortunately, the lifting-wing quadcopter only needs to tilt a specific angle often smaller than 45 degrees, rather than 90 degrees like tail sitter UAVs. This reduces the possibility of having a stall.

Cooperative control for energy saving. The transition flight for current hybrid UAVs is very short, so not too much attention needs to pay to energy consumption in practice. However, it should be considered for the lifting-wing quadcopter as it is under the transition flight mode in the full flight phase. Cooperative control for energy saving is feasible. For example, roll control can be performed by both the quadcopter component and the ailerons by the lifting wing. Obviously, the aileron control is more energy-saving.
