= Farming systems in India =

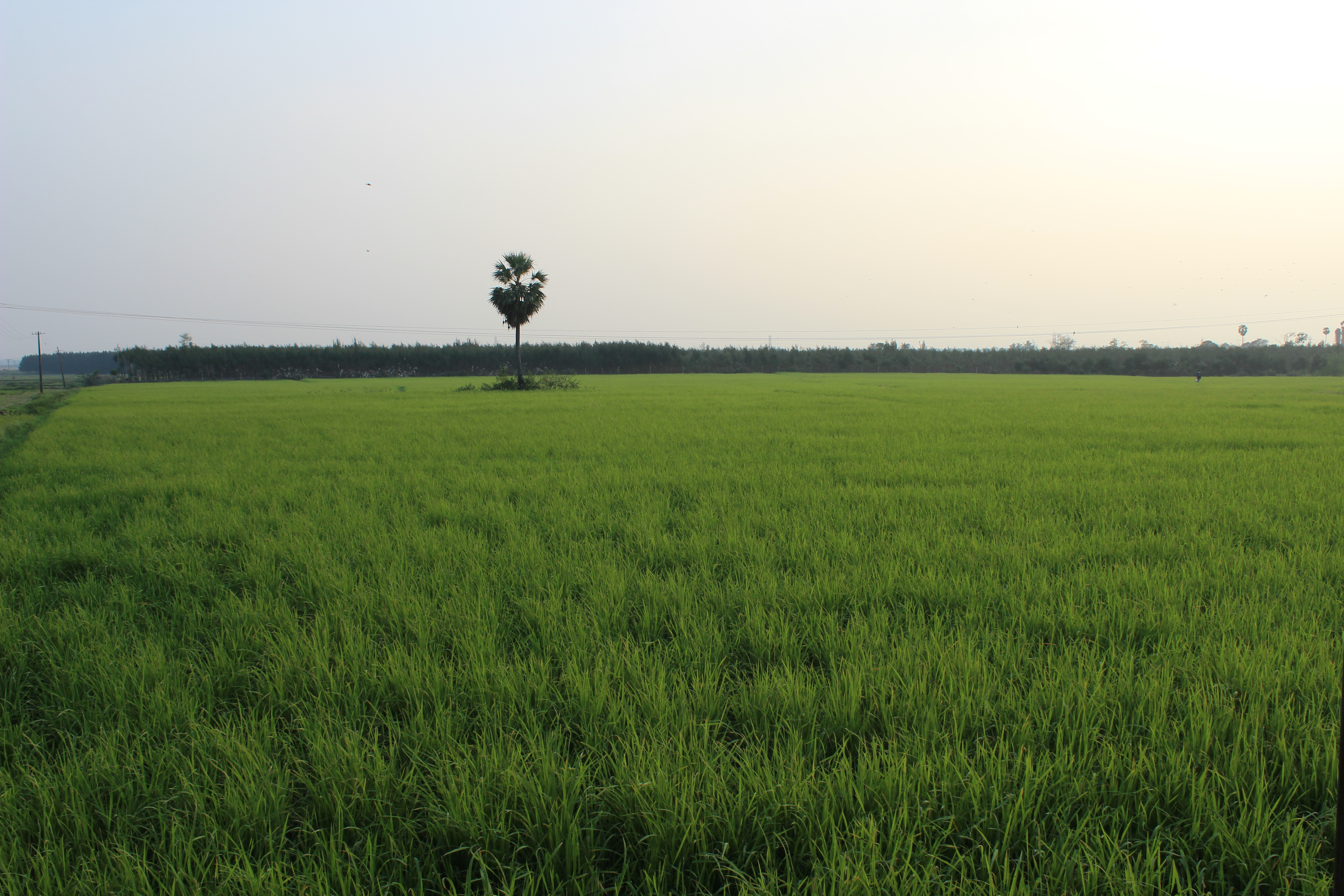
Rice semi-paddy fields in Tamil Nadu

Farming systems in India are strategically utilized, according to the locations where they are most suitable. The farming systems that significantly contribute to the agriculture of India are subsistence farming, organic farming and industrial farming. Regions throughout India differ in the types of farming they use; some are based on horticulture, ley farming, agroforestry, and many more. Due to India's geographical location, certain parts experience different climates, thus affecting each region's agricultural productivity differently. India is very dependent on its monsoon cycle for large crop yields. India's agriculture has an extensive background which goes back to at least 9 thousand years. In India, in the alluvial plains of the Indus River in Pakistan, the old cities of Mohenjo-Daro and Harappa experienced an apparent establishment of an organized farming urban culture. That society, known as the Harappan or Indus civilization, flourished until shortly after 4000 BP; it was much more comprehensive than those of Egypt or Babylonia and appeared earlier than analogous societies in northern China. Currently, the country holds the second position in agricultural production in the world. In 2007, agriculture and other industries made up more than 16% of India's GDP. Despite the steady decline in agriculture's contribution to the country's GDP, agriculture is the biggest industry in the country and plays a key role in the socio-economic growth of the country. India is the second-largest producer of wheat, rice, cotton, sugarcane, silk, groundnuts, and dozens more. It is also the second biggest harvester of vegetables and fruit, representing 8.6% and 10.9% of overall production, respectively. The major fruits produced by India are mangoes, papayas, sapota, and bananas. India also has the biggest number of livestock in the world, holding 281 million. In 2008, the country housed the second-largest number of cattle in the world with 175 million.

== Climate effect on farming systems ==
Each region in India has a specific soil and climate that is only suitable for certain types of farming. Many regions on the western side of India experience less than 50 cm of rain annually, so the farming systems are restricted to cultivating crops that can withstand drought conditions and farmers are usually restricted to single cropping. Gujarat, Rajasthan, Punjab, and northern Maharashtra all experience this climate and each region grows suitable crops like jowar, bajra, and peas. In contrast, the eastern side of India has an average of 100–200 cm of rainfall annually without irrigation, so these regions can double the crop production. West Coast, West Bengal, parts of Bihar, U.P. and Assam are all associated with this climate and they grow crops such as rice, sugarcane, jute, and many more.

Climate regions of India

There are three different types of crops that are cultivated throughout India. Each type is grown in a different season depending on their compatibility with certain weather. Kharif crops are grown at the start of the monsoon until the beginning of the winter, relatively from June to November. Examples of such crops are rice, corn, millet, groundnut, moong, and urad. Rabi crops are winter crops that are sown in October -November months and harvested in February – March. Its typical examples are wheat, boro paddy, jowar, nuts, etc. The third type is Zaid crops which are summer crops. It is sown in February – March and harvested in May – June. Examples are aush paddy, vegetables, and jute.

== Irrigation farming ==
Irrigation farming is when crops are grown with the help of irrigation systems by supplying water to land through rivers, reservoirs, tanks, and wells. Over the last century, the population of India has tripled. With a growing population and increasing demand for food, the necessity of water for agricultural productivity is crucial. India faces the daunting task of increasing its food production by over 50 percent in the next two decades, and reaching the goal of sustainable agriculture requires a crucial role of water. Empirical evidence suggests that the increase in agricultural production in India is mostly due to irrigation; close to three-fifths of India's grain harvest comes from irrigated land. The land area under irrigation expanded from 22.6 million hectares in FY 1950 to 59 million hectares in FY 1990. The main strategy for these irrigation systems focuses on public investments in surface systems, such as large dams, long canals, and other large-scale works that require large amounts of capital. Between 1951 and 1990, nearly 1,350 large- and medium-sized irrigation works were started, and about 850 were completed.

=== Problems of irrigation ===
Because funds and technical expertise were in short supply, many projects moved forward at a slow pace, including The Indira Gandhi Canal project. The central government's transfer of huge amounts of water from Punjab to Haryana and Rajasthan contributed to the civil unrest in Punjab during the 1980s and early 1990s. Problems also have arisen as groundwater supplies used for irrigation face depletion. Drawing water off from one area to irrigate another often leads to increased salinity receiving water through irrigation are poorly managed or inadequately designed; the result often is too much water and water-logged fields incapable of production.

== Geography of irrigation in India ==
Irrigation farming is very important for crop cultivation in regions of seasonal or low rainfall. Western U.P., Punjab, Haryana, parts of Bihar, Orissa, A.P., Tamil Nadu, Karnataka, and other regions thrive on irrigation and generally practice multiple or double cropping. With irrigation, a large variety of crops can be produced such as rice, sugarcane, wheat and tobacco.

== Shifting cultivation ==
Shifting cultivation is a type of subsistence farming where a plot of land is cultivated for a few years until the crop yield declines due to soil exhaustion and the effects of pests and weeds. Once crop yield has stagnated, the plot of land is deserted and the ground is cleared by slash-and-burn methods, allowing the land to replenish. Crops like yarn, cassava, maize and potatoes are mostly grown. This type of cultivation is predominant in the eastern and north-eastern regions on hill slopes and in forest areas such as Assam, Meghalaya, Nagaland, Manipur, Tripura, Mizoram, Arunachal Pradesh, Madhya Pradesh, Orissa, and Andhra Pradesh. Crops such as rain-fed rice, corn, buckwheat, small millets, root crops, and vegetables are grown in this system. Eighty-five percent of the total cultivation in northeast India is by shifting cultivation. Due to the increasing requirement for cultivation of land, the cycle of cultivation followed by leaving land fallow has reduced from 25 to 30 years to 2–3 years. This significant drop in uncultivated land does not give the land enough time to return to its natural condition. Because of this, the resilience of the ecosystem is broken down and the land increasingly deteriorates

=== Shifting cultivations in Odisha ===
Odisha accounts for the largest area under shifting cultivation in India. Shifting cultivation is locally known as the Podu cultivation. More than 30,000 square km of land (about 1/5 land surface of Odisha) is under such cultivation. Shifting cultivation is prevalent in Kalahandi, Koraput, Phulbani and other southern and western districts. Tribal communities such as Kondha, Kutia Kondha, Dongaria Kondha, Lanjia Sauras, and Paraja are all involved in this practice. Many festivals and rituals revolve around the podu fields because the tribals view podu cultivation as more than just a means of their livelihood, they view it as a way of life. In the first year of podu cultivation, tribals sow kandlan (a variety of arhar dal). Sowing means spraying the seeds and is used at pre-monsoon time and the area is adequately protected. Yield differs from area to area depending on local climatic factors. After harvest, the land is left fallow. During the pre-monsoon, varieties of rice, corn, and ginger are also sown. Generally, after the third year, the tribals abandon this land and shift to new land. On the abandoned land, natural regeneration starts from the available rootstocks and seed banks. Bamboo grows naturally; along with many other climbers that regenerate. Generally, this land is not cultivated for the next ten years.

Frequent shifting from one land to the other has affected the ecology of these regions. The area under natural forest has declined; the fragmentation of habitat, local disappearance of native species and invasion by exotic weeds and other plants are some of the other environmental consequences of shifting agriculture. Areas that have a fallow cycle of 5 to 10 years are more vulnerable to weed invasion compared to 15-year cycles, which have more soil nutrients, a larger variety of species, and higher agronomic yield.

== Commercial agriculture ==
In a commercial-based agriculture, crops are raised in large-scale plantations or estates and shipped off to other countries for money. These systems are common in sparsely populated areas such as Gujarat, Punjab, Haryana, and Maharashtra. Wheat, cotton, sugarcane, and corn are all examples of crops grown commercially.

=== Types of commercial agriculture ===
Intensive commercial farming is a system of agriculture in which relatively large amounts of capital or labor are applied to relatively smaller areas of land. It is usually practiced where the population pressure is reducing the size of landholdings. West Bengal practices intensive commercial farming.

Extensive commercial farming is a system of agriculture in which relatively small amounts of capital or labor investment are applied to relatively large areas of land. At times, the land is left fallow to regain its fertility. It is mostly mechanized because of the cost and availability of labor. It usually occurs at the margin of the agricultural system, at a great distance from the market or on poor land of limited potential and is usually practiced in the tarai regions of southern Nepal. Crops grown are sugarcane, rice and wheat.

Plantation agriculture involves a large farm or estate usually in a tropical or sub-tropical country where crops are grown for sale in distant markets rather than local consumption.

Commercial grain farming is a response to farm mechanization and it is the major type of activity in the areas of low rainfall and low density of population where extensive farming is practiced. Crops are prone to the vagaries of weather and droughts, and monoculture of wheat is the general practice.

== Ley farming ==
With increases in both human and animal populations in the Indian arid zone, the demand for grain, fodder, and fuelwood is increasing. Agricultural production in this region is low due to the low and uneven distribution of rainfall (100–400 mm yr"1) and the low availability of essential mineral nutrients. These demands can be met only by increasing production levels of these Aridisols through the adoption of farming technologies that improve physical properties as well as the biological processes of these soils. Alternate farming systems are being sought for higher sustainable crop production at low input levels and to protect the soils from further degradation.

In India's drylands, ley farming is used as a way to restore soil fertility. It involves rotations of grasses and food grains in a specific area. It is now being promoted even more to encourage organic farming, especially in the drylands. Ley farming acts as insurance against crop failures by frequent droughts. Structurally related physical properties and biological processes of soil often change when different cropping systems, tillage, or management practices are used. Soil fertility can be increased and maintained by enhancing natural soil biological processes. Farming provides balanced nutrition for sustainable production through the continuous turnover of organic matter in the soil.

== Plantation farming ==
This extensive commercial system is characterized by the cultivation of a single cash crop in plantations of estates on a large scale. Because it is a capital-centered system, it is important to be technically advanced and have efficient methods of cultivation and tools including fertilizers and irrigation and transport facilities. Examples of this type of farming are the tea plantations in Assam and West Bengal, the coffee plantations in Karnataka, Kerala, and Tamil Nadu, and the rubber plantations in Kerala and Maharashtra.

=== Forestry ===
In contrast to a naturally regenerated forest, tree plantations are typically grown as even-aged monocultures, primarily for timber production. These plantations are also likely to contain tree species that would not naturally grow in the area. They may include unconventional types of trees such as hybrids, and genetically modified trees are likely to be used in the future. Plantation owners will grow trees that are best suited to industrial applications such as pine, spruce, and eucalyptus due to their fast growth rate, tolerance of rich or degraded agricultural land, and potential to produce large quantities of raw material for industrial use. Plantations are always young forests in ecological terms; this means that these forests don't contain the type of growth, soil or wildlife that is typical of old-growth natural ecosystems in a forest.

The replacement of natural forests with tree plantations has also caused social problems. In some countries, there is little concern or regard for the rights of the local people when replacing natural forests with plantations. Because these plantations are made solely for the production of one material, there is a much smaller range of services for the local people. India has taken measures to avoid this by limiting the amount of land that can be owned by someone. As a result, smaller plantations are owned by local farmers who then sell the wood to larger companies.

=== Teak and bamboo ===
Teak and bamboo plantations in India are a good alternative crop solution for farmers of central India, where conventional farming is popular. Due to rising input costs of farming, many farmers have grown teak and bamboo plantations because they only require water during the first two years. Bamboo, once planted, provides the farmer with output for 50 years until it flowers. Production of these two trees positively impacts and contributes to the climate change problem in India.

== Crop rotation ==
Crop rotation can be classified as a type of subsistence farming if there is an individual or communal farmer doing the labor and if the yield is solely for their consumption. It is characterized by different crops being alternately grown on the same land in a specific order to have more effective control of weeds, pests, diseases, and more economical utilization of soil fertility. In India, leguminous crops are grown alternately with wheat, barley, and mustard. An ideal cropping system should use natural resources efficiently, provide stable and high returns, and avoid environmental damage.

=== Different sequences of crop rotation ===
Rotation of two crops within a year i.e.:

Year 1: Wheat
Year 2: Barley
Year 3: Wheat again

Three crop rotation i.e.:

Year 1: Wheat
Year 2: Barley
Year 3: Mustard
Year 4: Wheat again

=== Pearl millet ===
Pearl millet crop is mostly grown as a rain-fed monsoon crop during kharif (June–July to September–November) and also as an irrigated hot weather (February–June) crop in north, central and south India. Pearl millet is often grown in rotation with sorghum, groundnut, cotton, foxtail millet, finger millet (ragi), castor, and sometimes, in south India with rice.

On the red and iron-rich soils of Karnataka, pearl millet and ragi rotation are practiced although pearl millet is not always grown annually.

Cluster bean – Pearl millet crop sequence with crop residue incorporation has significantly increased the productivity in the arid zone of Western Rajasthan where fallow – pearl millet/pearl millet after pearl millet crop sequence is practiced.

In Punjab, the dry-land rotation may be a small grain-millet-fallow. In irrigated lands, pearl millet is rotated with chickpea, fodder sorghum, and wheat.

In the dry and light soils of Rajasthan, southern Punjab and Haryana, and northern Gujarat, pearl millet is most often rotated with a pulse-like moth or mungbean, or is followed by fallow, sesame, potato, mustard, moth bean, and guar. Sesame crops may be low-yielding and may be replaced by castor or groundnut.

== Dairy farming ==
In 2001 India became the world leader in milk production with a production volume of 84 million tons. India has about three times as many dairy animals as the US, which produces around 75 million tons. Dairy farming is generally a type of subsistence farming system in India, especially in Haryana, the major producer of milk in the country. More than 40% of Indian farming households are engaged in milk production because it is a livestock enterprise in which they can engage with relative ease to improve their livelihoods. Regular milk sales allow them to move from subsistence to earning a market-based income. The structure of the livestock industry is globally changing and putting poorer livestock producers in danger because they will be crowded out and left behind. More than 40 million households in India are at least partially dependent on milk production, and developments in the dairy sector will have important repercussions on their livelihoods and rural poverty levels. Haryana was chosen to assess possible developments in the Indian dairy sector and to broadly identify areas of interventions that favor small-scale dairy producers. A methodology developed by the International Farm Comparison Network (IFCN) examined the impacts of change on milk prices, farm management and other market factors that affect the small-scale milk production systems, the whole farm and related household income.

== Co-operative farming ==
Co-operative farming refers to the pooling of farming resources such as fertilizers, pesticides, and farming equipment such as tractors. However, it generally excludes pooling of land unlike in collective farming where pooling of land is also done. Cooperative farming is a relatively new system in India. Its goal is to bring together all of the land resources of farmers in such an organized and united way so that they will be collected in a position to grow crops on all of the land to the best of the fertility of the land. This system has become an essential feature of India's Five Year Plans. There is immense scope for co-operative farming in India although the movement is as yet in its infancy. The progress of cooperative financing in India has been very slow. The reasons are fear of unemployment, attachment to the land, lack of proper propaganda renunciation of membership by farmers and the existence of fake societies.

Aaqua is a Farmer Knowledge Exchange.

== See also ==
- Agriculture in India
