= Cecil Salmon =

American agronomist (1885–1975)

Samuel Cecil Salmon (1885–1975) was an agronomist who was attached to the American occupying forces in Japan after World War II. He worked for the Agricultural Research Service and during his time in Japan, Salmon collected 16 varieties of wheat samples including a dwarf strain Norin 10 which later triggered the Green Revolution.

== Life and career ==
Salmon was born in South Dakota and received a B.S. degree from South Dakota State University, a M.S. degree from Kansas State University and a Ph.D. degree from the University of Minnesota.

He taught and conducted research on wheat production at Kansas State from 1913 to 1931. In 1931, he became Principal Agronomist in the United States Department of Agriculture (USDA) "Office of Cereal Crops and Diseases".

While serving as the cereal crops consultant with the U.S. Army of Occupation in Japan after World War II, Salmon noted the vigorous, productive semi-dwarf wheats developed in Japan. He collected 16 varieties of the wheats including Norin 10 and sent seeds of those wheats to the USDA Small Grains Collection.

These seeds were used by Orville Vogel at Washington State University to develop the variety ‘Gaines,’ which holds the world record for wheat yields, and Norin 10 was used by International Maize and Wheat Improvement Center (CIMMYT) in Mexico to develop the varieties that started the Green Revolution.

Salmon went on to serve two years in the Philippines helping to rehabilitate the University of the Philippines College of Agriculture at Los Baños (UPLB) and undertook four tours with the U.S. Agency for International Development.

He co-authored several books on experimental design in agricultural research, including The principles and practice of agricultural research, published by L. Hill in 1964.

== See also ==
- Green Revolution
