= Hybrid drone =

Aircraft drone using multiple power sources

A Hybrid drone is a type of unmanned aerial vehicle using two or more energy sources to power its flight propulsion system.

UAV systems often use brushless DC electric motors as means of propulsion due to their high efficiency and great controllability, their main energy source is usually a LiPo battery with targets for battery packs for electric vehicles of 235 Wh/kg and 500 Wh/L in 2020.

With the present commercially available cells, the multirotor configurations can only sustain an average flight time of 20 to 30 minutes this limits the range of the operations and the usage of such aerial vehicles.

A common solution to this issue is adding a hybrid generator which usually consists of an internal combustion engine coupled with an electric machine, optimized to have a high power-to-weight ratio. The generator transforms the chemical energy stored inside the fuel by converting it to mechanical energy, and then electrical which is then used to power the aircraft.

== Panoramics ==
Hybrid UAV systems have been developed over recent years, from the MIT prototype many have tried to implement the technology on their vehicles, with Quantum Systems being one of the first to produce a commercial unit capable of several hours of flight time, with the UAV community getting involved, Nicolai Valenti and Giovanni Nicola Mastronardo made the first European conversion kit for the installation of a hybrid generator on a conventional drone, a project which now acquired by Hitecs.

While those companies have been more focused on the electrical challenges such as using the same electrical machine both as an alternator and as a starter in order to save weight, other companies, such as Northwest UAV worked on perfecting small engines (44cc to 500cc) in order to improve the reliability of the hybrid system, which initially used almost exclusively hobby-grade engines (usually two-stroke).

The system is usually combined with a back-up energy source such as a Lithium polymer battery in order for the aircraft to be able to make a safe landing in the event of an engine failure.

== Examples ==
Hybrid drones are now used for long-range and heavy payload applications, such as SAR operations and crop management with some vehicles exceeding eight hours of flight time they are often more practical and cost-efficient than traditional aircraft.
