= Intensive crop farming =

Modern form of farming

Intensive crop farming is a modern industrialized form of crop farming. Intensive crop farming's methods include innovation in agricultural machinery, farming methods, genetic engineering technology, techniques for achieving economies of scale in production, the creation of new markets for consumption, patent protection of genetic information, and global trade. These methods are widespread in developed nations.

The practice of industrial agriculture is a relatively recent development in the history of agriculture, and the result of scientific discoveries and technological advances. Innovations in agriculture beginning in the late 19th century generally parallel developments in mass production in other industries that characterized the latter part of the Industrial Revolution. The identification of nitrogen and phosphorus as critical factors in plant growth led to the manufacture of synthetic fertilizers, making more intensive uses of farmland for crop production possible.

== Features ==
Certain crops have proven more amenable to intensive farming than others.

- large scale – hundreds or thousands of acres of a single crop (much more than can be absorbed into the local or regional market);
- monoculture – large areas of a single crop, often raised from year to year on the same land, or with little crop rotation;
- agrichemicals – reliance on imported, synthetic fertilizers and pesticides to provide nutrients and to mitigate pests and diseases, these applied on a regular schedule
- hybrid seed – use of specialized hybrids designed to favor large scale distribution (e.g. ability to ripen off the vine, to withstand shipping and handling);
- genetically engineered crops – use of genetically modified varieties designed for large scale production (e.g. ability to withstand selected herbicides);
- large scale irrigation – heavy water use, and in some cases, growing of crops in otherwise unsuitable regions by extreme use of water (e.g. rice paddies on arid land).
- high mechanization – automated machinery sustain and harvest crops.

== Criticism ==
Critics of intensively farmed crops cite a wide range of concerns. On the food quality front, it is held by critics that quality is reduced when crops are bred and grown primarily for cosmetic and shipping characteristics. Environmentally, industrial farming of crops is claimed to be responsible for loss of biodiversity, degradation of soil quality, soil erosion, food toxicity (pesticide residues) and pollution (through agrichemical build-ups and runoff, and use of fossil fuels for agrichemical manufacture and for farm machinery and long-distance distribution).

== History ==
The projects within the Green Revolution spread technologies that had already existed, but had not been widely used outside of industrialized nations. These technologies included pesticides, irrigation projects, and synthetic nitrogen fertilizer.

The novel technological development of the Green Revolution was the production of what some referred to as “miracle seeds.” Scientists created strains of maize, wheat, and rice that are generally referred to as HYVs or “high-yielding varieties.” HYVs have an increased nitrogen-absorbing potential compared to other varieties. Since cereals that absorbed extra nitrogen would typically lodge, or fall over before harvest, semi-dwarfing genes were bred into their genomes. Norin 10 wheat, a variety developed by Orville Vogel from Japanese dwarf wheat varieties, was instrumental in developing Green Revolution wheat cultivars. IR8, the first widely implemented HYV rice to be developed by IRRI, was created through a cross between an Indonesian variety named “Peta” and a Chinese variety named “Dee Geo Woo Gen.”

With the availability of molecular genetics in Arabidopsis and rice the mutant genes responsible (reduced height(rht), gibberellin insensitive (gai1) and slender rice (slr1)) have been cloned and identified as cellular signalling components of gibberellic acid, a phytohormone involved in regulating stem growth via its effect on cell division. Stem growth in the mutant background is significantly reduced leading to the dwarf phenotype. Photosynthetic investment in the stem is reduced dramatically as the shorter plants are inherently more stable mechanically. Assimilates become redirected to grain production, amplifying in particular the effect of chemical fertilisers on commercial yield.

HYVs significantly outperform traditional varieties in the presence of adequate irrigation, pesticides, and fertilizers. In the absence of these inputs, traditional varieties may outperform HYVs. One criticism of HYVs is that they were developed as F1 hybrids, meaning they need to be purchased by a farmer every season rather than saved from previous seasons, thus increasing a farmer's cost of production.

== Examples ==
=== Wheat (modern management techniques) ===
Wheat is a grass that is cultivated worldwide. Globally, it is the most important human food grain and ranks second in total production as a cereal crop behind maize; the third being rice. Wheat and barley were the first cereals known to have been domesticated. Cultivation and repeated harvesting and sowing of the grains of wild grasses led to the domestication of wheat through selection of mutant forms with tough years which remained intact during harvesting, and larger grains. Because of the loss of seed dispersal mechanisms, domesticated wheats have limited capacity to propagate in the wild.

Agricultural cultivation using horse collar leveraged plows (3000 years ago) increased cereal grain productivity yields, as did the use of seed drills which replaced broadcasting sowing of seed in the 18th century. Yields of wheat continued to increase, as new land came under cultivation and with improved agricultural husbandry involving the use of fertilizers, threshing machines and reaping machines (the 'combine harvester'), tractor-draw cultivators and planters, and better varieties (see Green Revolution and Norin 10 wheat). With population growth rates falling, while yields continue to rise, the area devoted to wheat may now begin to decline for the first time in modern human history.

While winter wheat lies dormant during a winter freeze, wheat normally requires between 110 and 130 days between planting and harvest, depending upon climate, seed type, and soil conditions. Crop management decisions require the knowledge of stage of development of the crop. In particular, spring fertilizers applications, herbicides, fungicides, growth regulators are typically applied at specific stages of plant development. For example, current recommendations often indicate the second application of nitrogen be done when the ear (not visible at this stage) is about 1 cm in size (Z31 on Zadoks scale).

=== Maize (mechanical harvesting) ===
Maize was planted by the Native Americans in hills, in a complex system known to some as the Three Sisters: beans used the corn plant for support, and squashes provided ground cover to stop weeds. This method was replaced by single species hill planting where each hill 60–120 cm (2–4 ft) apart was planted with 3 or 4 seeds, a method still used by home gardeners. A later technique was checked corn where hills were placed 40 inches (1,000 mm) apart in each direction, allowing cultivators to run through the field in two directions. In more arid lands this was altered and seeds were planted in the bottom of 10–12 cm (4–5 in) deep furrows to collect water. Modern technique plants maize in rows which allows for cultivation while the plant is young, although the hill technique is still used in the cornfields of some Native American reservations. The Haudenosaunee are preparing for climate change through seed banking. With a climate changing more crops are able to grow in different areas that they previously weren't able to. This will open growing areas for maize.

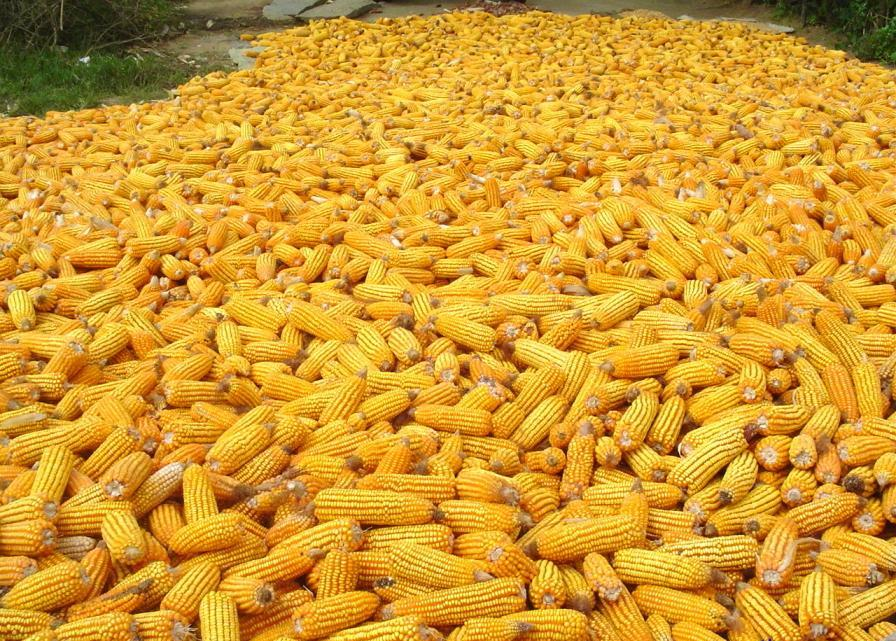
A corn heap at the harvest site, India

In North America, fields are often planted in a two-crop rotation with a nitrogen-fixing crop, often alfalfa in cooler climates and soybeans in regions with longer summers. Sometimes a third crop, winter wheat, is added to the rotation. Fields are usually plowed each year, although no-till farming is increasing in use. Many of the maize varieties grown in the United States and Canada are hybrids. Over half of the corn area planted in the United States has been genetically modified using biotechnology to express agronomic traits such as pest resistance or herbicide resistance.

Before about World War II, most maize in North America was harvested by hand (as it still is in most of the other countries where it is grown). This often involved large numbers of workers and associated social events. Some one- and two-row mechanical pickers were in use but the corn combine was not adopted until after the War. By hand or mechanical picker, the entire ear is harvested which then requires a separate operation of a corn sheller to remove the kernels from the ear. Whole ears of corn were often stored in corn cribs and these whole ears are a sufficient form for some livestock feeding use. Few modern farms store maize in this manner. Most harvest the grain from the field and store it in bins. The combine with a corn head (with points and snap rolls instead of a reel) does not cut the stalk; it simply pulls the stalk down. The stalk continues downward and is crumpled into a mangled pile on the ground. The ear of corn is too large to pass through a slit in a plate and the snap rolls pull the ear of corn from the stalk so that only the ear and husk enter the machinery. The combine separates the husk and the cob, keeping only the kernels.

=== Soybean (genetic modification) ===
Soybeans are one of the "biotech food" crops that are being genetically modified, and GMO soybeans are being used in an increasing number of products. Monsanto Company is the world's leader in genetically modified soy for the commercial market. In 1995, Monsanto introduced "Roundup Ready" (RR) soybeans that have had a copy of a gene from the bacterium, Agrobacterium sp. strain CP4, inserted, by means of a gene gun, into its genome that allows the transgenic plant to survive being sprayed by this non-selective herbicide, glyphosate. Glyphosate, the active ingredient in Roundup, kills conventional soybeans. The bacterial gene is EPSP (= 5-enolpyruvyl shikimic acid-3-phosphate) synthase. Soybean also has a version of this gene, but the soybean version is sensitive to glyphosate, while the CP4 version is not.

RR soybeans allow a farmer to reduce tillage or even to sow the seed directly into an unplowed field, known as 'no-till' or conservation tillage. No-till agriculture has many advantages, greatly reducing soil erosion and creating better wildlife habitat; it also saves fossil fuels, and sequesters CO_{2}, a greenhouse effect gas.

In 1997, about 8% of all soybeans cultivated for the commercial market in the United States were genetically modified. In 2006, the figure was 89%. As with other "Roundup Ready crops", concern is expressed over damage to biodiversity. However, the RR gene has been bred into so many different soybean cultivars that the genetic modification itself has not resulted in any decline of genetic diversity.

=== Tomato (hydroponics) ===
The largest commercial hydroponics facility in the world is Eurofresh Farms in Willcox, Arizona, which sold more than 200 million pounds of tomatoes in 2007. Eurofresh has 318 acres (1.3 km^{2}) under glass and represents about a third of the commercial hydroponic greenhouse area in the U.S. Eurofresh does not consider their tomatoes organic, but they are pesticide-free. They are grown in rockwool with top irrigation.

Some commercial installations use no pesticides or herbicides, preferring integrated pest management techniques. There is often a price premium willingly paid by consumers for produce which is labeled "organic". Some states in the USA require soil as an essential to obtain organic certification. There are also overlapping and somewhat contradictory rules established by the US Federal Government. So some food grown with hydroponics can be certified organic. In fact, they are the cleanest plants possible because there is no environment variable and the dirt in the food supply is extremely limited. Hydroponics also saves an incredible amount of water; It uses as little as 1/20 the amount as a regular farm to produce the same amount of food. The water table can be impacted by the water use and run-off of chemicals from farms, but hydroponics may minimize impact as well as having the advantage that water use and water returns are easier to measure. This can save the farmer money by allowing reduced water use and the ability to measure consequences to the land around a farm.

The environment in a hydroponics greenhouse is tightly controlled for maximum efficiency and this new mindset is called soil-less/controlled-environment agriculture (S/CEA). With this, food can be grown regardless of temperature and growing seasons. Growers monitor the temperature, humidity, and pH level constantly.

== See also ==
- Intensive animal farming
- Environmental impact of agriculture
- Climate change
- Non-food crop
