= Green Revolution =

Agricultural developments in 1950s–1960s

Change in cereal production, yield, land use and population, World

The Green Revolution, or the Third Agricultural Revolution, was a period during which technology transfer initiatives resulted in a significant increase in crop yields. These changes in agriculture initially emerged in developed countries in the early 20th century and subsequently spread globally until the late 1980s. In the late 1980s, farmers began incorporating new technologies, including high-yielding varieties of cereals, particularly dwarf wheat and rice, and the widespread use of chemical fertilizers (to produce their high yields, the new seeds require far more fertilizer than traditional varieties), pesticides, and controlled irrigation.

At the same time, newer methods of cultivation, including mechanization, were adopted, often as a package of practices to replace traditional agricultural technology. This was often in conjunction with loans conditional on policy changes being made by the developing nations adopting them, such as privatizing fertilizer manufacture and distribution.

Both the Ford Foundation and the Rockefeller Foundation were heavily involved in its initial development in Mexico. A key leader was agricultural scientist Norman Borlaug, the "Father of the Green Revolution", who received the Nobel Peace Prize in 1970. He is credited with saving over a billion people from starvation. Another important scientific figure was Yuan Longping, whose work on hybrid rice varieties is credited with saving at least as many lives. The basic approach was the development of high-yielding varieties of cereal grains, expansion of irrigation infrastructure, modernization of management techniques, distribution of hybridized seeds, synthetic fertilizers, and pesticides to farmers. As crops began to reach the maximum improvement possible through selective breeding, genetic modification technologies were developed to allow for continued efforts.

Studies show that the Green Revolution contributed to widespread eradication of poverty, averted hunger for millions, raised incomes, limited the increase of greenhouse gas emissions, reduced land use for agriculture, and contributed to declines in infant mortality.

== History ==
=== Use of the term ===
The term "Green Revolution" was first used by William S. Gaud, the administrator of the U.S. Agency for International Development (USAID), in a speech on 8 March 1968. He noted the spread of the new technologies as:

These and other developments in the field of agriculture contain the makings of a new revolution. It is not a violent Red Revolution like that of the Soviets, nor is it a White Revolution like that of the Shah of Iran. I call it the Green Revolution.

=== Development in Mexico ===
Change in cereal production, yield, land use and population, Mexico

Mexico has been called the 'birthplace' and 'burial ground' of the Green Revolution. It began with great promise and it has been argued that "during the twentieth century two 'revolutions' transformed rural Mexico: the Mexican Revolution (1910–1920) and the Green Revolution (1940–1970)."

The genesis of the Green Revolution was a lengthy visit in 1940 by U.S. Vice President-elect Henry A. Wallace, who had served as U.S. Secretary of Agriculture during President Franklin Roosevelt's first two terms, and before government service, had founded a company, Pioneer Hi-Bred International, that had revolutionized the hybridization of seed corn to greatly increase crop yields. He became appalled at the meager corn yields in Mexico, where 80 percent of the people lived off the land, and a Mexican farmer had to work as much as 500 hours to produce a single bushel of corn, about 50 times longer than the typical Iowa farmer planting hybrid seed. Wallace persuaded the Rockefeller Foundation to fund an agricultural station in Mexico to hybridize corn and wheat for arid climates, and to lead it, he hired a young Iowa agronomist named Norman Borlaug.

The project was supported by the Mexican government under new President Manuel Ávila Camacho, and the U.S. government, the United Nations, and the Food and Agriculture Organization (FAO). For the U.S. government, its neighbor Mexico was an important experimental case in the use of technology and scientific expertise in agriculture that became the model for international agricultural development. Mexico sought to transform agricultural productivity, particularly with irrigated rather than dry-land cultivation in its northwest, to solve its problem of lack of food self-sufficiency. In the center and south of Mexico, where large-scale production faced challenges, agricultural production languished. Increased production promised food self-sufficiency in Mexico to feed its growing and urbanizing population with the increase in a number of calories consumed per Mexican. The science of hybridization was seen as a valuable way to feed the poor and would relieve some pressure of the land redistribution process. In general, the success of "Green Revolution" depended on the use of machinery for cultivation and harvest, on large-scale agricultural enterprises with access to credit (often from foreign investors), government-supported infrastructure projects, and access to low-wage agricultural workers.

Within eight years of Wallace's visit, Mexico had no need to import food, for the first time since 1910; within 20 years, corn production had tripled, and wheat production had increased five-fold. In 1943, Mexico imported half of its wheat requirements, however by 1956 it had become self-sufficient and it was exporting half a million tons of wheat by 1964. Within 30 years, Borlaug was awarded the Nobel Peace Prize for ultimately saving one billion people from starvation.

Mexico was the recipient of knowledge and technology of the Green Revolution, and it was an active participant with financial supports from the government for agriculture and Mexican agronomists. In the aftermath of the Mexican Revolution, the government had redistributed land to ejidatarios in some parts of the country which had broken the back of the hacienda system. During the presidency of Lázaro Cárdenas (1934–1940), land reform in Mexico reached its apex in the center and south of Mexico. Agricultural productivity had fallen significantly by the 1940s.

After Borlaug's agricultural station was established, in 1941, a team of U.S. scientists, Richard Bradfield (Cornell University), Paul C. Mangelsdorf (Harvard University), and Elvin Charles Stakman (under whom Borlaug had studied at the University of Minnesota) surveyed Mexican agriculture to recommend policies and practices. In 1943, the Mexican government founded the International Maize and Wheat Improvement Center (CIMMYT), which became a base for international agricultural research.

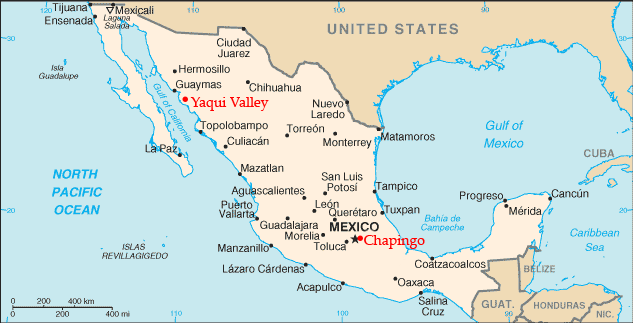
Locations of Norman Borlaug's research stations in the Yaqui Valley and Chapingo.

Agriculture in Mexico had been a sociopolitical issue, a key factor in some regions' participation in the Mexican Revolution. It was also a technical issue enabled by a cohort of trained agronomists who advised ejidatarios on how to increase productivity. In the post-World War II era, the government sought development in agriculture that bettered technological aspects of agriculture in regions not dominated by small-scale ejido cultivators. This drive for agricultural transformation brought Mexico self-sufficiency in food, and in the political sphere during the Cold War, helped stem unrest and the appeal of Communism.

The Mexican government created the Mexican Agricultural Program (MAP) to be the lead organization in raising productivity. Mexico became the showcase for extending the Green Revolution to other areas of Latin America and beyond, into Africa and Asia. New breeds of maize, beans, and wheat produced bumper crops with additional inputs (such as fertilizer and pesticides) and careful cultivation. Many Mexican farmers who had been dubious about the scientists or hostile to them (often a mutual relationship of discord) came to see the scientific approach to agriculture as worth adopting.

The requirements for the full package of inputs of new strains of seeds, fertilizer, synthetic pesticides, and water were often not within the reach of small-scale farmers. The application of pesticides could be hazardous for farmers. Their use often damaged the local ecology, contaminating waterways and endangering the health of workers and newborns.

One of the participants in the Mexican experiment, Edwin J. Wellhausen, summarized the factors leading to its initial success. These include: high yield plants without disease resistivity, adaptability, and ability to use fertilizers; improved use of soils, adequate fertilizers, and control of weeds and pests; and "a favorable ratio between the cost of fertilizers (and other investments) to the price of the produce."

=== IR8 rice and the Philippines ===
In 1960 during the administration of President Carlos P. Garcia the Government of the Republic of the Philippines with the Ford Foundation and the Rockefeller Foundation established the International Rice Research Institute (IRRI). A rice crossing between Dee-Geo-woo-gen and Peta was done at IRRI in 1962. In 1966, one of the breeding lines became a new cultivar: IR8 rice. The administration of President Ferdinand Marcos made the promotion of IR8 the lynchpin of the Masagana 99 program, along with a credit program. The new variety required the use of fertilizers and pesticides but produced substantially higher yields than the traditional cultivars. Annual rice production in the Philippines increased from 3.7 to 7.7 million tons in two decades. The switch to IR8 rice made the Philippines a rice exporter for the first time in the 20th century, though imports still exceeded exports, according to data from the United Nations Food and Agriculture Organization. From 1966 to 1986, the Philippines imported around 2,679,000 metric tons and exported only 632,000 metric tons of milled rice. By 1980, however, problems with the credit scheme rendered the loans accessible only to rich landowners while leaving poor farmers in debt. The program was also noted to have become a vehicle of political patronage.

=== Start in India ===
Change in cereal production, yield, land use and population, India

In 1961, Norman Borlaug was invited to India by the adviser to the Indian Minister of Agriculture Dr. M. S. Swaminathan. Despite bureaucratic hurdles imposed by India's grain monopolies, the Ford Foundation and Indian government collaborated to import wheat seed from the International Maize and Wheat Improvement Center (CIMMYT). The state of Punjab was selected by the Indian government to be the first site to try the new crops because of its reliable water supply, the presence of Indus plains which make it one of the most fertile plains on earth, and a history of agricultural success. India began its own Green Revolution program of plant breeding, irrigation development, and financing of agrochemicals.

India soon adopted IR8 rice. In 1968, Indian agronomist S.K. De Datta published his findings that IR8 rice yielded about 5 tons per hectare with no fertilizer, and almost 10 tons per hectare under optimal conditions. This was 10 times the yield of traditional rice. IR8 was a success throughout Asia and dubbed the "Miracle Rice". IR8 was also developed into Semi-dwarf IR36.

In the 1960s, rice yields in India were about two tons per hectare; by the mid-1990s, they had risen to 6 tons per hectare. In the 1970s, rice cost about $550 a ton; in 2001, it cost under $200 a ton. India became one of the world's most successful rice producers, and is now a major rice exporter, shipping nearly 4.5 million tons in 2006.

=== Green Revolution in China ===
Change in cereal production, yield, land use and population, China

China's large and increasing population meant that increasing food production, principally rice, was a top priority for the Chinese government. When the People's Republic of China was established in 1949, the Chinese Communist Party made it a priority to pursue agricultural development. They sought to solve China's food security issues by focusing on traditional crop production, biological pest control, the implementation of modern technology and science, creating food reserves for the population, high-yield seed varieties, multi-cropping, controlled irrigation, and protecting food security. This began with the Agrarian Reform Law of 1950, which ended private land ownership and gave land back to the peasants. Unlike with Mexico, the Philippines, India, or Brazil, the beginning of China's unique Green Revolution were unrelated to the American "Green Revolution." Rather, it was characterized by the government's sponsorship of agricultural research in concert with peasant knowledge and feedback, earlier international research, nature-based pest control and many other non-industrial agricultural practices, in order to feed the rapidly growing population.

Prominent in the development of productive hybrid rice was Yuan Longping, whose research hybridized wild strains of rice with existing strains. He has been dubbed "the father of hybrid rice", and was considered a national hero in China. Chinese rice production met the nation's food security needs, and today they are a leading exporter of rice. In recent years, however, extensive use of ground water for irrigation has drawn down aquifers and extensive use of fertilizers has increased greenhouse gas emissions. China has not expanded the area of cultivable land, China's unique high yields per hectare gave China the food security it sought. In 1979, there were 490 million Chinese people living in poverty. In 2014, there were only 82 million. Half of China's population had once been hungry and in poverty, but by 2014, only 6% remained so.

=== Brazil's agricultural revolution ===
Change in cereal production, yield, land use and population, Brazil

Brazil's vast inland cerrado region was regarded as unfit for farming before the 1960s because the soil was too acidic and poor in nutrients, according to Norman Borlaug. However, from the 1960s, vast quantities of lime (pulverized chalk or limestone) were poured on the soil to reduce acidity. The effort went on for decades; by the late 1990s, between 14 million and 16 million tons of lime were being spread on Brazilian fields each year. The quantity rose to 25 million tons in 2003 and 2004, equaling around five tons of lime per hectare. As a result, Brazil has become the world's second biggest soybean exporter. Soybeans are also widely used in animal feed, and the large volume of soy produced in Brazil has contributed to Brazil's rise to become the biggest exporter of beef and poultry in the world. Several parallels can also be found in Argentina's boom in soybean production as well.

=== Problems in Africa ===
Change in cereal production, yield, land use and population, Africa

There have been numerous attempts to introduce the successful concepts from the Mexican and Indian projects into Africa. These programs have generally been less successful. Reasons cited include widespread corruption, insecurity, a lack of infrastructure, and a general lack of will on the part of the governments. Yet environmental factors, such as the availability of water for irrigation, the high diversity in slope and soil types in one given area are also reasons why the Green Revolution is not so successful in Africa.

A recent program in western Africa is attempting to introduce a new high yielding 'family' of rice varieties known as "New Rice for Africa" (NERICA). NERICA varieties yield about 30% more rice under normal conditions and can double yields with small amounts of fertilizer and very basic irrigation. However, the program has been beset by problems getting the rice into the hands of farmers, and to date the only success has been in Guinea, where it currently accounts for 16% of rice cultivation.

After a famine in 2001 and years of chronic hunger and poverty, in 2005 the small African country of Malawi launched the "Agricultural Input Subsidy Program" by which vouchers are given to smallholder farmers to buy subsidized nitrogen fertilizer and corn seeds. Within its first year, the program was reported to have had extreme success, producing the largest corn harvest of the country's history, enough to feed the country with tons left over. The program has advanced yearly ever since. Various sources claim that the program has been an unusual success, hailing it as a "miracle". Malawi experienced a 40% drop in corn production in 2015 and 2016.

A 2021, a randomized control trial on temporary subsidies for corn farmers in Mozambique found that adoption of Green Revolution technology led to increased yields in both the short- and long-term.

=== Consultative Group on International Agricultural Research ===
In 1970, the year that Borlaug won the Nobel Peace Prize, foundation officials proposed a worldwide network of agricultural research centers under a permanent secretariat. This was further supported and developed by the World Bank; on 19 May 1971, the Consultative Group on International Agricultural Research (CGIAR) was established, co-sponsored by the FAO, IFAD, and UNDP. CGIAR has added many research centers throughout the world.

CGIAR has responded, at least in part, to criticisms of Green Revolution methodologies. This began in the 1980s, and mainly was a result of pressure from donor organizations. Methods like agroecosystem analysis and farming system research have been adopted to gain a more holistic view of agriculture.

== Agricultural production and food security ==
According to a 2012 review in Proceedings of the National Academy of Sciences of the existing academic literature, the Green Revolution "contributed to widespread poverty reduction, averted hunger for millions of people, and avoided the conversion of thousands of hectares of land into agricultural cultivation."

=== Technological developments ===
The Green Revolution spread technologies that already existed but had not been widely implemented outside industrialized nations. Two kinds of technologies were used in the Green Revolution, on the issues of cultivation and breeding. The technologies in cultivation are targeted at providing excellent growing conditions, which include modern irrigation projects, pesticides, and synthetic nitrogen fertilizer. The breeding technologies aimed at improving crop varieties developed through science-based methods including hybrids, combining modern genetics with plant-breeding trait selections.

==== High-yielding varieties ====
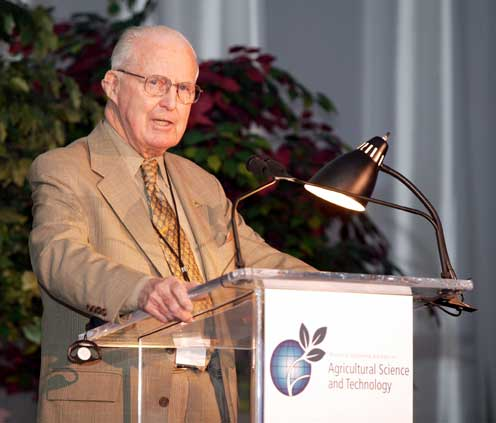
Norman Borlaug is called the "Father of the Green Revolution" for his work developing high-yield, disease-resistant wheat varieties that significantly increased global food production and helped avert widespread famine.

The novel technological development of the Green Revolution was the production of novel wheat cultivars. Agronomists bred high-yielding varieties of corn, wheat, and rice. HYVs have higher nitrogen-absorbing potential than other varieties. Since cereals that absorbed extra nitrogen would typically lodge, or fall over before harvest, semi-dwarfing genes were bred into their genomes. A Japanese dwarf wheat cultivar Norin 10 developed by Japanese agronomist Gonjiro Inazuka, which was sent to Orville Vogel at Washington State University by Cecil Salmon, was instrumental in developing Green Revolution wheat cultivars. In the 1960s, with a food crisis in Asia, the spread of high-yielding variety rice greatly increased.

Dr. Norman Borlaug, the "Father of the Green Revolution", bred rust-resistant cultivars which have strong and firm stems, preventing them from falling over under extreme weather at high levels of fertilization. CIMMYT (Centro Internacional de Mejoramiento de Maiz y Trigo – International Center for Maize and Wheat Improvements) conducted these breeding programs and helped spread high-yielding varieties in Mexico and countries in Asia like India and Pakistan. These programs led to the doubling of harvests in these countries.

Plant scientists figured out several parameters related to the high yield and identified the related genes which control the plant height and tiller number. With advances in molecular genetics, the mutant genes responsible for Arabidopsis thaliana genes (GA 20-oxidase, ga1, ga1-3), wheat reduced-height genes (Rht) and a rice semidwarf gene (sd1) were cloned. These were identified as gibberellin biosynthesis genes or cellular signaling component genes. Stem growth in the mutant background is significantly reduced leading to the dwarf phenotype. Photosynthetic investment in the stem is reduced dramatically as the shorter plants are inherently more stable mechanically. Assimilates become redirected to grain production, amplifying in particular the effect of chemical fertilizers on commercial yield.

High-yielding varieties significantly outperform traditional varieties in the presence of adequate irrigation, pesticides, and fertilizers. In the absence of these inputs, traditional varieties may outperform high-yielding varieties. Therefore, several authors have challenged the apparent superiority of high-yielding varieties not only compared to the traditional varieties alone, but by contrasting the monocultural system associated with high-yielding varieties with the polycultural system associated with traditional ones.

=== Production increases ===
Wheat yields in least developed countries since 1961, in kilograms per hectare.

By one 2021 estimate, the Green Revolution increased yields by 44% between 1965 and 2010. Cereal production more than doubled in developing nations between the years 1961–1985. Yields of rice, corn, and wheat increased steadily during that period. The production increases can be attributed equal to irrigation, fertilizer, and seed development, at least in the case of Asian rice.

While agricultural output increased as a result of the Green Revolution, the energy input to produce a crop has increased faster, so that the ratio of crops produced to energy input has decreased over time. Green Revolution techniques also heavily rely on agricultural machinery and chemical fertilizers, pesticides, herbicides, and defoliants; which, as of 2014, are derived from crude oil, making agriculture increasingly reliant on crude oil extraction.

World population 1950–2010

=== Effects on food security ===
The energy for the Green Revolution was provided by fossil fuels in the form of fertilizers (natural gas), pesticides (oil), and hydrocarbon fueled irrigation. The development of synthetic nitrogen fertilizer has significantly supported global population growth — it has been estimated that almost half the people on the Earth are currently fed as a result of synthetic nitrogen fertilizer use. According to ICIS Fertilizers managing editor Julia Meehan, "People don't realise that 50% of the world's food relies on fertilisers."

The world population has grown by about five billion since the beginning of the Green Revolution. India saw annual wheat production rise from 10 million tons in the 1960s to 73 million in 2006. The average person in the developing world consumes roughly 25% more calories per day now than before the Green Revolution. Between 1950 and 1984, as the Green Revolution transformed agriculture around the globe, world grain production increased by 160%.

The production increases fostered by the Green Revolution are often credited with having helped to avoid widespread famine, and for feeding billions of people.

=== Food security ===
World population supported with and without synthetic nitrogen fertilizers.

==== Malthusian criticism ====
Some criticisms generally involve some variation of the Malthusian principle of population. Such concerns often revolve around the idea that the Green Revolution is unsustainable, and argue that humanity is now in a state of overpopulation or overshoot with regards to the sustainable carrying capacity and ecological demands on the Earth. A 2021 study found, contrary to the expectations of the Malthusian hypothesis, that the Green Revolution led to reduced population growth, rather than an increase in population growth.

Although many people die each year as a direct or indirect result of hunger and poor nutrition, Malthus's more extreme predictions have failed to materialize. In 1798 Thomas Malthus made his prediction of impending famine. The world's population had doubled by 1923 and doubled again by 1973 without fulfilling Malthus's prediction. Malthusian Paul R. Ehrlich, in his 1968 book The Population Bomb, said that "India couldn't possibly feed two hundred million more people by 1980" and "Hundreds of millions of people will starve to death in spite of any crash programs." Ehrlich's warnings failed to materialize when India became self-sustaining in cereal production in 1974 (six years later) as a result of the introduction of Norman Borlaug's dwarf wheat varieties.

However, Borlaug was well aware of the implications of population growth. In his Nobel lecture he repeatedly presented improvements in food production within a sober understanding of the context of population. "The green revolution has won a temporary success in man's war against hunger and deprivation; it has given man a breathing space. If fully implemented, the revolution can provide sufficient food for sustenance during the next three decades. But the frightening power of human reproduction must also be curbed; otherwise the success of the green revolution will be ephemeral only. Most people still fail to comprehend the magnitude and menace of the "Population Monster"...Since man is potentially a rational being, however, I am confident that within the next two decades he will recognize the self-destructive course he steers along the road of irresponsible population growth..."

M. King Hubbert's prediction of world petroleum production rates (1968 peak of USA, 2005 World conventional oil peak, 2018 all liquides including corn to oil peak). Modern agriculture is largely reliant on petroleum energy.

==== Famine ====
To some modern Western sociologists and writers, increasing food production is not synonymous with increasing food security, and is only part of a larger equation. For example, Harvard professor Amartya Sen wrote that large historic famines were not caused by decreases in food supply, but by socioeconomic dynamics and a failure of public action. Economist Peter Bowbrick disputes Sen's theory, arguing that Sen relies on inconsistent arguments and contradicts available information, including sources that Sen himself cited. Bowbrick further argues that Sen's views coincide with that of the Bengal government at the time of the Bengal famine of 1943, and the policies Sen advocates failed to relieve the famine.

==== Quality of diet ====
Some have challenged the value of the increased food production of Green Revolution agriculture. These monoculture crops are often used for export, feed for animals, or conversion into biofuel. According to Emile Frison of Bioversity International, the Green Revolution has also led to a change in dietary habits, as fewer people are affected by hunger and die from starvation, but many are affected by malnutrition such as iron or vitamin-A deficiencies. Frison further asserts that almost 60% of yearly deaths of children under age five in developing countries are related to malnutrition.

The strategies developed by the Green Revolution focused on fending off starvation and were very successful in raising overall yields of cereal grains, but did not give sufficient relevance to nutritional quality. High yield cereal crops have low quality proteins, with essential amino acid deficiencies, are high in carbohydrates, and lack balanced essential fatty acids, vitamins, minerals and other quality factors.

High-yield rice, introduced since 1964 to poverty-ridden Asian countries, such as the Philippines, was found to have inferior flavor and be more glutinous and less savory than their native varieties, causing its price to be lower than the average market value.

In the Philippines the heavy use of pesticides in rice production, in the early part of the Green Revolution, poisoned and killed off fish and weedy green vegetables that traditionally coexisted in rice paddies. These were nutritious food sources for many poor Filipino farmers prior to the introduction of pesticides, further impacting the diets of locals.

=== Socioeconomic impacts ===
According to a 2021 study, the Green Revolution substantially increased income. A delay in the Green Revolution by ten years would have cost 17% of GDP per capita, whereas if the Green Revolution had never happened, it could have reduced GDP per capita in the developing world by half.

=== Environmental impact ===
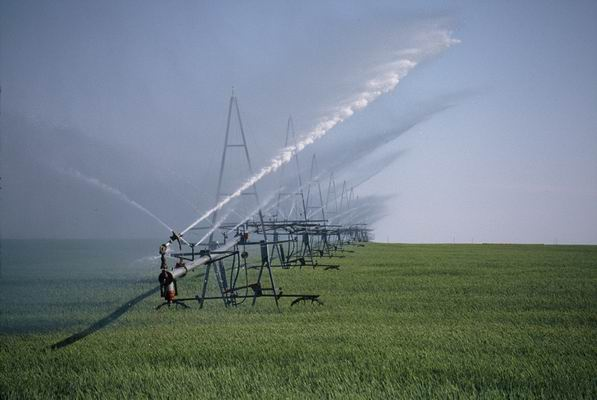
Increased use of irrigation played a major role in the green revolution.

==== Biodiversity ====
There are varying opinions about the effect of the Green Revolution on wild biodiversity. One hypothesis speculates that by increasing production per unit of land area, agriculture will not need to expand into new, uncultivated areas to feed a growing human population. However, land degradation and soil nutrients depletion have forced farmers to clear forested areas in order to maintain production. A counter-hypothesis speculates that biodiversity was sacrificed because traditional systems of agriculture that were displaced sometimes incorporated practices to preserve wild biodiversity, and because the Green Revolution expanded agricultural development into new areas where it was once unprofitable or too arid. For example, the development of wheat varieties tolerant to acid soil conditions with high aluminium content permitted the introduction of agriculture in the Cerrado semi-humid tropical savanna.

The world community has clearly acknowledged the negative aspects of agricultural expansion as the 1992 Rio Treaty, signed by 189 nations, has generated numerous national Biodiversity Action Plans which assign significant biodiversity loss to agriculture's expansion into new domains.

The Green Revolution has been criticized for an agricultural model which relied on a few staple and market profitable crops, and pursuing a model which limited the biodiversity of Mexico. One of the critics against these techniques and the Green Revolution as a whole was Carl O. Sauer, a geography professor at the University of California, Berkeley. According to Sauer these techniques of plant breeding would result in negative effects on the country's resources, and the culture:

A good aggressive bunch of American agronomists and plant breeders could ruin the native resources for good and all by pushing their American commercial stocks... And Mexican agriculture cannot be pointed toward standardization on a few commercial types without upsetting native economy and culture hopelessly... Unless the Americans understand that, they'd better keep out of this country entirely. That must be approached from an appreciation of native economies as being basically sound.

==== Greenhouse gas emissions ====
Studies indicate that the Green Revolution has substantially increased emissions of the greenhouse gas CO_{2}. High yield agriculture has dramatic effects on the amount of carbon cycling in the atmosphere. The way in which farms are grown, in tandem with the seasonal carbon cycling of various crops, could alter the impact carbon in the atmosphere has on global warming. Wheat, rice, and soybean crops account for a significant amount of the increase in carbon in the atmosphere over the last 50 years.

Poorly regulated applications of nitrogen fertilizer that exceed the amount used by plants, such as broadcast applications of urea, result in emissions of nitrous oxide, a potent greenhouse gas, and in water pollution. As the UN Special Rapporteur on the Right to Food, Michael Fakhri summarized in 2022, "food systems emit approximately one third of the world’s greenhouse gases and contribute to the alarming decline in the number of animal and plant species. Intensive industrial agriculture and export-oriented food policies have driven much of this damage. Ever since governments started adopting the Green Revolution in the 1950s, the world's food systems have been increasingly designed along industrial models, the idea being that, if people are able to purchase industrial inputs, then they can produce a large amount of food. Productivity was not measured in terms of human and environmental health, but exclusively in terms of commodity output and economic growth. This same system disrupted carbon, nitrogen and phosphorus cycles because it requires farmers to depend on fossil fuel- based machines and chemical inputs, displacing long-standing regenerative and integrated farming practices." The IPCC's synthesis of recent findings states similarly "intensive agriculture during the second half of the 20th century led to soil degradation and loss of natural resources and contributed to climate change." They further specify, "while the Green Revolution technologies substantially increased the yield of few crops and allowed countries to reduce hunger, they also resulted in inappropriate and excessive use of agrochemicals, inefficient water use, loss of beneficial biodiversity, water and soil pollution and significantly reduced crop and varietal diversity."

==== Land use ====
Global land spared as a result of cereal yield improvements

A 2021 study found that the Green Revolution led to a reduction in land used for agriculture.

=== Health impact ===
Studies have found that the Green Revolution substantially reduced infant mortality in the developing world. A 2020 study of 37 developing countries found that the diffusion of modern crop varieties "reduced infant mortality by 2.4–5.3 percentage points (from a baseline of 18%), with stronger effects for male infants and among poor households." Another 2020 study found that high yield crop varieties reduced infant mortality in India, with particularly large effects for rural children, boys and low-caste children.

Consumption of pesticides and fertilizer agrochemicals associated with the Green Revolution may have adverse health impacts. For example, pesticides may increase the likelihood of cancer. Poor farming practices including non-compliance to usage of masks and over-usage of the chemicals compound this situation. In 1989, WHO and UNEP estimated that there were around 1 million human pesticide poisonings annually. Some 20,000 (mostly in developing countries) ended in death, as a result of poor labeling, loose safety standards etc. A 2014 study found that Indian children who were exposed to higher quantities of fertilizer agrochemicals experienced more adverse health impacts.

== Second Green Revolution ==
Although the Green Revolution has been able to improve agricultural output briefly in some regions in the world, its yield rates have been declining, while its social and environmental costs become more clearly apparent. As a result, many organizations continue to invent new ways to rectify, significantly augment or replace the techniques already used in the Green Revolution. Frequently quoted inventions are the System of Rice Intensification, marker-assisted selection, agroecology, and applying existing technologies to agricultural problems of the developing world. It is projected that global populations by 2050 will increase by one-third and as such will require a 70% increase in the production of food, which can be achieved with the right policies and investments.

=== Evergreen Revolution ===
The term 'Evergreen Revolution' (Note: Not to be confused with evergreen agriculture, that can be explained as growing trees with agricultural crops.) was coined by Indian agricultural scientist M. S. Swaminathan in 1990, though he has stated that the concept dates back to as early as 1968. It aims to represent an added dimension to the original concepts and practices of the green revolution, the ecological dimension. Swaminathan has described it as "productivity in perpetuity without associated ecological harm". The concept has evolved into a combination of science, economics, and sociology. In 2002, American biologist E.O. Wilson observed that: [emphasis added]

The problem before us is how to feed billions of new mouths over the next several decades and save the rest of life at the same time, without being trapped in a Faustian bargain that threatens freedom and security. No one knows the exact solution to this dilemma. The benefit must come from an Evergreen Revolution. The aim of this new thrust is to lift food production well above the level obtained by the Green Revolution of the 1960s, using technology and regulatory policy more advanced and even safer than those now in existence.

— E.O. Wilson

However, despite Swaminathan's prominent role in India's adoption of Green Revolution agriculture, the 'Evergreen' concept largely reflects the failures of the original project. Although a relatively lesser known term, its substance largely reflects the consensus positions outlined in recent IPCC and other synthetic reports.

== See also ==
- White Revolution (India)
- Arab Agricultural Revolution
- British Agricultural Revolution
- Columbian exchange
- Environmental impact of agriculture
- Food sovereignty
- Genetic pollution
- Neolithic Revolution
- Small-scale agriculture
- Caloric density
- Virgin Lands campaign
- Water scarcity
