= Aaqua =

Indian farmer knowledge exchange

aAQUA
- Available in: English, Marathi, Hindi, Telugu, Kannada
- Owner: Agrocom Software Technologies Pvt. Ltd.
- Website: https://aaqua.persistent.co.in/aaqua/forum/index
- Commercial: Yes
- Launched: October 2003
- Content license: http://aaqua.persistent.co.in/aaqua/forum/viewthread?thread=14509

Almost All Questions Answered or aAQUA is an Indian farmer knowledge exchange available at aaqua.org answering questions from farmers in four languages in any one of 420 districts in India and some places abroad.

== Open to all ==
Any farmer, agriculturist or hobbyist can register and post questions and a panel of experts answers questions based on the problem description and photos if any. Contextual Information such as geographical location, weather, and season are retrieved automatically and made available to experts. Apart from agriculture, aAQUA is a forum for questions regarding education, healthcare and other issues important to a developing population. Currently questions may be asked in one of four languages - Hindi, Marathi, Kannada and English.

== Background ==
Originally developed at the Developmental Informatics Lab, aAQUA uses relational database management systems and information retrieval techniques with query optimization, intermittent synchronization and multilingual support. An excellent technical introduction is available in the Internet Computing Article. A chapter on aAQUA was published in a book by the Food and Agriculture Organization as a Case Study in the Asia Pacific Region.

== Awards ==
1. Manthan Award by Digital Empowerment Foundation (handed by Prof Anil Gupta of IIM Ahmedabad, Sivakumar of ITC e-Choupal and Sachin Pilot, MP.
2. Indian Startups and Business Incubators Award (handed by Chief Minister of Maharashtra Prithviraj Chavan)

== Technology transfer ==
In 2014–15, the software was licensed perpetually to Tata Consultancy Services in a private agreement between Agrocom founders Anil Bahuman, Prof Ramamritham and TCS Chief Technology Officer Ananth Krishnan. aAQUA Software was used to power the databases of TCS's mKrishi project including multi-lingual keyword search across Indian language documents using Natural Language Processing methods.
