= High-yielding variety =

Crops with high yield in agriculture

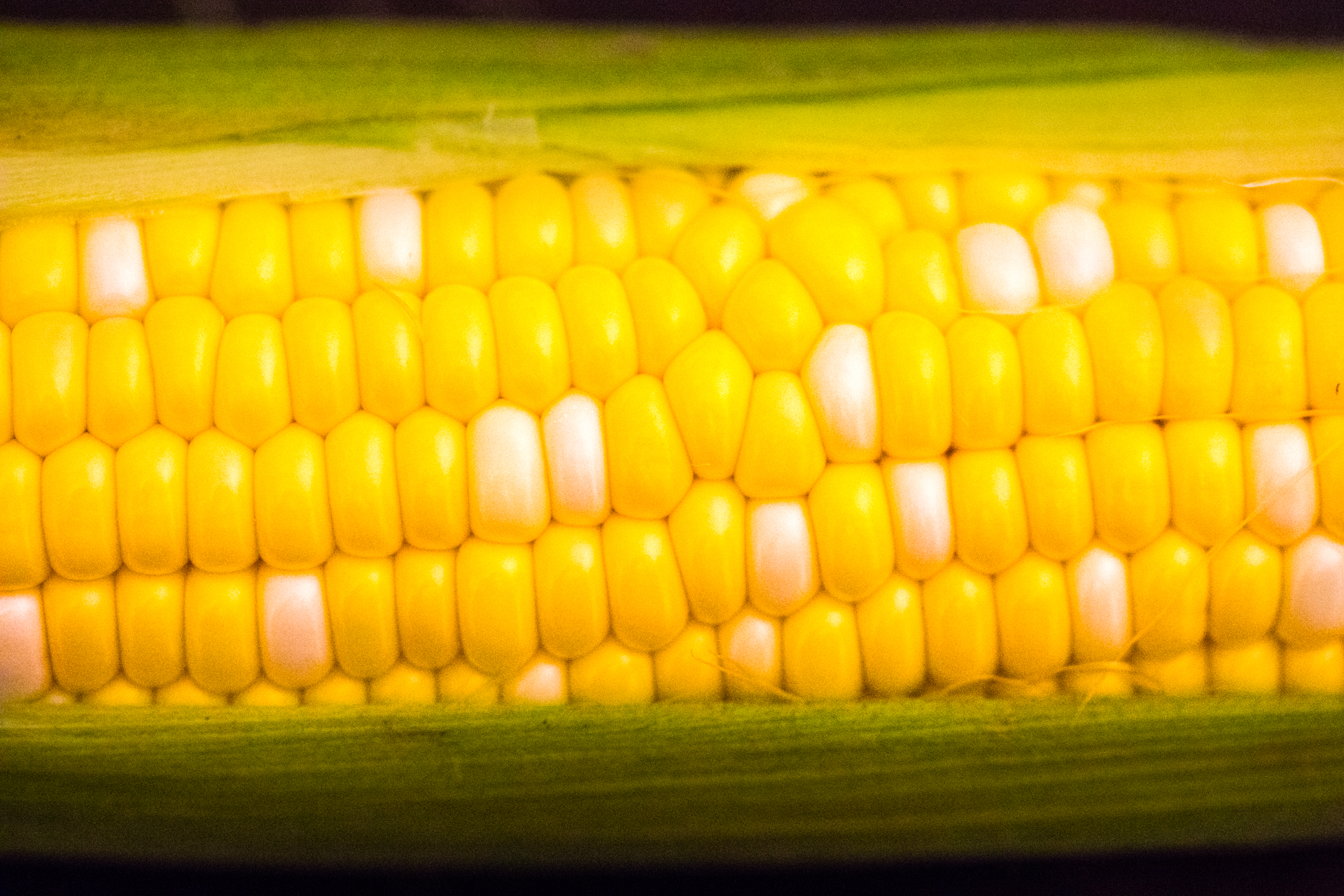
Corn, one crop for which HYV seeds have been created.

High-yielding varieties (abbreviated as HYVs) of agricultural crops are varieties of crops that are usually characterized by a combination of the following traits in contrast to the conventional ones:

- Higher crop yield per unit area
- Higher quality of crops
- Improved response to fertilizers
- Early maturation
- Resistance to droughts and floods
- High reliance on irrigation and fertilizers (see intensive farming)
- Dwarfness (smaller size)
- Resistance to many diseases and insects.

The most popular HYVs can be found among wheat, corn, soybean, rice, potato, and cotton. They are heavily used in commercial and plantation farms.

The Green Revolution in the late 1960s (or generally, in the second half of the 20th century) introduced farmers to cultivation of food crops using HYV seeds, although their ancestral roots may be older.

Compared to the traditional seeds, HYV seeds promise to produce much greater amounts of grain on a single plant. As a result, the same piece of land now produces much larger quantities of foodgrains than was possible earlier. However, HYVs need plenty of water, chemical fertilizers and pesticides to produce the best results.

== Development ==
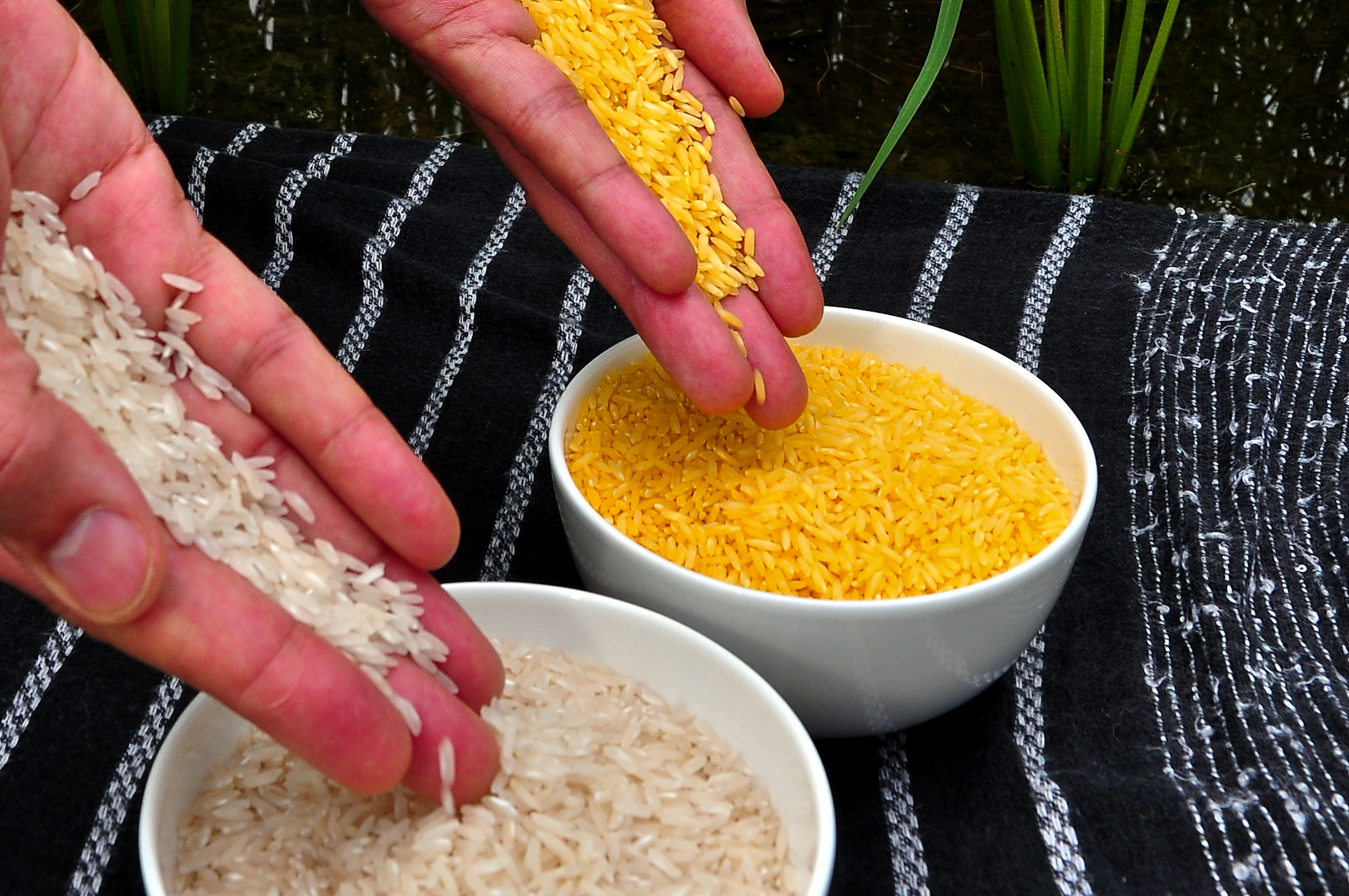
Golden rice is formed by plant crossbreeding.

HYV seeds were developed by scientists to improve food supplies and reduce famine in developing countries.

HYVs are developed in the field of biotechnology, by genetic crossbreeding of plants.

== Advantages ==
High yielding variety seeds are known for their resistance to insects and diseases and ability to produce high yields. These seeds are superior in quality and promote abundant and healthy crop production. The high-yielding seeds exhibit resilience against floods and droughts, resulting in better-quality yields. They also mature earlier than the traditional seeds.

== Disadvantages ==
HYV crops need a lot of inputs (such as fertilizers and pesticides) to grow, and this increases costs as well as environmental pollution.

HYV seeds are very expensive. The poorest farmers have been unable to buy HYV seeds, so they are of no benefit to them.

== See also ==
- Green Revolution
- Famine of Bengal
- Agriculture in India
