= Orville Vogel =

American biologist and wheat breeder

Orville Vogel (1907–1991) was an American scientist and wheat breeder whose research enabled the "Green Revolution" in world food production.

== Life and career ==
Orville Alvin Vogel, one of William and Emelia Vogel's four children, was born in Pilger, Stanton County, Nebraska. He graduated from high school in 1925 and from the University of Nebraska with bachelor's and master's degrees in 1929 and 1931, respectively. He married Bertha Berkman in 1931 and began his career as a wheat breeder at Washington State College (now University) in Pullman in 1931. Vogel worked for the U.S. Department of Agriculture's Agriculture Research Service at Washington State University for his whole career, from 1931 to 1972. In retirement, Vogel established a fund to help finance wheat research. He and his wife, Bertha, matched donations to help launch the fund. Vogel died of cancer in 1991.

== Role in the Green Revolution ==
Cecil Salmon, a biologist working in post-World War II Japan, collected 16 varieties of wheat, including Norin 10, which was developed by an agronomist Gonjiro Inazuka in Iwate Prefecture to be very short, thus less likely to suffer wind damage. Salmon sent them to Vogel in Washington in 1949. Vogel began crossing Norin 10 with other wheats to make new short-strawed varieties. Vogel led the team that developed Gaines, the first of several new varieties that produced 25 percent higher yields than the varieties they replaced. Vogel shared his seeds of Norin 10 and Norin 10/Brevor 14 cross with Norman Borlaug, who later received the 1970 Nobel Peace Prize for his role in the “green revolution.” Borlaug publicly acknowledged Vogel's contributions to his research.

== Honors and awards ==
Among many honors, Dr. Vogel received the 1975 National Medal of Science, Washington State's first Medal of Merit in 1987 and the 1990 John Scott Award given by the City of Philadelphia for useful inventions. He was inducted into the Agricultural Research Service's Science Hall of Fame in 1987. Washington State University honored Vogel by naming a chair and a building after him: the Orville A. Vogel Endowed Chair in Wheat Breeding and Genetics, that is currently co-occupied by winter wheat breeder Arron Carter and spring wheat breeder Michael Pumphrey, and the Orville A. Vogel Plant BioSciences Building.
