= Norin 10 wheat =

Wheat cultivar

Norin 10 wheat (小麦農林10号) is a semi-dwarf wheat cultivar with very large ears that was bred by Gonjiro Inazuka at an experimental station in Iwate Prefecture, Japan. Its parents were a semi-dwarf Japanese landrace , and two varieties from the USA. In 1935 it was registered as a numbered cultivar by the Japanese Ministry of Agriculture and Forestry Nōrinshō (農林省).

Norin 10 grew to just two feet (60 - 100 cm) tall, instead of the usual four (150 cm). It provided two genes, Rht1 and Rht2, that resulted in reduced-height wheats, thus allowing better nutrient uptake and tillage, since when heavily fertilised with nitrogen, tall varieties grow too high, become top-heavy, and lodge.

The Rht1 and Rht2 genes have been used in wheat breeding programmes worldwide to provide shorter plants with higher yields. Cecil Salmon, a biologist and wheat expert on General Douglas MacArthur's team in Japan after 1945, collected 16 varieties of wheat including Norin 10. He sent these seeds to Orville Vogel at Washington State University and they were used within USA breeding programmes in the 1950s. Norin 10 was also provided to the International Maize and Wheat Improvement Center in Mexico. It was used here by Norman Borlaug and collaborators in crosses with local varieties to produce dwarf varieties that were also daylight-insensitive and had resistance to rust disease. These were subsequently distributed worldwide. These included high-output varieties tested in India (Lerma Rojo 64 and Sonora 64) during the Green Revolution.

Norin 10 helped developing countries, such as India and Pakistan, to increase the productivity of their crops by approximately 60% during the Green Revolution.

== See also ==
- Biodiversity
- Monkombu Sambasivan Swaminathan
