= Mahatma Gandhi =

Indian independence activist (1869–1948)

Mahātmā Gandhi
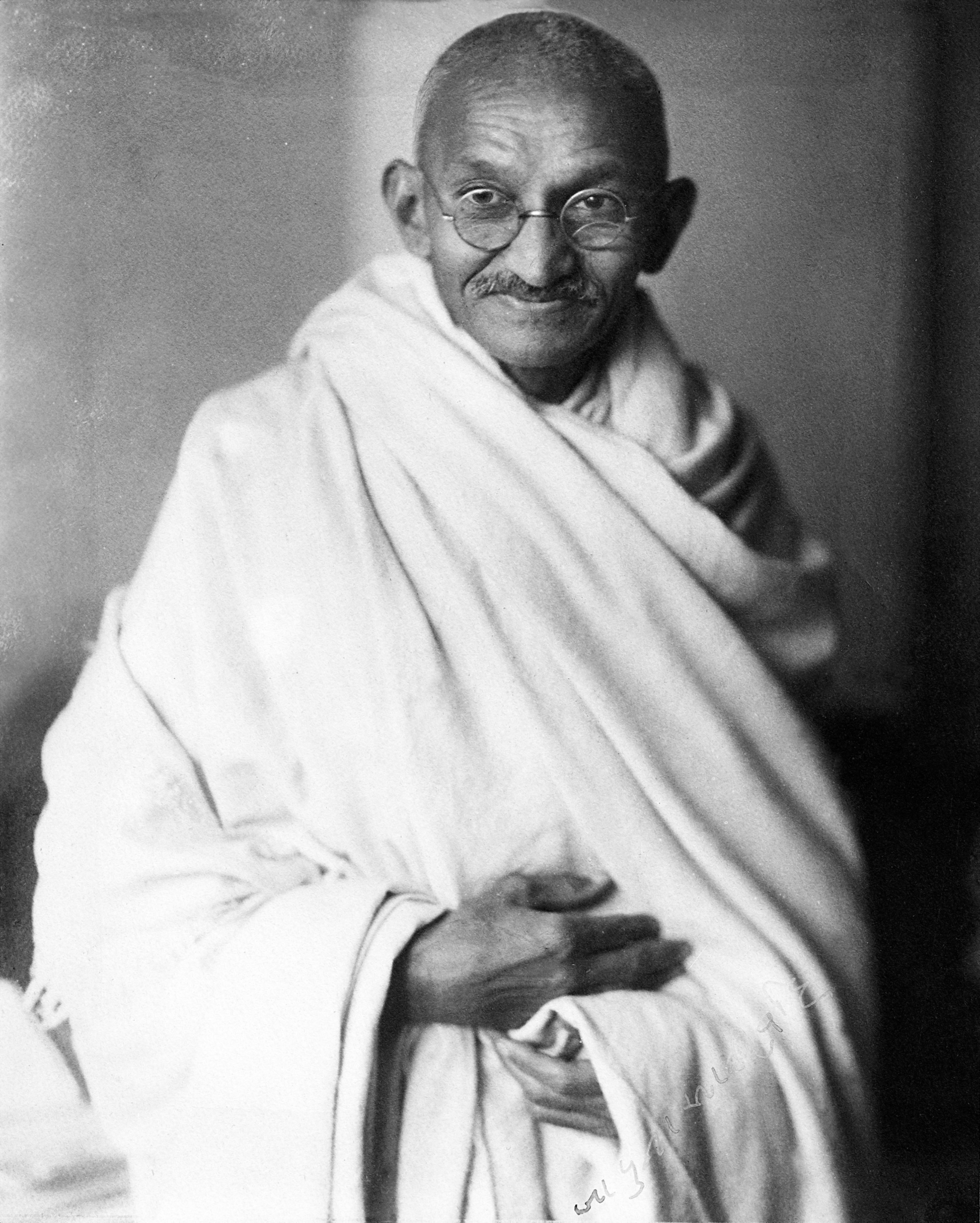
- Gandhi in 1931
- Born: Mohandas Karamchand Gandhi; 2 October 1869; Porbandar, Kathiawar Agency, British Raj
- Died: 30 January 1948 (aged 78); New Delhi, India
- Cause of death: Assassination by gunshot
- Monuments: Raj Ghat, Delhi; Gandhi Smriti, New Delhi
- Other names: Bāpū (father), Rāṣṭrapitā (the Father of the Nation)
- Education: Samaldas Arts College (Note: Did not graduate); University College London (Note: Informal auditing student between 1888 and 1891); Inns of Court School of Law
- Occupations: Lawyer; activist; politician
- Years active: 1893–1948
- Known for: Leadership of the campaign for India's independence from British rule; Nonviolent resistance
- Political party: Indian National Congress (1920–1934)
- Spouse: Kasturba Gandhi (m. 1883; died 1944)
- Children: Harilal; Manilal; Ramdas; Devdas
- Parents: Karamchand Gandhi; Putlibai Gandhi
- Relatives: Gandhi family

43rd President of the Indian National Congress
- In office December 1924 – April 1925
- Preceded by: Maulana Azad
- Succeeded by: Sarojini Naidu
- Gandhi's voice Gandhi's spiritual message to the world Recorded 17 October 1931

Mohandas Karamchand Gandhi (Note: Pronounced variously /ˈɡɑːndi, ˈɡændi/ GA(H)N-dee; Gujarati pronunciation: [ˈmoɦəndɑs ˈkəɾəmtʃənd ˈɡɑndʱi]) (2 October 1869 – 30 January 1948) was an Indian lawyer, anti-colonial nationalist, and political ethicist who employed nonviolent resistance to lead the successful campaign for India's independence from British rule, and whose legacy would later inspire movements for civil rights and freedom across the world. The honorific Mahātmā (Sanskrit: "great-souled", "venerable"), first applied to him in 1914 in South Africa, is now used throughout the world.

Born and raised in a Hindu family in coastal Gujarat, Gandhi was trained in the law at the Inner Temple in London and was called to the bar at the age of 22. After two uncertain years in India, where he was unable to start a successful law practice, Gandhi moved to South Africa in 1893 to represent an Indian merchant in a lawsuit. He went on to live in South Africa for the next 21 years. Here, Gandhi raised a family and first employed nonviolent resistance in a campaign for civil rights. In 1915, aged 45, he returned to India and soon set about organising peasants, farmers, and urban labourers to protest against discrimination and excessive land tax.

Assuming leadership of the Indian National Congress in 1921, Gandhi led nationwide campaigns for easing poverty, expanding women's rights, building religious and ethnic amity, ending untouchability, and, above all, achieving swaraj or self-rule. Gandhi adopted the short dhoti woven with hand-spun yarn as a mark of identification with India's rural poor. He began to live in a self-sufficient residential community, to eat simple food, and undertake long fasts as a means of both introspection and political protest. Bringing anti-colonial nationalism to the common Indians, Gandhi led them in challenging the British-imposed salt tax with the 400 km (250 mi) Dandi Salt March in 1930 and in calling for the British to quit India in 1942. He was imprisoned many times and for many years in both South Africa and India.

Gandhi's vision of an independent India based on religious pluralism was challenged in the early 1940s by a Muslim nationalism which demanded a separate homeland for Muslims within British India. In August 1947, Britain granted independence, but the British Indian Empire was partitioned into two dominions, a Hindu-majority India and a Muslim-majority Pakistan. As many displaced Hindus, Muslims, and Sikhs made their way to their new lands, religious violence broke out, especially in Punjab and Bengal. Abstaining from the official celebration of independence, Gandhi visited the affected areas, attempting to alleviate distress. In the months following, he undertook several hunger strikes to stop the religious violence. The last of these was begun in Delhi on 12 January 1948, when Gandhi was 78. There developed a Hindu nationalist opposition to Gandhi's advocacy of nonviolence, as well as his friendship with Indian Muslims. Among these was Nathuram Godse, a militant Hindu nationalist from Pune, western India, who assassinated Gandhi by firing three bullets into his chest at an interfaith prayer meeting in Delhi on 30 January 1948.

Gandhi's birthday, 2 October, is commemorated in India as Gandhi Jayanti, a national holiday, and worldwide as the International Day of Nonviolence. Gandhi is considered to be the Father of the Nation in post-colonial India. During India's nationalist movement and in several decades immediately after, he was also commonly called Bapu, an endearment roughly meaning "father".

== Early life and background ==
=== Parents ===
Gandhi's father, Karamchand Uttamchand Gandhi (1822–1885), served as the dewan (chief minister) of Porbandar state. His family originated from the then village of Kutiana in what was then Junagadh State. Although Karamchand only had been a clerk in the state administration and had an elementary education, he proved a capable chief minister.

During his tenure, Karamchand married four times. His first two wives died young, after each had given birth to a daughter, and his third marriage was childless. In 1857, Karamchand sought his third wife's permission to remarry; that year, he married Putlibai (1844–1891), who also came from Junagadh, and was from a Pranami Vaishnava family. Karamchand and Putlibai had four children: a son, Laxmidas (c. 1860–1914), a daughter, Raliatbehn (1862–1960), a second son, Karsandas (c. 1866–1913), and a third son, Mohandas Karamchand Gandhi, who was born on 2 October 1869 in Porbandar (also known as Sudamapuri), a coastal town on the Kathiawar Peninsula and then part of the small princely state of Porbandar in the Kathiawar Agency of the British Raj.

In 1874, Gandhi's father, Karamchand, left Porbandar for the smaller state of Rajkot, where he became a counsellor to its ruler, the Thakur Sahib; though Rajkot was a less prestigious state than Porbandar, the British regional political agency was located there, which gave the state's diwan a measure of security. In 1876, Karamchand became diwan of Rajkot and was succeeded as diwan of Porbandar by his brother Tulsidas. Karamchand's family then rejoined him in Rajkot. They moved to their family home Kaba Gandhi No Delo in 1881.

=== Childhood ===
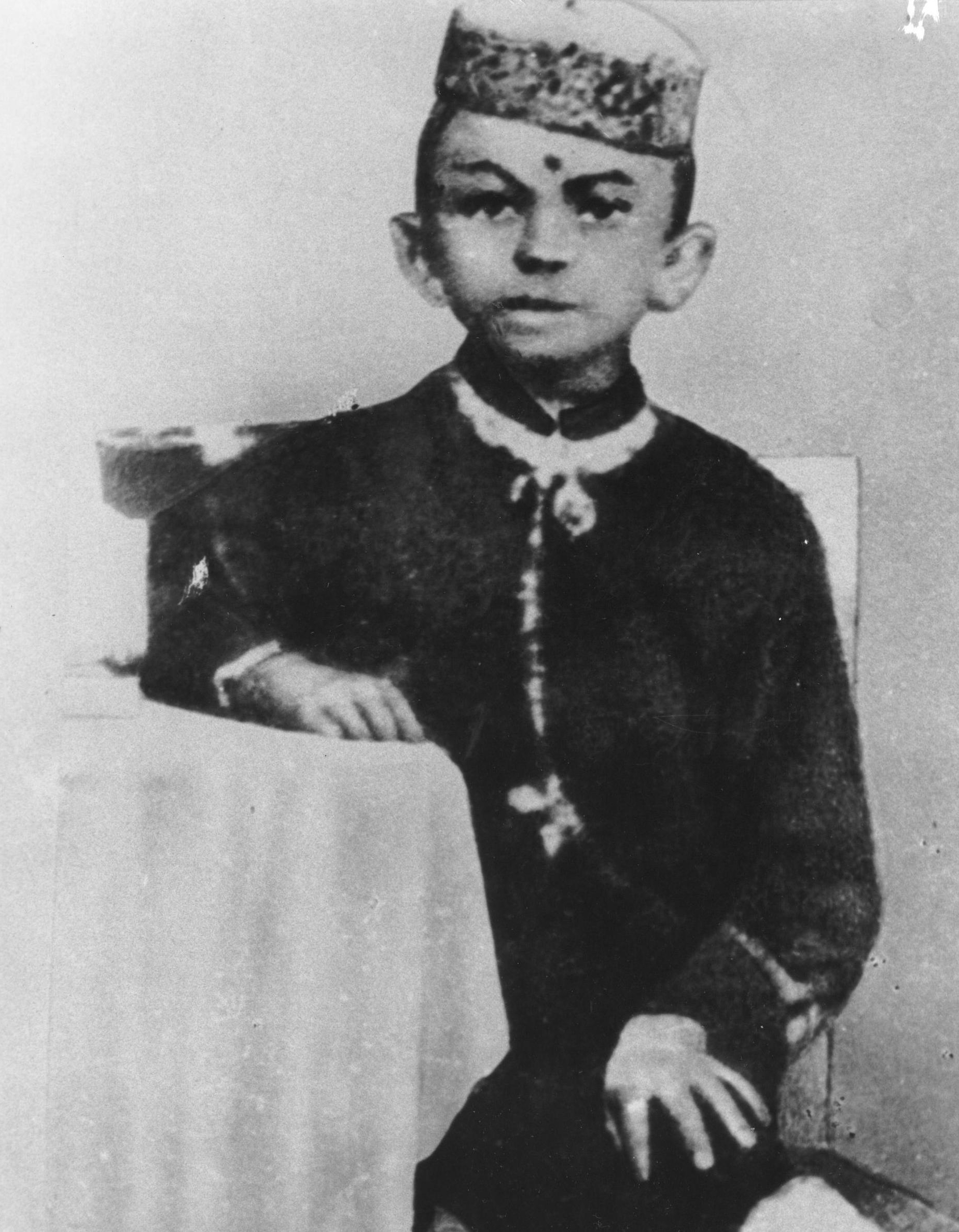
Gandhi in 1876 at the age of 7

As a child, Gandhi was described by his sister Raliat as "restless as mercury, either playing or roaming about. One of his favourite pastimes was twisting dogs' ears." The Indian classics, especially the stories of Shravana and king Harishchandra, had a great impact on Gandhi in his childhood. In his autobiography, Gandhi states that they left an indelible impression on his mind. Gandhi writes: "It haunted me and I must have acted Harishchandra to myself times without number." Gandhi's early self-identification with truth and love as supreme values is traceable to these epic characters.

The family's religious background was eclectic. Mohandas was born into a Gujarati Hindu Modh Bania family. Gandhi's father, Karamchand, was Hindu and his mother Putlibai was from a Pranami Vaishnava Hindu family. Gandhi's father was of Modh Baniya caste in the varna of Vaishya. His mother came from the medieval Krishna bhakti-based Pranami tradition, whose religious texts include the Bhagavad Gita, the Bhagavata Purana, and a collection of 14 texts with teachings that the tradition believes to include the essence of the Vedas, the Quran and the Bible. Gandhi was deeply influenced by his mother, an extremely pious lady who "would not think of taking her meals without her daily prayers... she would take the hardest vows and keep them without flinching. To keep two or three consecutive fasts was nothing to her."

At the age of nine, Gandhi entered the local school in Rajkot, near his home. There, he studied the rudiments of arithmetic, history, the Gujarati language and geography. At the age of 11, Gandhi joined the High School in Rajkot, Alfred High School. He was an average student, won some prizes, but was shy and tongue-tied, with no interest in games; Gandhi's only companions were books and school lessons.

=== Marriage ===
In May 1883, the 13-year-old Gandhi was married to 14-year-old Kasturbai Gokuldas Kapadia (her first name was usually shortened to "Kasturba", and affectionately to "Ba") in an arranged marriage, according to the custom of the region at that time. In the process, he lost a year at school but was later allowed to make up by accelerating his studies. Gandhi's wedding was a joint event, where his brother and cousin were also married. Recalling the day of their marriage, Gandhi once said, "As we didn't know much about marriage, for us it meant only wearing new clothes, eating sweets and playing with relatives." As was the prevailing tradition, the adolescent bride was to spend much time at her parents' house, and away from her husband.

Writing many years later, Gandhi described with regret the lustful feelings he felt for his young bride: "Even at school I used to think of her, and the thought of nightfall and our subsequent meeting was ever haunting me." Gandhi later recalled feeling jealous and possessive of her, such as when Kasturba would visit a temple with her girlfriends, and being sexually lustful in his feelings for her.

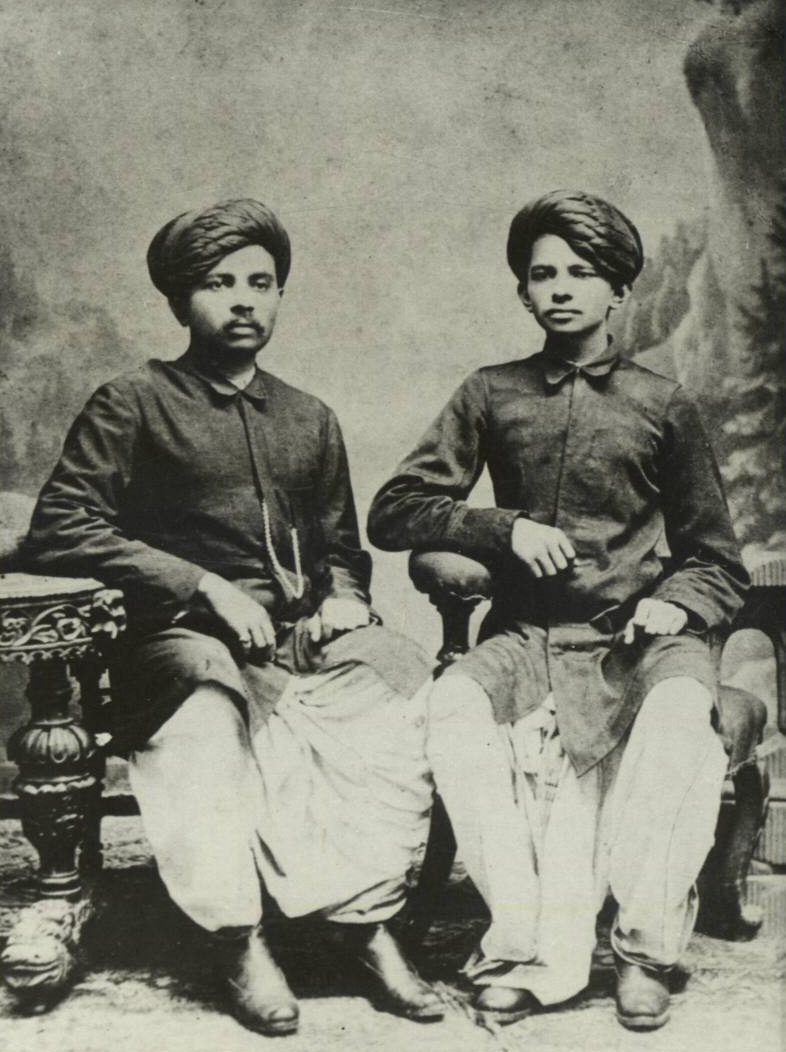
Gandhi (right) with his eldest brother Laxmidas in 1886

In late 1885, Gandhi's father, Karamchand, died. Gandhi had left his father's bedside to be with his wife mere minutes before his passing. Many decades later, Gandhi wrote "if animal passion had not blinded me, I should have been spared the torture of separation from my father during his last moments." Later, Gandhi, then 16 years old, and his wife, age 17, had their first child, who survived only a few days. The two deaths anguished Gandhi. The Gandhis had four more children, all sons: Harilal, born in 1888; Manilal, born in 1892; Ramdas, born in 1897; and Devdas, born in 1900.

In November 1887, the 18-year-old Gandhi graduated from high school in Ahmedabad. In January 1888, he enrolled at Samaldas College in Bhavnagar State, then the sole degree-granting institution of higher education in the region. However, Gandhi dropped out and returned to his family in Porbandar.

Outside school, Gandhi's education was enriched by exposure to Gujarati literature, especially reformers like Narmad and Govardhanram Tripathi, whose works alerted the Gujaratis to their own faults and weaknesses such as belief in religious dogmatism.

== Three years in London ==
=== Student of law ===
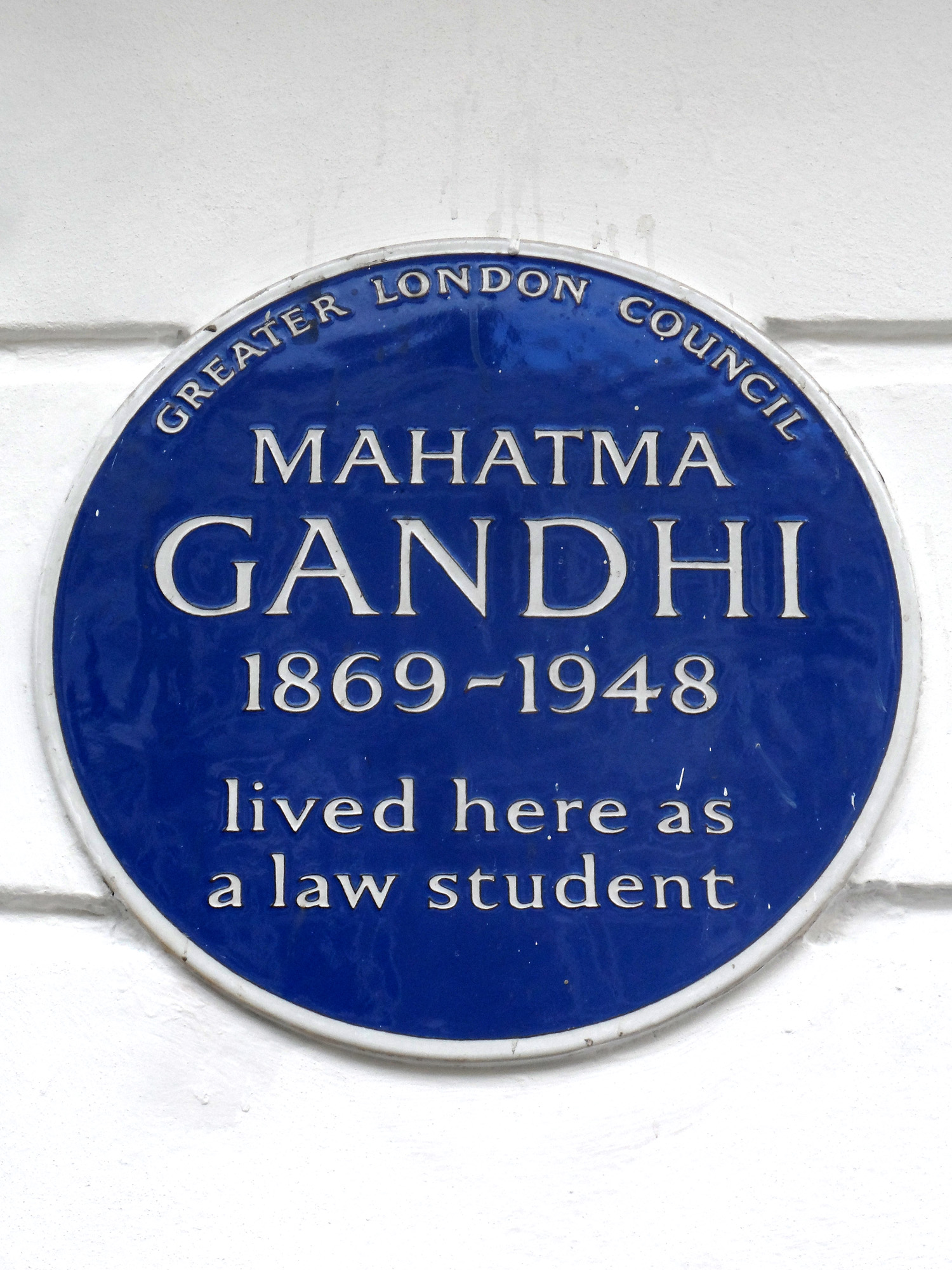
Commemorative plaque at 20 Baron's Court Road, Barons Court, London

Gandhi had dropped out of the cheapest college he could afford in Bombay. Mavji Dave Joshiji, a Brahmin priest and family friend, advised Gandhi and his family that he should consider law studies in London. In July 1888, Gandhi's wife Kasturba gave birth to their first surviving child, Harilal. Gandhi's mother was not comfortable about Gandhi leaving his wife and family and going so far from home. Gandhi's uncle Tulsidas also tried to dissuade his nephew, but Gandhi wanted to go. To persuade his wife and mother, Gandhi made a vow in front of his mother that he would abstain from meat, alcohol, and women. Gandhi's brother, Laxmidas, who was already a lawyer, cheered Gandhi's London studies plan and offered to support him. Putlibai gave Gandhi her permission and blessing.

On 10 August 1888, Gandhi, aged 18, left Porbandar for Mumbai, then known as Bombay. A local newspaper covering the farewell function by his old high school in Rajkot noted that Gandhi was the first Bania from Kathiawar to proceed to England for his Barrister Examination. As Mohandas Gandhi waited for a berth on a ship to London he found that he had attracted the ire of the Modh Banias of Bombay. Upon arrival in Bombay, he stayed with the local Modh Bania community whose elders warned Gandhi that England would tempt him to compromise his religion, and eat and drink in Western ways. Despite Gandhi informing them of his promise to his mother and her blessings, Gandhi was excommunicated from his caste. Gandhi ignored this, and on 4 September, he sailed from Bombay to London, with his brother seeing him off. Gandhi attended University College, London, where he took classes in English literature with Henry Morley in 1888–1889.

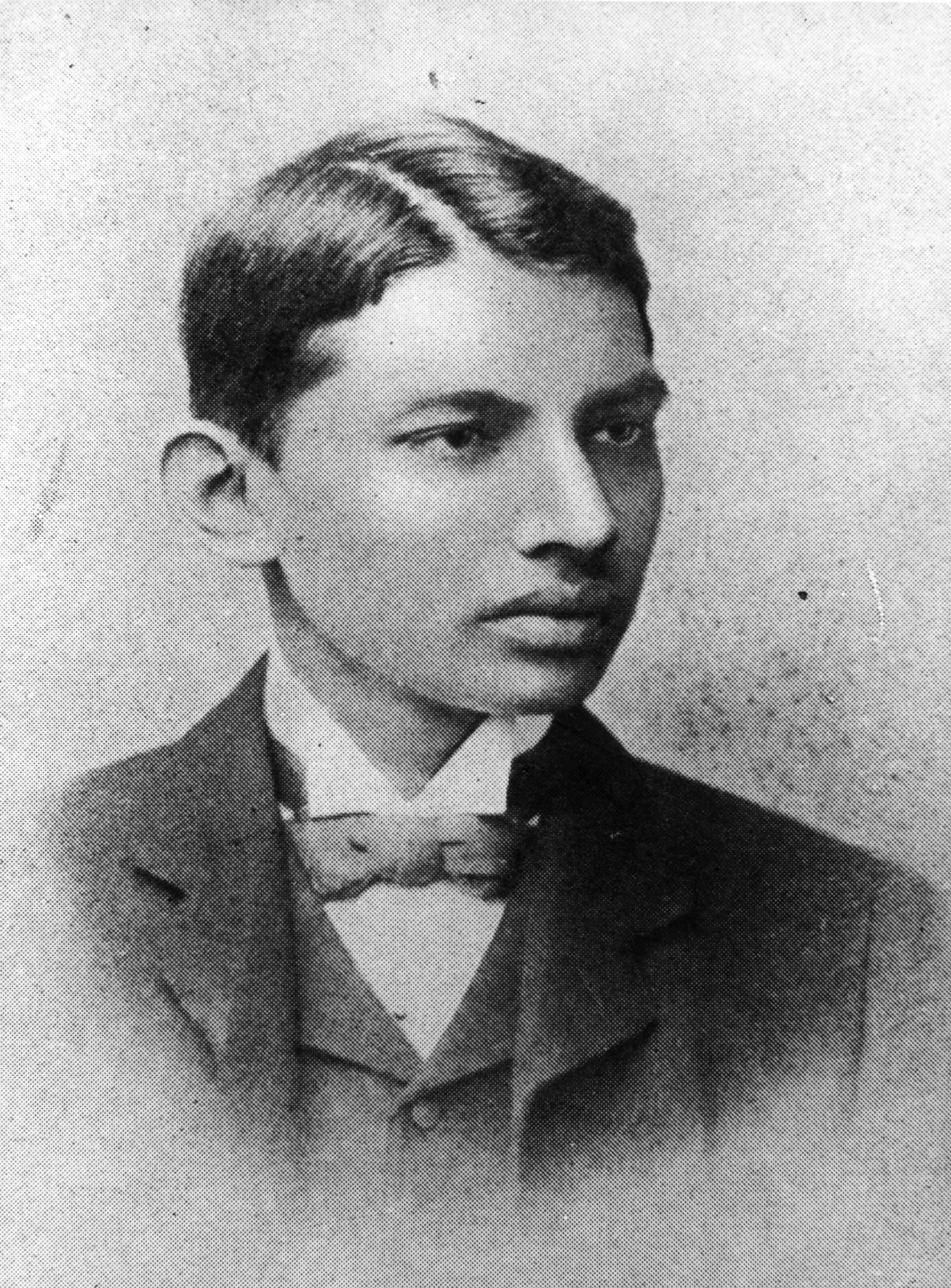
Gandhi in London as a law student

Gandhi also enrolled at the Inns of Court School of Law in Inner Temple with the intention of becoming a barrister. His childhood shyness and self-withdrawal had continued through his teens. Gandhi retained these traits when he arrived in London, but joined a public speaking practice group and overcame his shyness sufficiently to practise law.

Gandhi demonstrated a keen interest in the welfare of London's impoverished dockland communities. In 1889, a bitter trade dispute broke out in London, with dockers striking for better pay and conditions, and seamen, shipbuilders, factory girls and other joining the strike in solidarity. The strikers were successful, in part due to the mediation of Cardinal Manning, leading Gandhi and an Indian friend to make a point of visiting the cardinal and thanking him for his work.

=== Vegetarianism and committee work ===
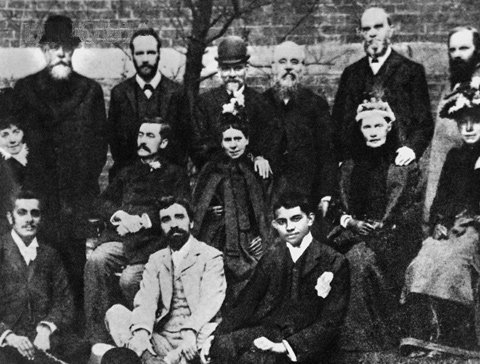
Gandhi with the Vegetarian Society on the Isle of Wight, 1890

His vow to his mother influenced Gandhi's time in London. Gandhi tried to adopt "English" customs, including taking dancing lessons. However, he didn't appreciate the bland vegetarian food offered by his landlady and was frequently hungry until he found one of London's few vegetarian restaurants. Influenced by Henry Salt's writing, Gandhi joined the London Vegetarian Society (LVS) and was elected to its executive committee under the aegis of its president and benefactor Arnold Hills. An achievement while on the committee was the establishment of a Bayswater chapter. Some of the vegetarians Gandhi met were members of the Theosophical Society, which had been founded in 1875 to further universal brotherhood, and which was devoted to the study of Buddhist and Hindu literature. They encouraged Gandhi to join them in reading the Bhagavad Gita both in translation as well as in the original. Here Gandhi met Helena Blavatsky whom had an effect on Gandhi in formulating his future beliefs, saying "“Theosophy is the teaching of Madame Blavatsky... Theosophy is the brotherhood of man.”

Thomas Allinson, another LVS member, had been promoting newly available birth control methods, but Hills disapproved of these, believing they undermined public morality. He believed vegetarianism to be a moral movement and that Allinson should therefore no longer remain a member of the LVS. Gandhi shared Hills' views on the dangers of birth control, but defended Allinson's right to differ. It would have been hard for Gandhi to challenge Hills; Hills was 12 years his senior and unlike Gandhi, highly eloquent. Hills bankrolled the LVS and was a captain of industry with his Thames Ironworks company employing more than 6,000 people in the East End of London. Hills was also a highly accomplished sportsman who later founded the football club West Ham United. In his 1927 An Autobiography, Vol. I, Gandhi wrote:

The question deeply interested me ... I had a high regard for Mr. Hills and his generosity. But I thought it was quite improper to exclude a man from a vegetarian society simply because he refused to regard puritan morals as one of the objects of the society

A motion to remove Allinson was raised, and was debated and voted on by the committee. Gandhi's shyness was an obstacle to his defence of Allinson at the committee meeting. Gandhi wrote his views down on paper, but shyness prevented Gandhi from reading out his arguments, so Hills, the President, asked another committee member to read them out for him. Although some other members of the committee agreed with Gandhi, the vote was lost and Allinson was excluded. There were no hard feelings, with Hills proposing the toast at the LVS farewell dinner in honour of Gandhi's return to India.

=== Called to the bar ===
Gandhi, at age 22, was called to the bar in June 1891 and then left London for India, where he learned that his mother had died while he was in London and that his family had kept the news from Gandhi. His attempts at establishing a law practice in Bombay failed because Gandhi was psychologically unable to cross-examine witnesses. He returned to Rajkot to make a modest living drafting petitions for litigants, but Gandhi was forced to stop after running afoul of British officer Sam Sunny.

In 1893, a Muslim merchant in Kathiawar named Dada Abdullah contacted Gandhi. Abdullah owned a large successful shipping business in South Africa. His distant cousin in Johannesburg needed a lawyer, and they preferred someone with Kathiawari heritage. Gandhi inquired about his pay for the work. They offered a total salary of £105 (~$4,143 in 2023 money) plus travel expenses. He accepted it, knowing that it would be at least a one-year commitment in the Colony of Natal, South Africa, also a part of the British Empire.

== Civil rights activist in South Africa (1893–1914) ==
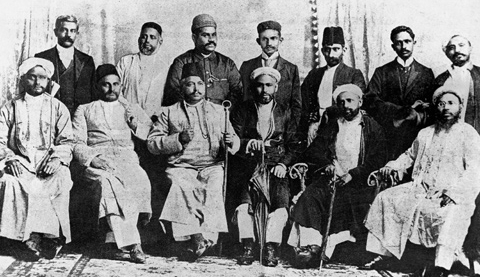
Gandhi and the founders of the Natal Indian Congress, 1895

In April 1893, Gandhi, aged 23, set sail for South Africa to be the lawyer for Abdullah's cousin. Gandhi spent 21 years in South Africa where he developed his political views, ethics, and politics. During this time Gandhi briefly returned to India in 1902 to mobilise support for the welfare of Indians in South Africa.

Immediately upon arriving in South Africa, Gandhi faced discrimination due to his skin colour and heritage. Gandhi was not allowed to sit with European passengers in the stagecoach and was told to sit on the floor near the driver, then beaten when he refused; elsewhere, Gandhi was kicked into a gutter for daring to walk near a house, in another instance thrown off a train at Pietermaritzburg after refusing to leave the first-class. Gandhi sat in the train station, shivering all night and pondering if he should return to India or protest for his rights. Gandhi chose to protest and was allowed to board the train the next day. In another incident, the magistrate of a Durban court ordered Gandhi to remove his turban, which he refused to do. Indians were not allowed to walk on public footpaths in South Africa. Gandhi was kicked by a police officer out of the footpath onto the street without warning.

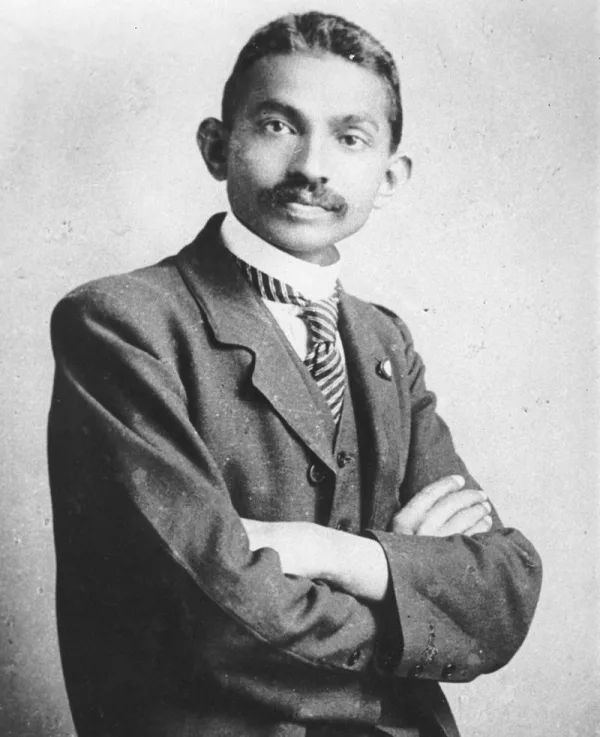
Gandhi in South Africa, 1906

When Gandhi arrived in South Africa, according to Arthur Herman, he thought of himself as "a Briton first, and an Indian second." However, the prejudice against Gandhi and his fellow Indians from British people that Gandhi experienced and observed deeply bothered him. Gandhi found it humiliating, struggling to understand how some people can feel honour, superiority or pleasure in such inhumane practices. Gandhi began to question his people's standing in the British Empire.

The Abdullah case that had brought him to South Africa concluded in May 1894, and the Indian community organised a farewell party for Gandhi as he prepared to return to India. The farewell party was turned into a working committee to plan the resistance to a new Natal government discriminatory proposal. This led to Gandhi extending his original period of stay in South Africa. Gandhi planned to assist Indians in opposing a bill to deny them the right to vote, a right then proposed to be an exclusive European right. He asked Joseph Chamberlain, the British Colonial Secretary, to reconsider his position on this bill. Though unable to halt the bill's passage, Gandhi's campaign was successful in drawing attention to the grievances of Indians in South Africa. He helped found the Natal Indian Congress in 1894, and through this organisation, Gandhi moulded the Indian community of South Africa into a unified political force. In January 1897, when Gandhi landed in Durban, a mob of white settlers attacked him. Gandhi refused to press charges against any member of the mob.

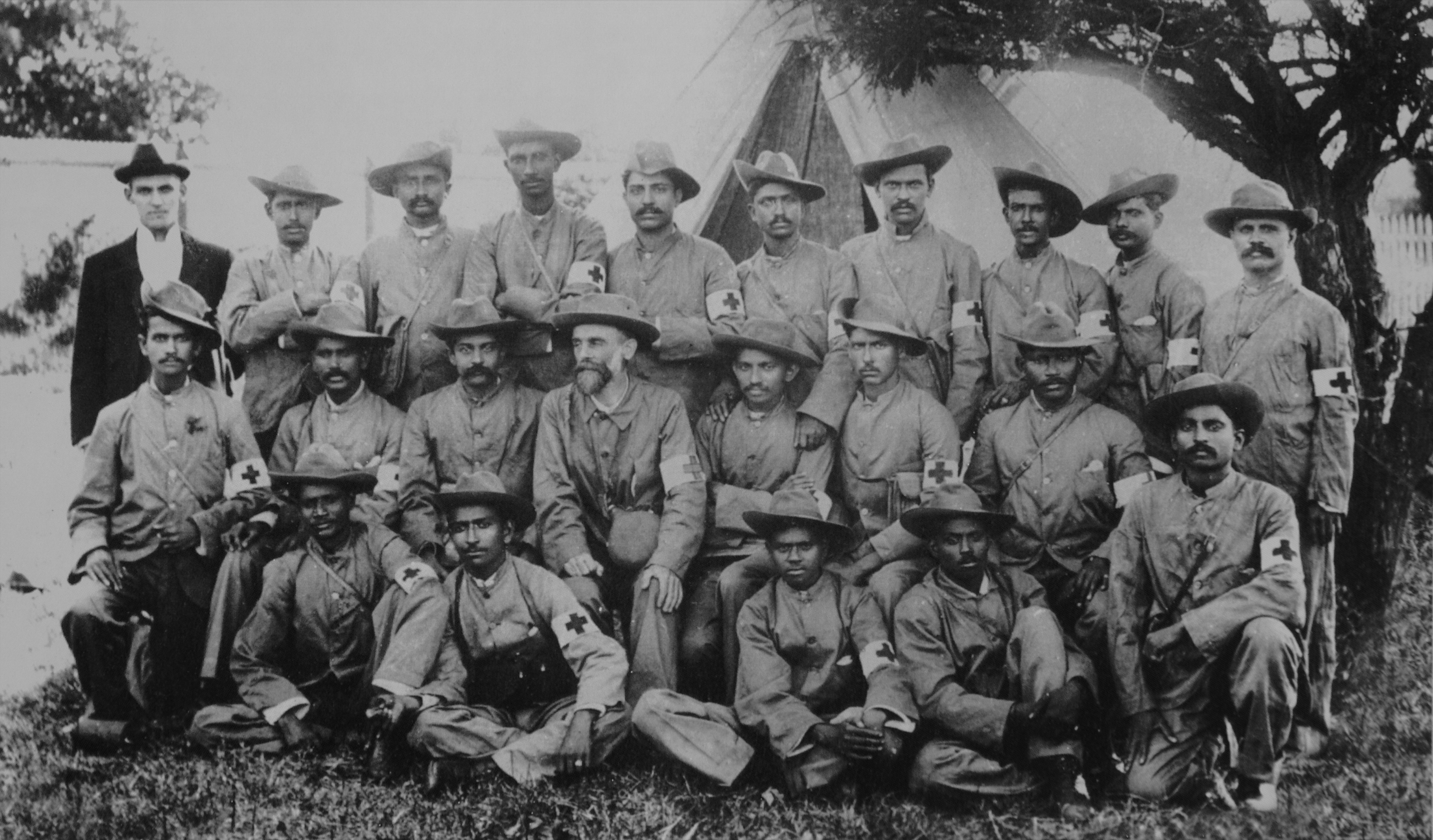
Gandhi (middle, third from right) with the stretcher-bearers of the Indian Ambulance Corps during the Boer War

During the Boer War, Gandhi volunteered in 1900 to form a group of stretcher-bearers as the Natal Indian Ambulance Corps. According to Arthur Herman, Gandhi wanted to disprove the British colonial stereotype that Hindus were not fit for "manly" activities involving danger and exertion, unlike the Muslim "martial races." Gandhi raised 1,100 Indian volunteers to support British combat troops against the Boers. They were trained and medically certified to serve on the front lines. They were auxiliaries at the Battle of Colenso to a White volunteer ambulance corps. At the Battle of Spion Kop, Gandhi and his bearers moved to the front line and had to carry wounded soldiers for miles to a field hospital since the terrain was too rough for the ambulances. Gandhi and 37 other Indians received the Queen's South Africa Medal.

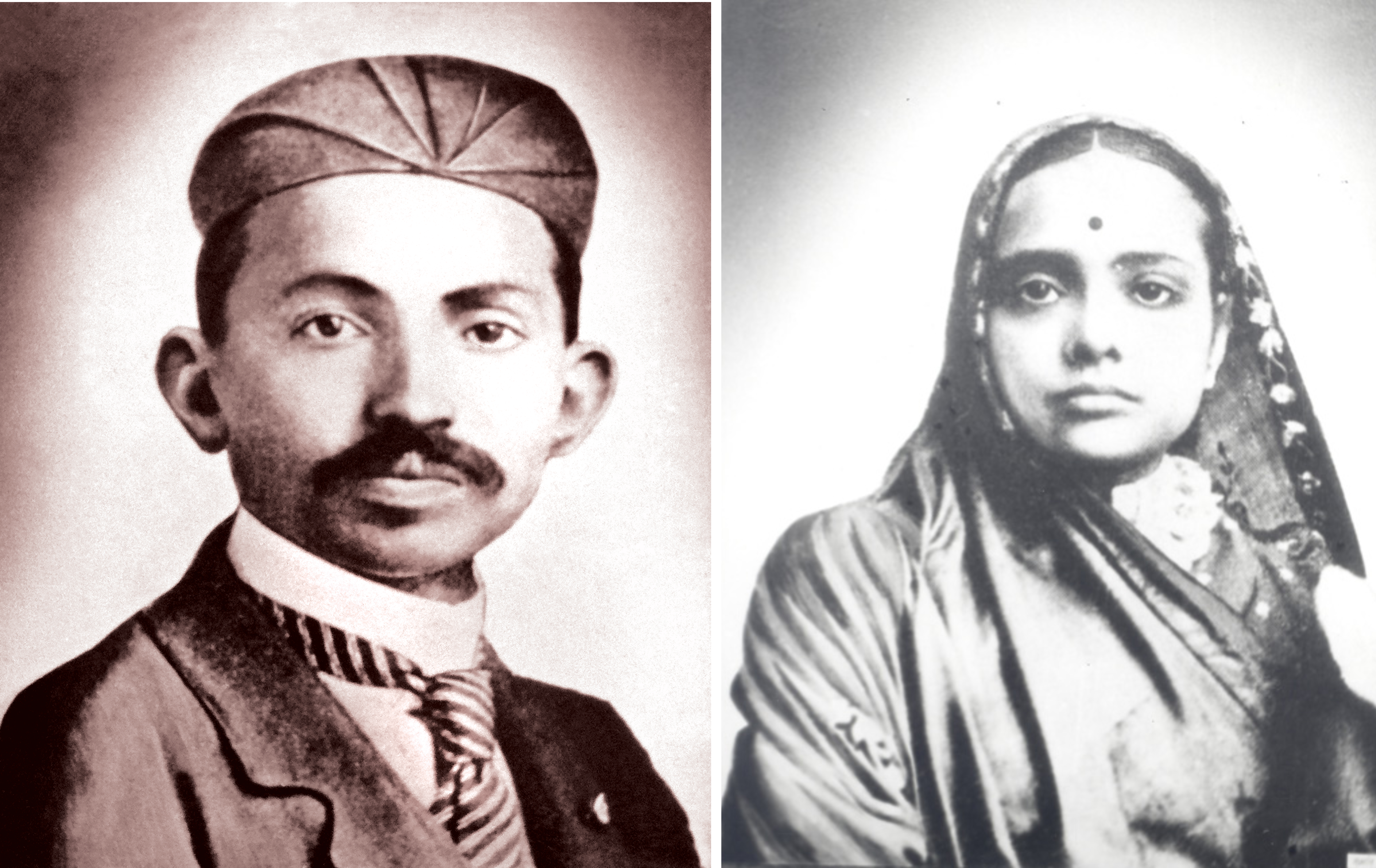
Gandhi and his wife Kasturba (1902)

In 1906, the Transvaal government promulgated a new Act compelling registration of the colony's Indian and Chinese populations. The law required Asians to undergo fingerprint registration and to carry identity certificates that officials could demand at any time. Historians have noted that Gandhi's resistance was therefore also a protest against a system of biometric identification that treated Indians as criminal subjects. Gandhi initially accepted voluntary registration as a gesture of trust, but later realized that once fingerprints were recorded, individuals lost the right to withdraw their consent. This then shaped Gandhi's understanding of Satyagraha as a defense of dignity and personal autonomy. At a mass protest meeting held in Johannesburg on 11 September that year, Gandhi adopted his still evolving methodology of Satyagraha (devotion to the truth), or nonviolent protest, for the first time. According to Anthony Parel, Gandhi was also influenced by the Tamil moral text Tirukkuṛaḷ after Leo Tolstoy mentioned it in their correspondence that began with "A Letter to a Hindu". Gandhi urged Indians to defy the new law and to suffer the punishments for doing so. His ideas of protests, persuasion skills, and public relations had emerged. Gandhi took these back to India in 1915.

=== Europeans, Indians and Africans ===
Gandhi focused his attention on Indians and Africans while he was in South Africa. Initially, Gandhi was not interested in politics, but this changed after he was discriminated against and bullied, such as by being thrown out of a train coach due to his skin colour by a white train official. After several such incidents with Whites in South Africa, Gandhi's thinking and focus changed, and he felt he must resist this and fight for rights. Gandhi entered politics by forming the Natal Indian Congress. According to Ashwin Desai and Goolam Vahed, Gandhi's views on racism are contentious in some cases. He suffered persecution from the beginning in South Africa. Like with other coloured people, white officials denied Gandhi his rights, and the press and those in the streets bullied and called Gandhi a "parasite", "semi-barbarous", "canker", "squalid coolie", "yellow man", and other epithets. People would even spit on him as an expression of racial hate.

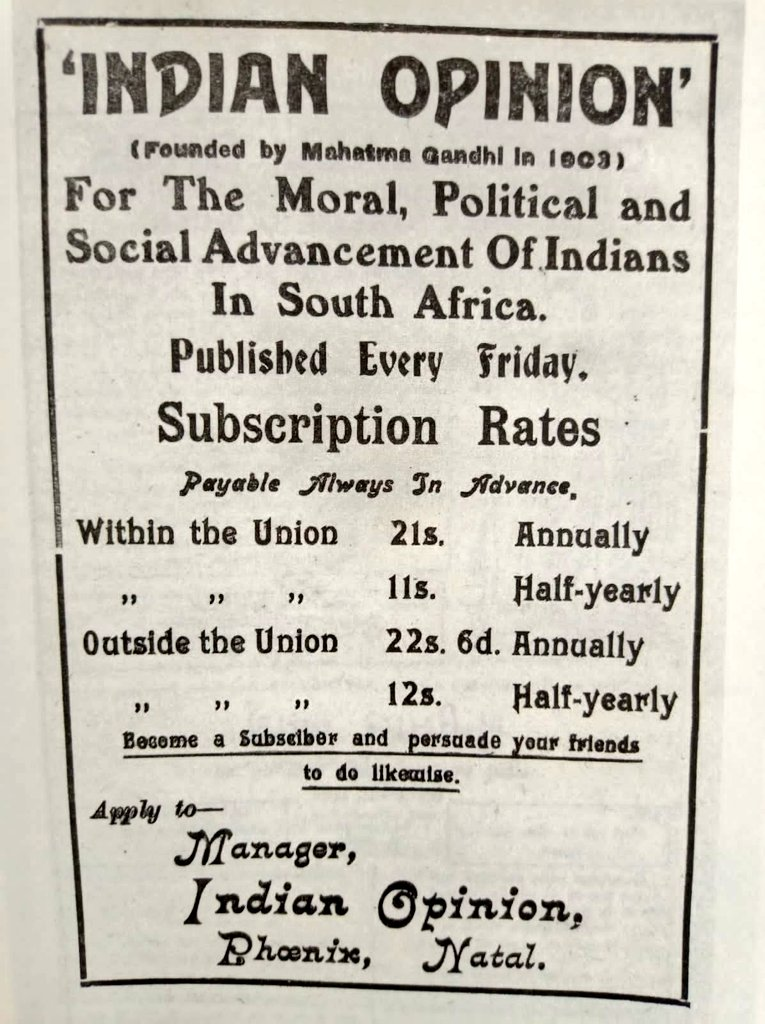
Advertisement of the Indian Opinion, a newspaper founded by Gandhi

While in South Africa, Gandhi focused on the racial persecution of Indians before he started to focus on racism against Africans. In some cases, state Desai and Vahed, Gandhi's behaviour was one of being a willing part of racial stereotyping and African exploitation. During a speech in September 1896, Gandhi complained that the whites in the British colony of South Africa were "degrading the Indian to the level of a raw Kaffir." Scholars cite it as an example of evidence that Gandhi at that time thought of Indians and black South Africans differently. As another example given by Herman, Gandhi, at the age of 24, prepared a legal brief for the Natal Assembly in 1895, seeking voting rights for Indians. Gandhi cited race history and European Orientalists' opinions that "Anglo-Saxons and Indians are sprung from the same Aryan stock or rather the Indo-European peoples" and argued that Indians should not be grouped with the Africans.

Years later, Gandhi and his colleagues served and helped Africans as nurses and by opposing racism. The Nobel Peace Prize winner Nelson Mandela is among admirers of Gandhi's efforts to fight against racism in Africa. The general image of Gandhi, state Desai and Vahed, has been reinvented since his assassination as though Gandhi was always a saint, when in reality, his life was more complex, contained inconvenient truths, and was one that changed over time. Scholars have also pointed the evidence to a rich history of co-operation and efforts by Gandhi and Indian people with nonwhite South Africans against persecution of Africans and the Apartheid.

In 1903, Gandhi started the Indian Opinion, a journal that carried news of Indians in South Africa, Indians in India with articles on all subjects – social, moral and intellectual. Each issue was multi-lingual and carried material in English, Gujarati, Hindi and Tamil. It carried ads, depended heavily on Gandhi's contributions (often printed without a byline) and was an "advocate" for the Indian cause.

In 1906, when the Bambatha Rebellion broke out in the colony of Natal, the then 36-year-old Gandhi, despite sympathising with the Zulu rebels, encouraged Indian South Africans to form a volunteer stretcher-bearer unit. Writing in the Indian Opinion, Gandhi argued that military service would be beneficial to the Indian community and claimed it would give them "health and happiness." Gandhi eventually led a volunteer mixed unit of Indian and African stretcher-bearers to treat wounded combatants during the suppression of the rebellion.

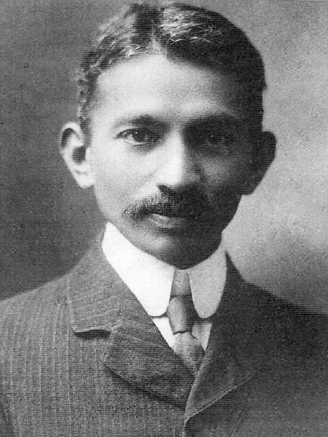
Gandhi photographed in South Africa (1909)

The medical unit commanded by Gandhi operated for less than two months before being disbanded. By 1910, Gandhi's newspaper, Indian Opinion, was covering reports on discrimination against Africans by the colonial regime. Gandhi remarked that the Africans "alone are the original inhabitants of the land. … The whites, on the other hand, have occupied the land forcibly and appropriated it for themselves."

In 1910, Gandhi established, with the help of his friend Hermann Kallenbach, an idealistic community they named Tolstoy Farm near Johannesburg. There, Gandhi nurtured his policy of peaceful resistance. In the years after black South Africans gained the right to vote in South Africa (1994), Gandhi was proclaimed a national hero with numerous monuments.

== Struggle for Indian independence (1915–1947) ==
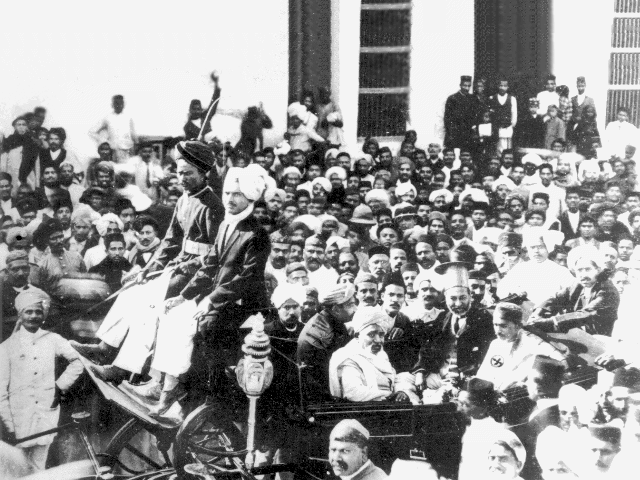
Welcome received at Karachi after Gandhi's (seated in carriage on the right) return to India (1916)

At the request of Gopal Krishna Gokhale, Gandhi returned to India in 1915.

Gandhi joined the Indian National Congress and was introduced to Indian issues, politics and the Indian people primarily by Gokhale. Gokhale was a key leader of the Congress Party best known for his restraint and moderation, and his insistence on working inside the system. Gandhi took Gokhale's liberal approach based on British Whiggish traditions and transformed it to make it look Indian.

Gandhi took leadership of the Congress in 1920 and began escalating demands until on 26 January 1930 the Indian National Congress declared the independence of India. The British did not recognise the declaration, but negotiations ensued, with the Congress taking a role in provincial government in the late 1930s. Gandhi and the Congress withdrew their support of the Raj when the Viceroy declared war on Germany in September 1939 without consultation. Tensions escalated until Gandhi demanded immediate independence in 1942, and the British responded by imprisoning him and tens of thousands of Congress leaders. Meanwhile, the Muslim League did co-operate with Britain and moved, against Gandhi's strong opposition, to demands for a totally separate Muslim state of Pakistan. In August 1947, the British partitioned the land with India and Pakistan each achieving independence on terms that Gandhi disapproved.

=== Role in World War I ===
In April 1918, during the latter part of World War I, the Viceroy invited Gandhi to a War Conference in Delhi. Gandhi agreed to support the war effort. In contrast to the Zulu War of 1906 and the outbreak of World War I in 1914, when he recruited volunteers for the Ambulance Corps, this time Gandhi attempted to recruit combatants. In a June 1918 leaflet entitled "Appeal for Enlistment", Gandhi wrote: "To bring about such a state of things we should have the ability to defend ourselves, that is, the ability to bear arms and to use them... If we want to learn the use of arms with the greatest possible despatch, it is our duty to enlist ourselves in the army." However, Gandhi stipulated in a letter to the Viceroy's private secretary that he "personally will not kill or injure anybody, friend or foe."

Gandhi's support for the war campaign brought into question his consistency on nonviolence. Gandhi's private secretary noted that "The question of the consistency between his creed of 'Ahimsa' (nonviolence) and his recruiting campaign was raised not only then but has been discussed ever since." According to political and educational scientist Christian Bartolf, Gandhi's support for the war stemmed from his belief that true ahimsa could not exist simultaneously with cowardice. Therefore, Gandhi felt that Indians needed to be willing and capable of using arms before they voluntarily chose non-violence.

In July 1918, Gandhi said that he could not persuade even one individual to enlist for the world war. "So far I have not a single recruit to my credit apart," Gandhi wrote. He added: "They object because they fear to die."

=== Champaran agitations ===
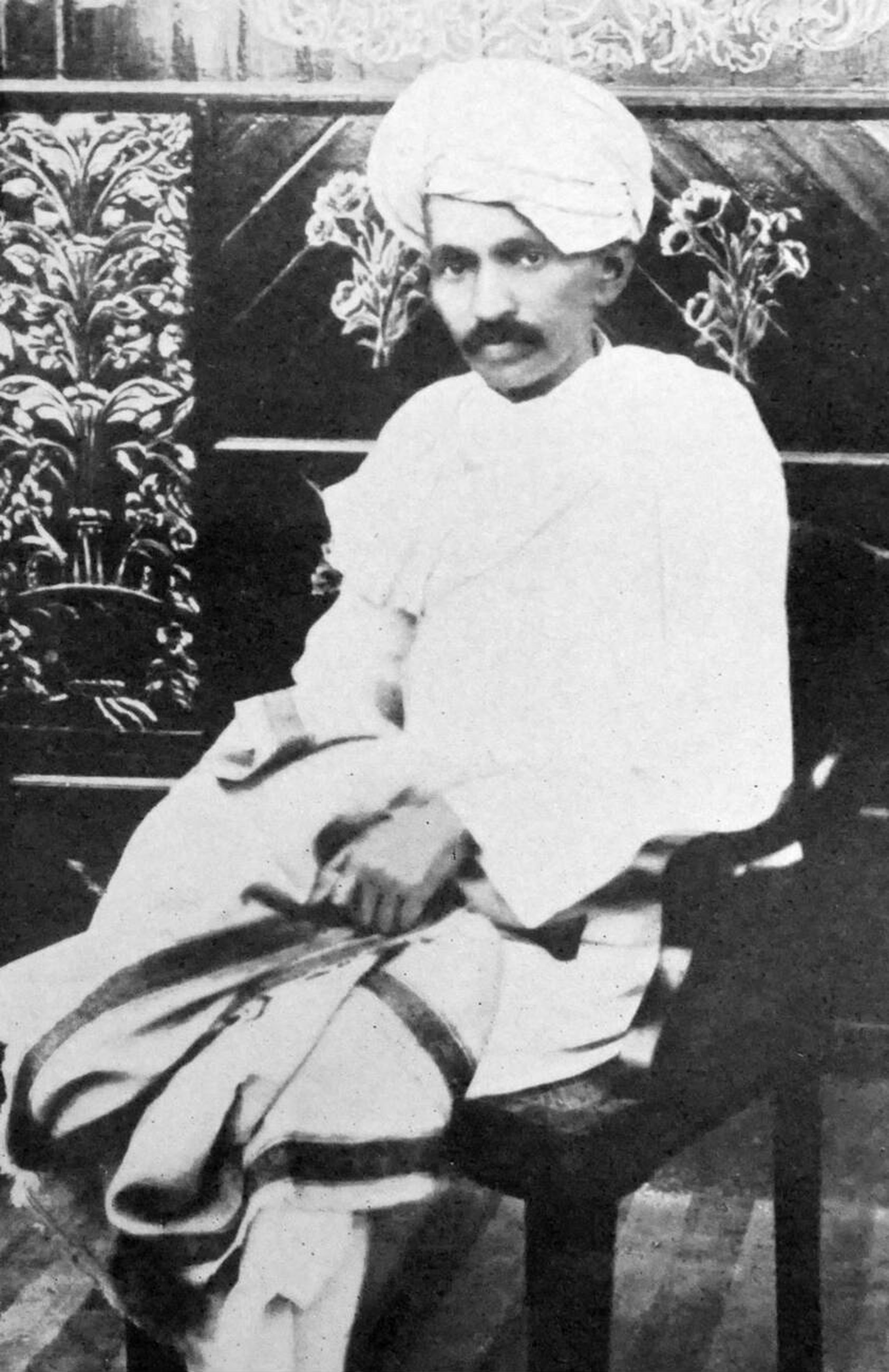
Gandhi in 1918, at the time of the Kheda and Champaran Satyagrahas

Gandhi's first major achievement came in 1917 with the Champaran agitation in Bihar. The Champaran agitation pitted the local peasantry against largely Anglo-Indian plantation owners who were backed by the local administration. The peasants were forced to grow indigo (Indigofera sp.), a cash crop for Indigo dye whose demand had been declining over two decades and were forced to sell their crops to the planters at a fixed price. Unhappy with this, the peasantry appealed to Gandhi at his ashram in Ahmedabad. Pursuing a strategy of nonviolent protest, Gandhi took the administration by surprise and won concessions from the authorities.

=== Kheda agitations ===
In 1918, Kheda was hit by floods and famine and the peasantry was demanding relief from taxes. Gandhi moved his headquarters to Nadiad, organising scores of supporters and fresh volunteers from the region, the most notable being Vallabhbhai Patel. Using non-co-operation as a technique, Gandhi initiated a signature campaign where peasants pledged non-payment of revenue even under the threat of confiscation of land. A social boycott of mamlatdars and talatdars (revenue officials within the district) accompanied the agitation. Gandhi worked hard to win public support for the agitation across the country. For five months, the administration refused, but by the end of May 1918, the government gave way on important provisions and relaxed the conditions of payment of revenue tax until the famine ended. In Kheda, Vallabhbhai Patel represented the farmers in negotiations with the British, who suspended revenue collection and released all the prisoners.

=== Khilafat Movement ===
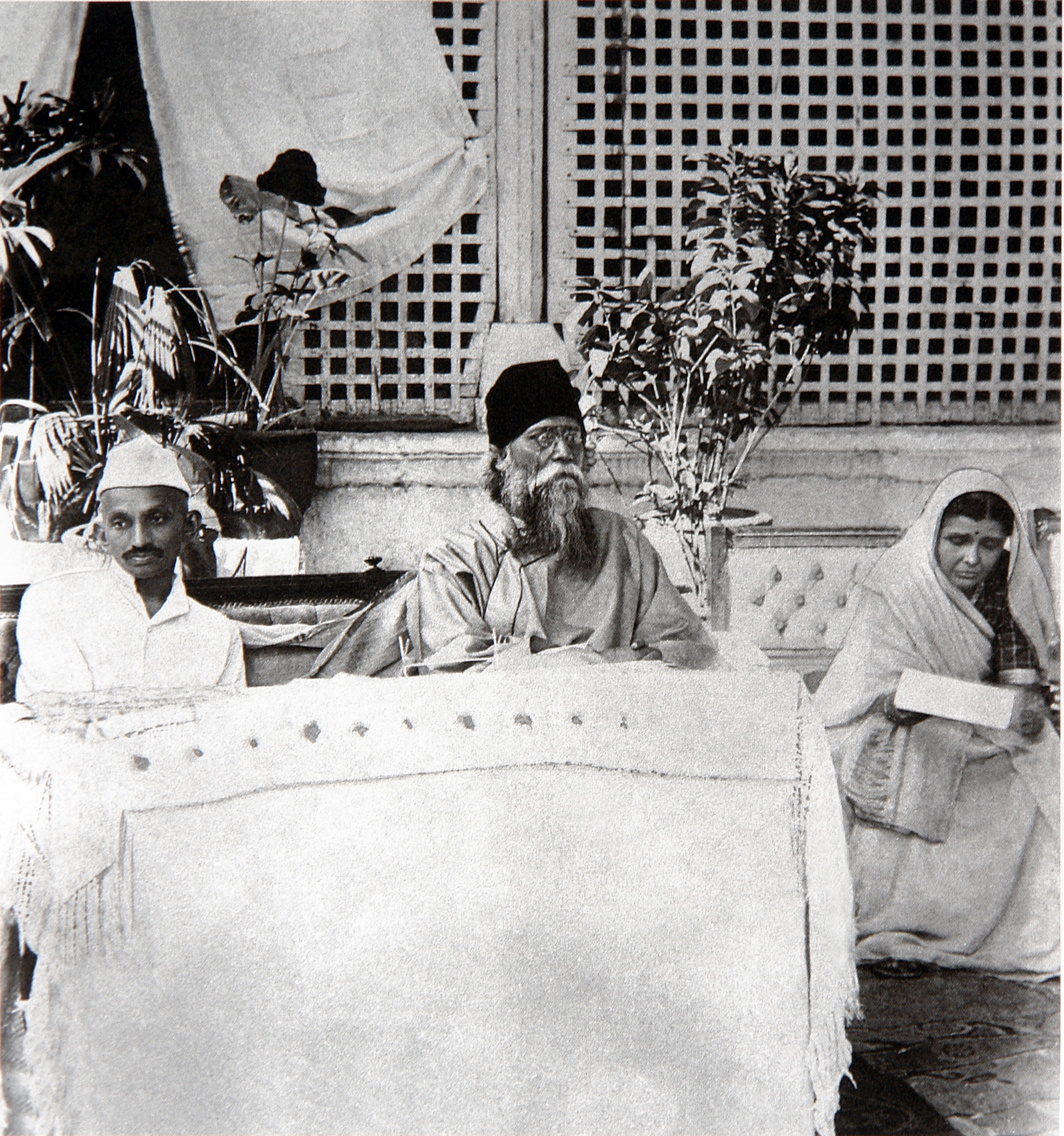
Gandhi (wearing a Gandhi cap) with Rabindranath Tagore and Sharda Mehta, 1920

In 1919, Gandhi sought Muslim co-operation by supporting the defeated Ottoman Empire. This was in part motivated by the British promise to reciprocate the help with swaraj (self-government) to Indians after the war. Instead, the British government offered only minor reforms, disappointing Gandhi. He announced his satyagraha (civil disobedience) intentions. The British countered with the Rowlatt Act to block Gandhi's movement, making civil disobedience a criminal offence and enabling internment without trial.

Gandhi leveraged the Khilafat Movement, wherein Sunni Muslims in India championed the Turkish Caliph as a symbol of Sunni Islam (ummah). Gandhi's support gave mixed results. It initially brought strong Muslim support. However, Hindu leaders including Rabindranath Tagore questioned Gandhi's leadership because they opposed recognising the Caliph.

Gandhi's increased Muslim support temporarily stopped Hindu-Muslim communal violence, and helped sideline Muhammad Ali Jinnah. Jinnah went on to lead the demand for a Muslim homeland. Though they agreed on Indian independence, they disagreed on the means of achieving it. Jinnah favoured constitutional negotiation, rather than agitating the masses.

In 1922, the Khilafat Movement collapsed following the end of the non-cooperation movement and Gandhi's arrest. A number of Muslim leaders abandoned Gandhi and Congress. Hindu-Muslim communal conflicts reignited, and deadly religious riots re-appeared in numerous cities.

=== Non-cooperation movement ===
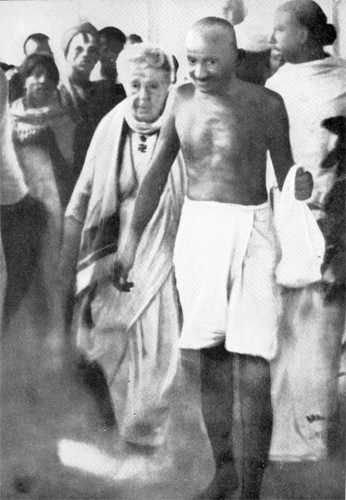
Gandhi with Annie Besant en route to a meeting in Madras in September 1921. Earlier, in Madurai, on 21 September 1921, Gandhi had adopted the loin-cloth for the first time as a symbol of his identification with India's poor.

With his book Hind Swaraj (1909) Gandhi, aged 40, declared that British rule was established in India with the co-operation of Indians and had survived only because of this. If Indians refused to co-operate, British rule would collapse and swaraj (Indian independence) would come. In February 1919, Gandhi cautioned the Viceroy of India that the Rowlatt Act would result in civil disobedience. The British government ignored him, and the satyagraha civil disobedience followed, with British law officers firing on unarmed people. Riots followed; Gandhi urged peaceful protest. The Jallianwala Bagh massacre enraged the subcontinent. Gandhi criticised his fellow countrymen for not exclusively using "love" to deal with the "hate" of the British government. Gandhi shifted his attention to swaraj and political independence for India. In 1921, Gandhi became the leader of the Indian National Congress. Gandhi expanded his nonviolence to include the swadeshi policy – the boycott of foreign-made goods, especially British goods, and to boycott British institutions and law courts. Gandhi was arrested on 10 March 1922, tried for sedition, and sentenced to six years' imprisonment.

=== Salt Satyagraha (Salt March/Civil Disobedience Movement) ===
Original footage of Gandhi and his followers marching to Dandi in the Salt Satyagraha

After his release from prison in 1924, Gandhi continued to pursue swaraj. He pushed through a resolution at the Calcutta Congress in December 1928 calling on the British government to grant India dominion status or face further non-cooperation. The British did not respond favourably. Gandhi led Congress in a celebration on 26 January 1930 of India's Independence Day in Lahore. Gandhi launched a new Satyagraha against the British salt tax in March 1930, condemning British rule in a letter to the viceroy.

This was highlighted by the Salt March from 12 March to 6 April, where Gandhi and volunteers marched 388 kilometres (241 mi) from Ahmedabad to Dandi, Gujarat to make salt himself, with the declared intention of breaking the salt laws, watched by huge crowds. On 5 May, Gandhi was interned under a regulation dating from 1827 in anticipation of a planned protest. The protest at Dharasana salt works on 21 May went ahead without Gandhi and was brutally suppressed. The campaign succeeded in upsetting the British; Britain responded by imprisoning at least 60,000 people.

=== Gandhi as folk hero ===
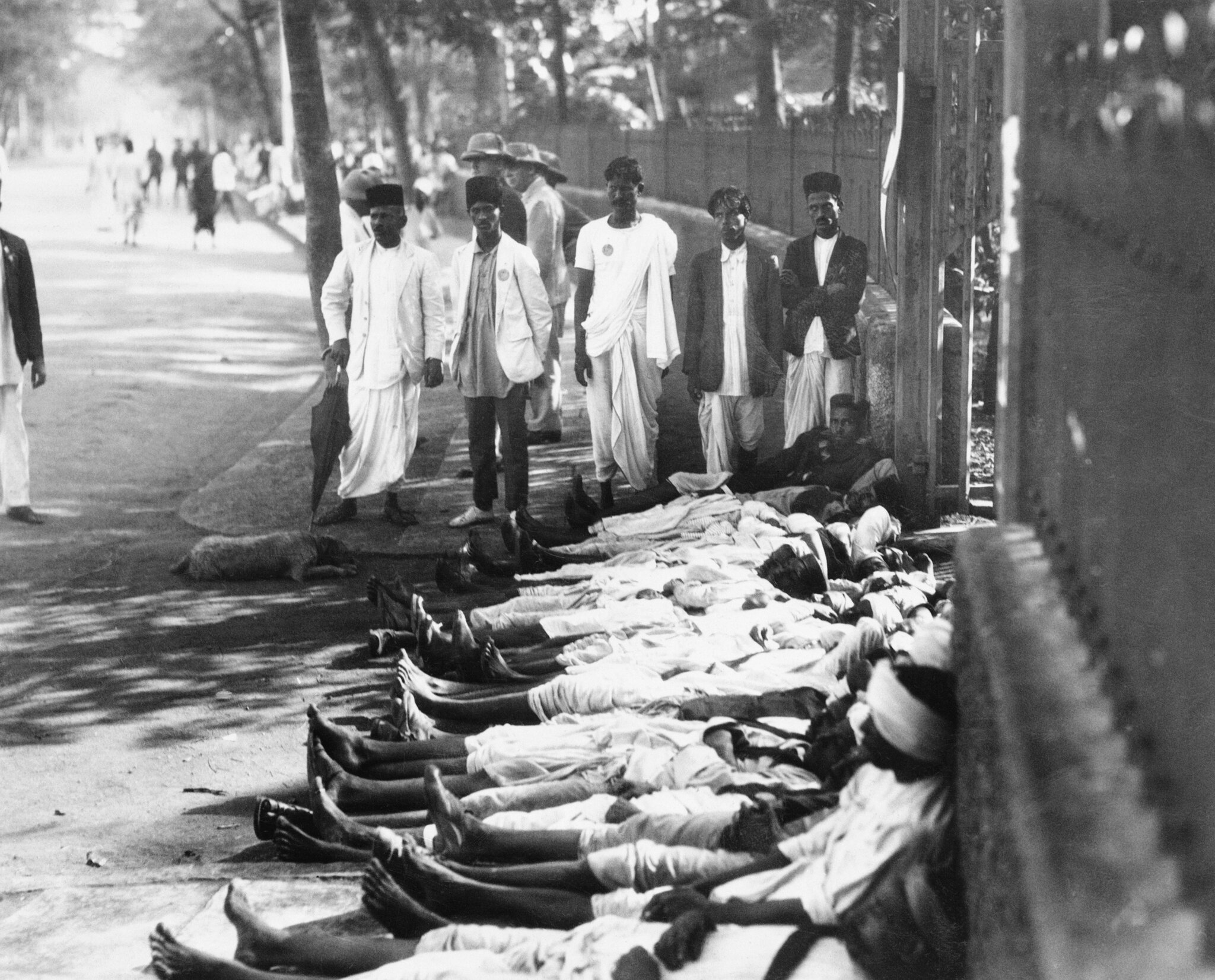
Indian workers on strike in support of Gandhi in 1930

Indian Congress in the 1920s appealed to Andhra Pradesh peasants by creating Telugu language plays that combined Indian mythology and legends, linked them to Gandhi's ideas, and portrayed Gandhi as a messiah, a reincarnation of ancient and medieval Indian nationalist leaders and saints. The plays built support among peasants steeped in traditional Hindu culture, according to Murali, and this effort made Gandhi a folk hero in Telugu speaking villages, a sacred messiah-like figure.

According to Dennis Dalton, it was Gandhi's ideas that were responsible for his wide following. Gandhi criticised Western civilisation as one driven by "brute force and immorality", contrasting it with his categorisation of Indian civilisation as one driven by "soul force and morality". Gandhi captured the imagination of the people of his heritage with his ideas about winning "hate with love". These ideas are evidenced in his pamphlets from the 1890s, in South Africa, where too Gandhi was popular among the Indian indentured workers. After he returned to India, people flocked to Gandhi because he reflected their values.

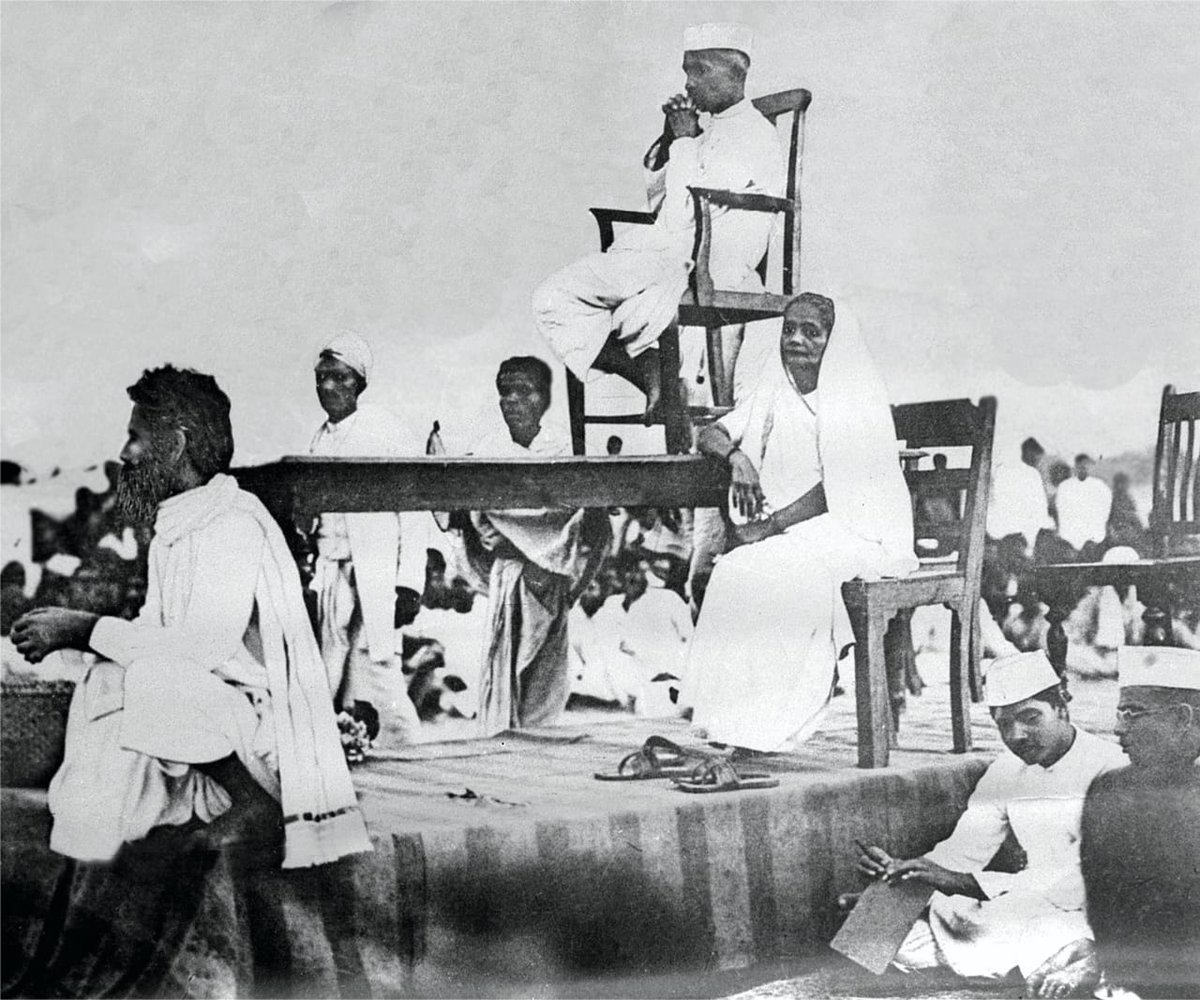
Gandhi's first visit to Odisha in 1921, a general meeting held at the riverbed of Kathajodi

Gandhi also campaigned hard going from one rural corner of the Indian subcontinent to another. He used terminology and phrases such as Rama-rajya from Ramayana, Prahlada as a paradigmatic icon, and such cultural symbols as another facet of swaraj and satyagraha. During Gandhi's lifetime, these ideas sounded strange outside India, but they readily and deeply resonated with the culture and historic values of his people.

=== Negotiations ===
The government, represented by Lord Irwin, the Viceroy of India, decided to negotiate with Gandhi. The Gandhi–Irwin Pact was signed in March 1931. The British Government agreed to free all political prisoners, in return for the suspension of the civil disobedience movement. According to the pact, Gandhi was invited to attend the Round Table Conference in London for discussions and as the sole representative of the Indian National Congress. The conference was a disappointment to Gandhi and the nationalists. Gandhi expected to discuss India's independence, while the British side focused on the Indian princes and Indian minorities rather than on a transfer of power. Lord Irwin's successor, Lord Willingdon, took a hard line against India as an independent nation, began a new campaign of controlling and subduing the nationalist movement. Gandhi was again arrested, and the government tried and failed to negate his influence by completely isolating him from his followers.

In Britain, Winston Churchill, a prominent Conservative politician who was then out of office but later became its prime minister, became a vigorous and articulate critic of Gandhi and opponent of his long-term plans. Churchill said in a widely reported 1931 speech:

It is alarming and also nauseating to see Mr Gandhi, a seditious Middle Temple lawyer, now posing as a fakir of a type well known in the East, striding half-naked up the steps of the Vice-regal palace....to parley on equal terms with the representative of the King-Emperor.

Churchill's bitterness against Gandhi grew in the 1930s. He called Gandhi as the one who was "seditious in aim" whose evil genius and multiform menace was attacking the British empire. Churchill called him a dictator, a "Hindu Mussolini", fomenting a race war, trying to replace the Raj with Brahmin cronies, playing on the ignorance of Indian masses, all for selfish gain. Churchill attempted to isolate Gandhi, and his criticism of Gandhi was widely covered by European and American press. It gained Churchill sympathetic support, but it also increased support for Gandhi among Europeans. The developments heightened Churchill's anxiety that the "British themselves would give up out of pacifism and misplaced conscience."

=== Round Table Conferences ===
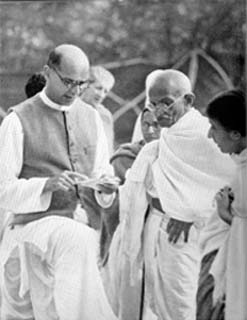
Gandhi and his personal assistant Mahadev Desai at Birla House, 1939

During the discussions between Gandhi and the British government over 1931–32 at the Round Table Conferences, Gandhi, now aged about 62, sought constitutional reforms as a preparation to the end of colonial British rule, and begin the self-rule by Indians. The British side sought reforms that would keep the Indian subcontinent as a colony. The British negotiators proposed constitutional reforms on a British Dominion model that established separate electorates based on religious and social divisions. The British questioned the Congress party and Gandhi's authority to speak for all of India. They invited Indian religious leaders, such as Muslims and Sikhs, to press their demands along religious lines, as well as B. R. Ambedkar as the representative leader of the untouchables. Gandhi vehemently opposed a constitution that enshrined rights or representations based on communal divisions, because he feared that it would not bring people together but divide them, perpetuate their status, and divert the attention from India's struggle to end the colonial rule.

The Second Round Table conference was the only time Gandhi left India between 1914 and his death in 1948. He was accompanied by his secretary Mahadev Desai, son Devdas Gandhi and British supporter Mirabehn. Gandhi declined the government's offer of accommodation in an expensive West End hotel, preferring to stay in the East End, to live among working-class people, as he did in India. Gandhi based himself in a small cell-bedroom at his friend Muriel Lester's "People's House" at Kingsley Hall for the three-month duration of his stay. He was enthusiastically received by East Enders. Local children gave him toys for his birthday and Lester noted that he would gently place them on window sills and in carriages during his stay and took them back to India.

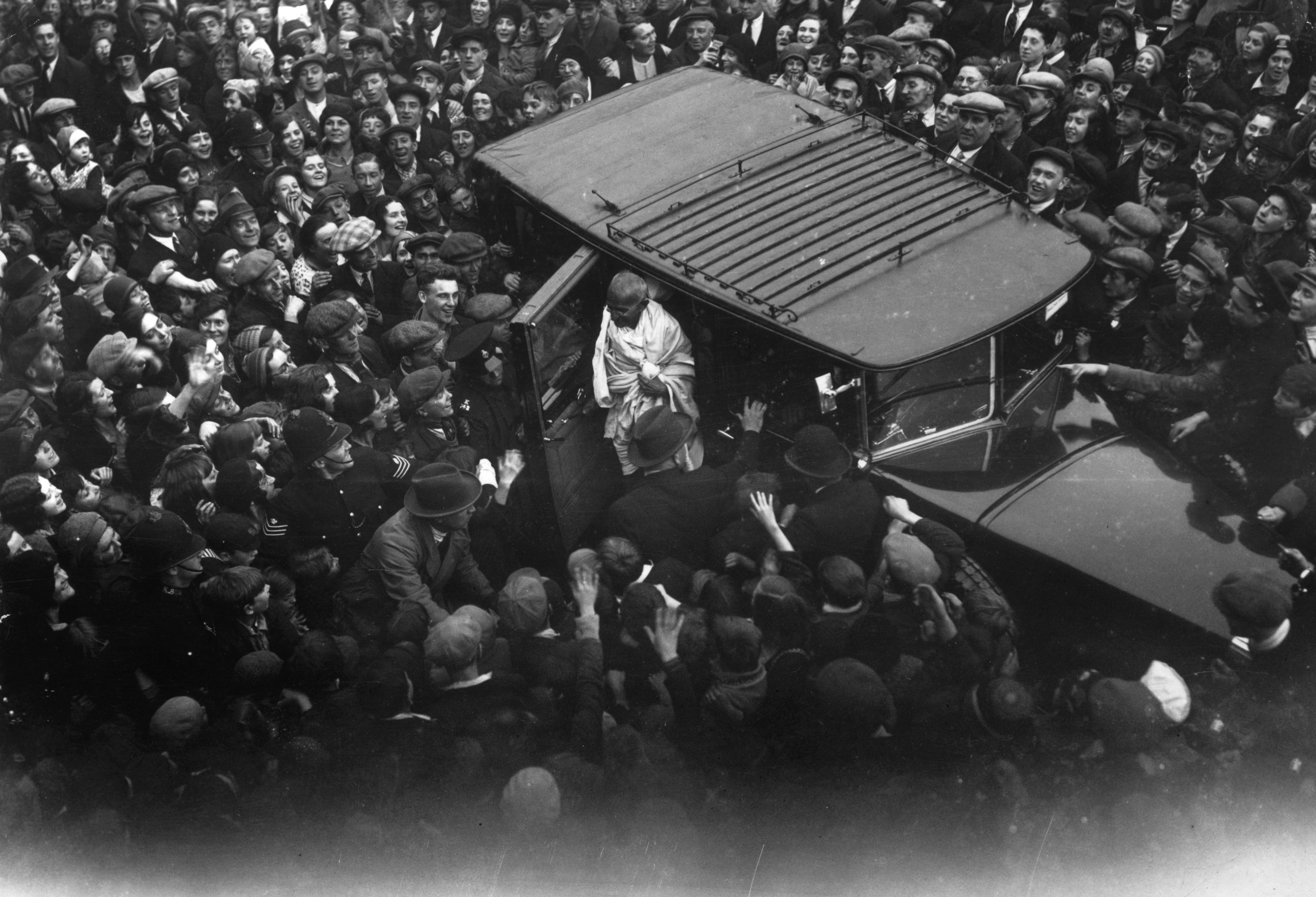
An admiring East End crowd gathers to witness the arrival of Mahatma Gandhi, 1931

After Gandhi returned from the Second Round Table conference, he started a new satyagraha. Gandhi was arrested and imprisoned at the Yerwada Jail, Pune. While he was in prison, the British government enacted a new law that granted untouchables a separate electorate. It came to be known as the Communal Award. In protest, Gandhi started a fast-unto-death, while he was held in prison. The resulting public outcry forced the government, in consultations with Ambedkar, to replace the Communal Award with a compromise Poona Pact.

=== Congress politics ===
In 1934, Gandhi resigned from Congress party membership. He did not disagree with the party's position, but felt that if he resigned, Gandhi's popularity with Indians would cease to stifle the party's membership, which actually varied, including communists, socialists, trade unionists, students, religious conservatives, and those with pro-business convictions, and that these various voices would get a chance to make themselves heard. Gandhi also wanted to avoid being a target for Raj propaganda by leading a party that had temporarily accepted political accommodation with the Raj.

In 1936, Gandhi returned to active politics again with the Nehru presidency and the Lucknow session of the Congress. Although Gandhi wanted a total focus on the task of winning independence and not speculation about India's future, he did not restrain the Congress from adopting socialism as its goal. Gandhi had a clash with Subhas Chandra Bose, who had been elected president in 1938, and who had previously expressed a lack of faith in nonviolence as a means of protest. Despite Gandhi's opposition, Bose won a second term as Congress President, against Gandhi's nominee, Bhogaraju Pattabhi Sitaramayya. Gandhi declared that Sitaramayya's defeat was his defeat. Bose later left the Congress when the All-India leaders resigned en masse in protest of his abandonment of the principles introduced by Gandhi.

=== World War II and Quit India movement ===
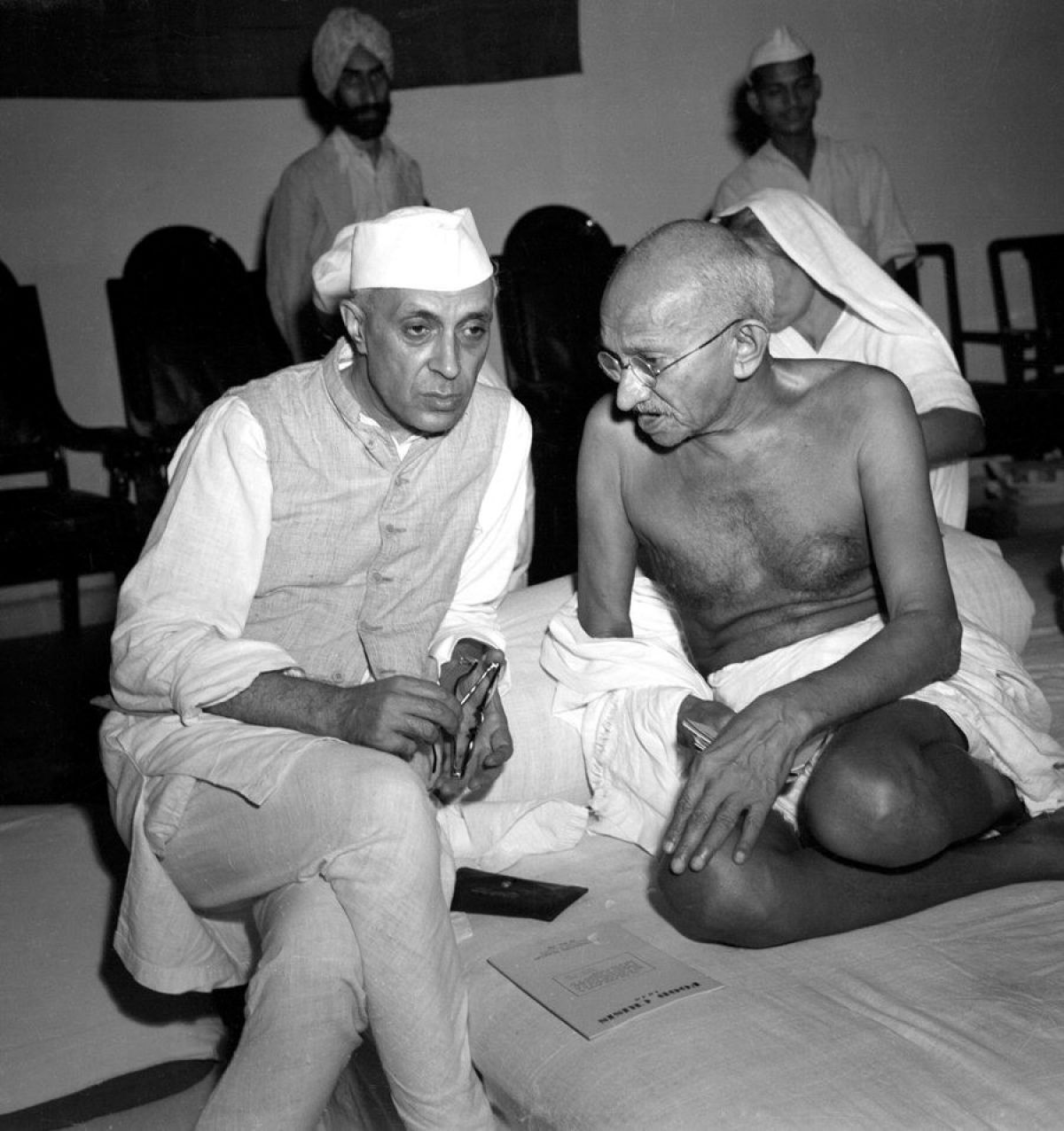
Gandhi talking with Jawaharlal Nehru, his designated political heir, during the drafting of the Quit India Resolution in Bombay, August 1942

Gandhi opposed helping the British war effort and campaigned against participation in World War II. The British government arrested Gandhi and killed over 1,000 members of the movement. Violent attacks were carried out by nationalists against the British. The movement played a role in weakening British control, and paved the way for Indian independence.

Gandhi was motivated by his belief that India could not be party to a war for democratic freedom while that freedom was denied to India. He explicitly called for the British to Quit India in a 1942 speech in Mumbai. The British government responded quickly, arresting Gandhi. Indians retaliated by damaging hundreds of government owned railway stations and police stations, and cutting telegraph wires.

In 1942, Gandhi urged his people to completely stop co-operating with the imperial government, again calling for non-violence. He urged Indians to karo ya maro ("do or die") in the cause of their rights and freedoms.

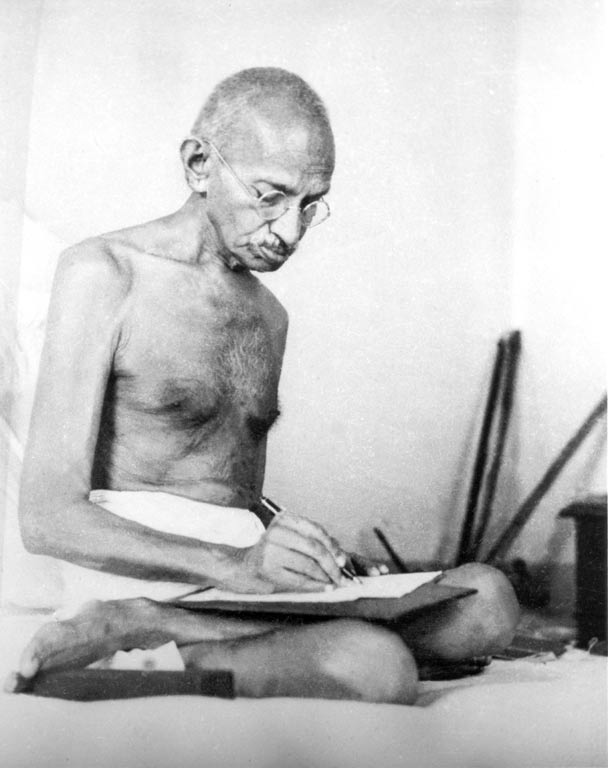
Gandhi in 1942, the year he launched the Quit India Movement

His arrest lasted two years. He was released before the end of the war on 6 May 1944 because of his failing health and necessary surgery; the Raj did not want him to die in prison and enrage the nation. Gandhi and Jinnah had extensive correspondence and the two men met several times in September 1944. Jinnah rejected Gandhi's proposal for Hindu-Muslim coexistence, insisting on partitioning the subcontinent on religious lines to create a Muslim homeland (later Pakistan). At the end of the war, the British gave clear indications that power would be transferred to Indian hands. Gandhi called off the struggle, and around 100,000 political prisoners were released, including the Congress's leadership.

=== Partition and independence ===
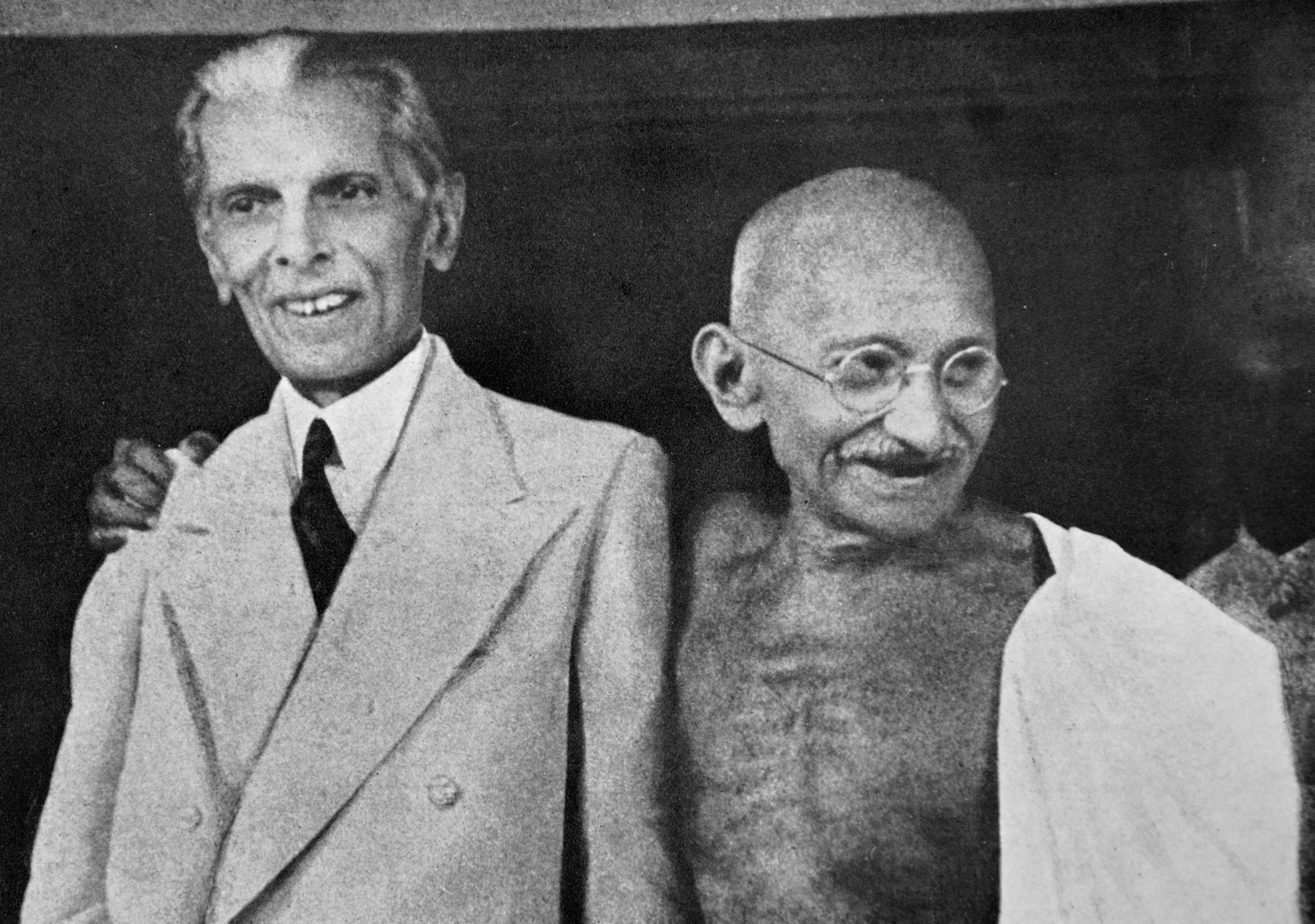
Gandhi with Muhammad Ali Jinnah in September 1944

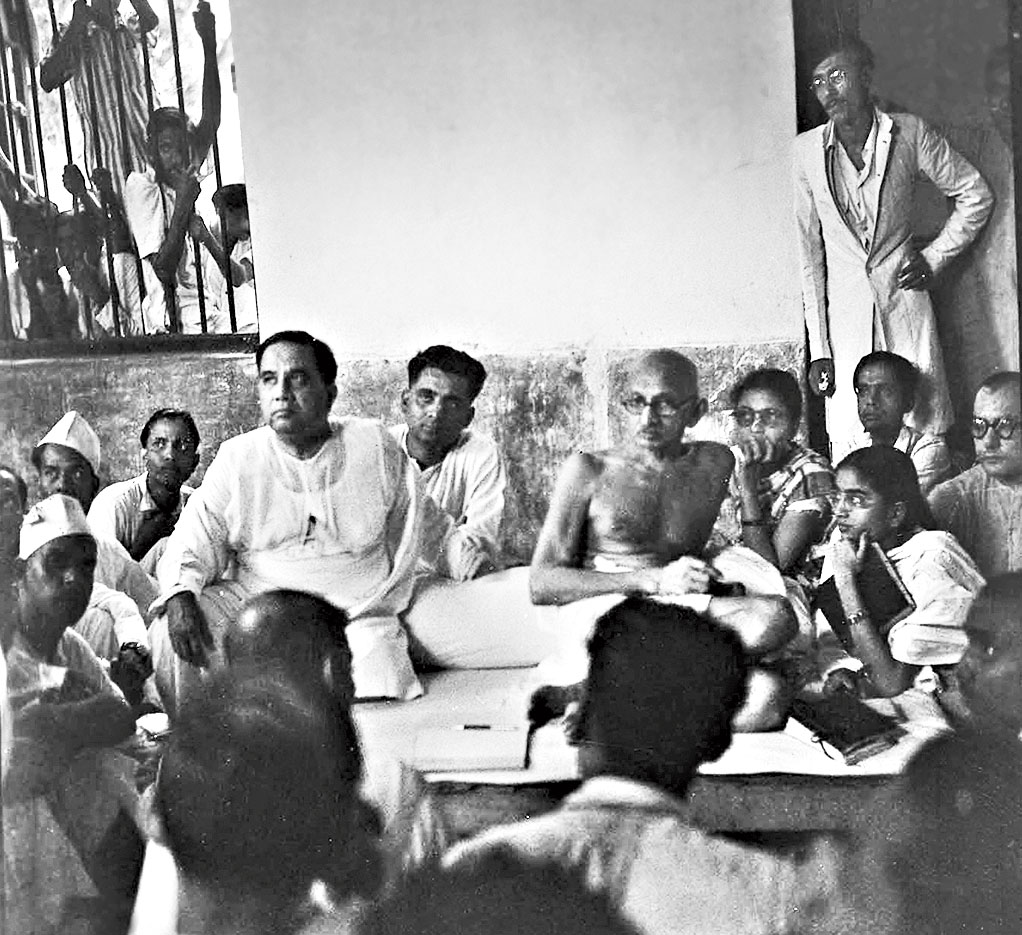
Gandhi with Huseyn Shaheed Suhrawardy (left) and Sheikh Mujibur Rahman (far right) during Noakhali riots in October 1946

Gandhi opposed the partition of the Indian subcontinent along religious lines. The Indian National Congress and Gandhi called for the British to Quit India. However, the All-India Muslim League demanded "Divide and Quit India." Gandhi suggested an agreement which required the Congress and the Muslim League to co-operate and attain independence under a provisional government, thereafter, the question of partition could be resolved by a plebiscite in the districts with a Muslim majority.

Jinnah rejected Gandhi's proposal and called for Direct Action Day, on 16 August 1946, to press Muslims to publicly gather in cities and support his proposal for the partition of the Indian subcontinent into a Muslim state and non-Muslim state. Huseyn Shaheed Suhrawardy, the Muslim League Chief Minister of Bengal – now Bangladesh and West Bengal (excluding Cooch Behar), gave Calcutta's police special holiday to celebrate the Direct Action Day. The Direct Action Day triggered a mass murder of Calcutta Hindus and the torching of their property, and holidaying police were missing to contain or stop the conflict. The British government did not order its army to move in to contain the violence. The violence on Direct Action Day led to retaliatory violence against Muslims across India. Thousands of Hindus and Muslims were murdered, and tens of thousands were injured in the cycle of violence in the days that followed. Gandhi visited the most riot-prone areas to appeal a stop to the massacres.

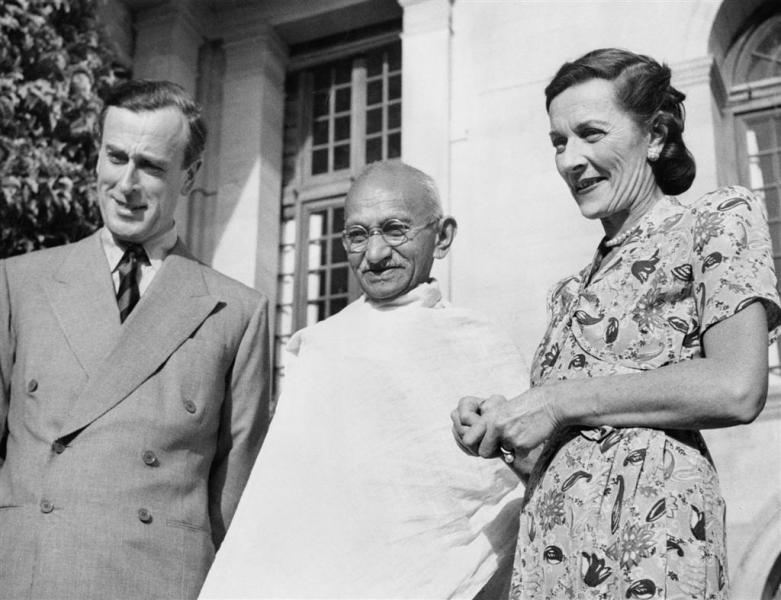
Gandhi (center) in 1947, with Louis Mountbatten, Britain's last Viceroy of India, and his wife Edwina Mountbatten

Archibald Wavell, the Viceroy and Governor-General of British India for three years through February 1947, had worked with Gandhi and Jinnah to find a common ground, before and after accepting Indian independence in principle. Wavell condemned Gandhi's character and motives as well as his ideas. Wavell accused Gandhi of harbouring the single-minded idea to "overthrow British rule and influence and to establish a Hindu raj", and called Gandhi a "malignant, malevolent, exceedingly shrewd" politician. Wavell feared a civil war on the Indian subcontinent, and doubted Gandhi would be able to stop it.

The British reluctantly agreed to grant independence to the people of the Indian subcontinent, but accepted Jinnah's proposal of partitioning the land into Pakistan and India. Gandhi was involved in the final negotiations, but Stanley Wolpert states the "plan to carve up British India was never approved of or accepted by Gandhi".

The partition was controversial and violently disputed. More than half a million were killed in religious riots as 10 million to 12 million non-Muslims (Hindus and Sikhs mostly) migrated from Pakistan into India, and Muslims migrated from India into Pakistan, across the newly created borders of India, West Pakistan and East Pakistan.

Gandhi spent the day of independence not celebrating the end of the British rule, but appealing for peace among his countrymen by fasting and spinning in Calcutta on 15 August 1947. The partition had gripped the Indian subcontinent with religious violence and the streets were filled with corpses. Gandhi's fasting and protests are credited for stopping the religious riots and communal violence. His final fast took place from 13–18 January 1948, just days before his assassination.

== Death ==
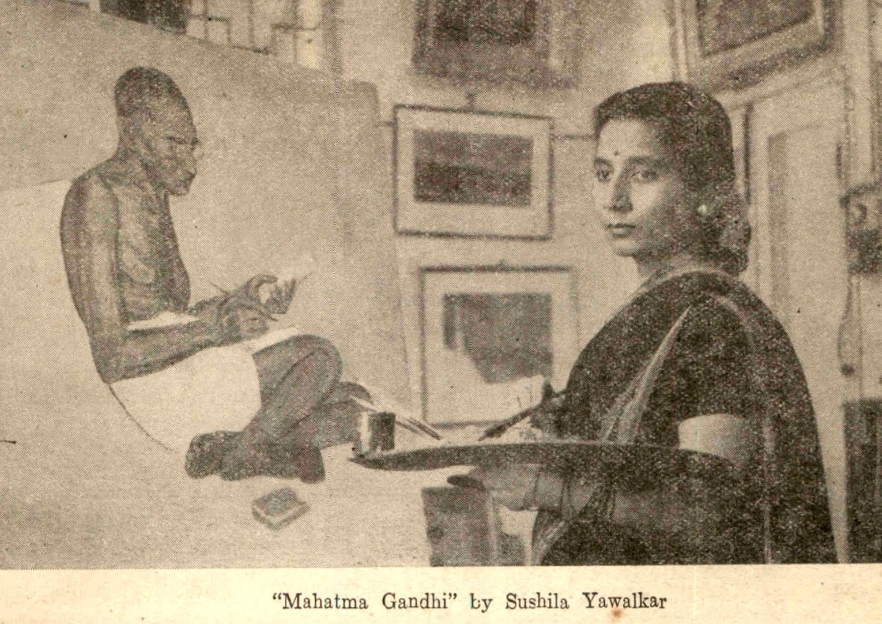
Sushila Yawalkar painting Gandhi in the year of his death

At 5:17 p.m. on 30 January 1948, Gandhi was with his grandnieces in the garden of Birla House (now Gandhi Smriti), on his way to address a prayer meeting, when Nathuram Godse, a Hindu nationalist, fired three bullets into Gandhi's chest from a pistol at close range. According to some accounts, Gandhi died instantly. In other accounts, such as one prepared by an eyewitness journalist, he was carried into the Birla House, into a bedroom. There, he died about 30 minutes later as a family member read verses from Hindu scriptures.

Prime Minister Jawaharlal Nehru addressed his countrymen over the All-India Radio saying:

Friends and comrades, the light has gone out of our lives, and there is darkness everywhere, and I do not quite know what to tell you or how to say it. Our beloved leader, Bapu as we called him, the father of the nation, is no more. Perhaps I am wrong to say that; nevertheless, we will not see him again, as we have seen him for these many years, we will not run to him for advice or seek solace from him, and that is a terrible blow, not only for me, but for millions and millions in this country.

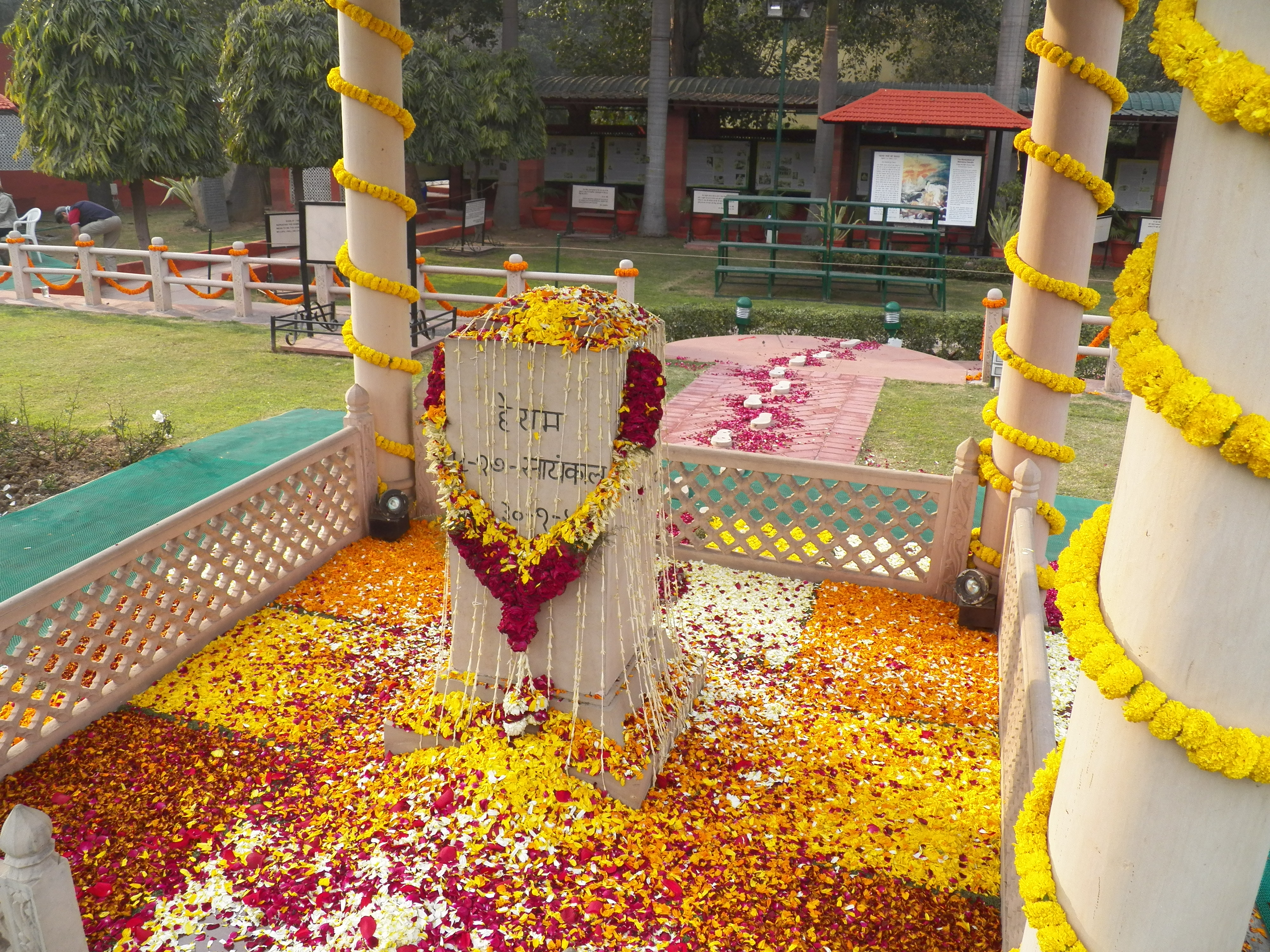
Memorial at the location of Gandhi's assassination in 1948. His stylised footsteps lead to the memorial.

Godse, a Hindu nationalist, with links to the Hindu Mahasabha and the Rashtriya Swayamsevak Sangh, made no attempt to escape; several other conspirators were soon arrested as well. The accused were Nathuram Vinayak Godse, Narayan Apte, Vinayak Damodar Savarkar, Shankar Kistayya, Dattatraya Parchure, Vishnu Karkare, Madanlal Pahwa, and Gopal Godse.

The trial began on 27 May 1948 and ran for eight months before Justice Atma Charan passed his final order on 10 February 1949. The prosecution called 149 witnesses, the defence none. The court found all of the defendants except one guilty as charged. Eight men were convicted for the murder conspiracy, and others were convicted for violation of the Explosive Substances Act. Savarkar was acquitted and set free. Nathuram Godse and Narayan Apte were sentenced to death by hanging while the remaining six (including Godse's brother, Gopal) were sentenced to life imprisonment.

=== Funeral and memorials ===
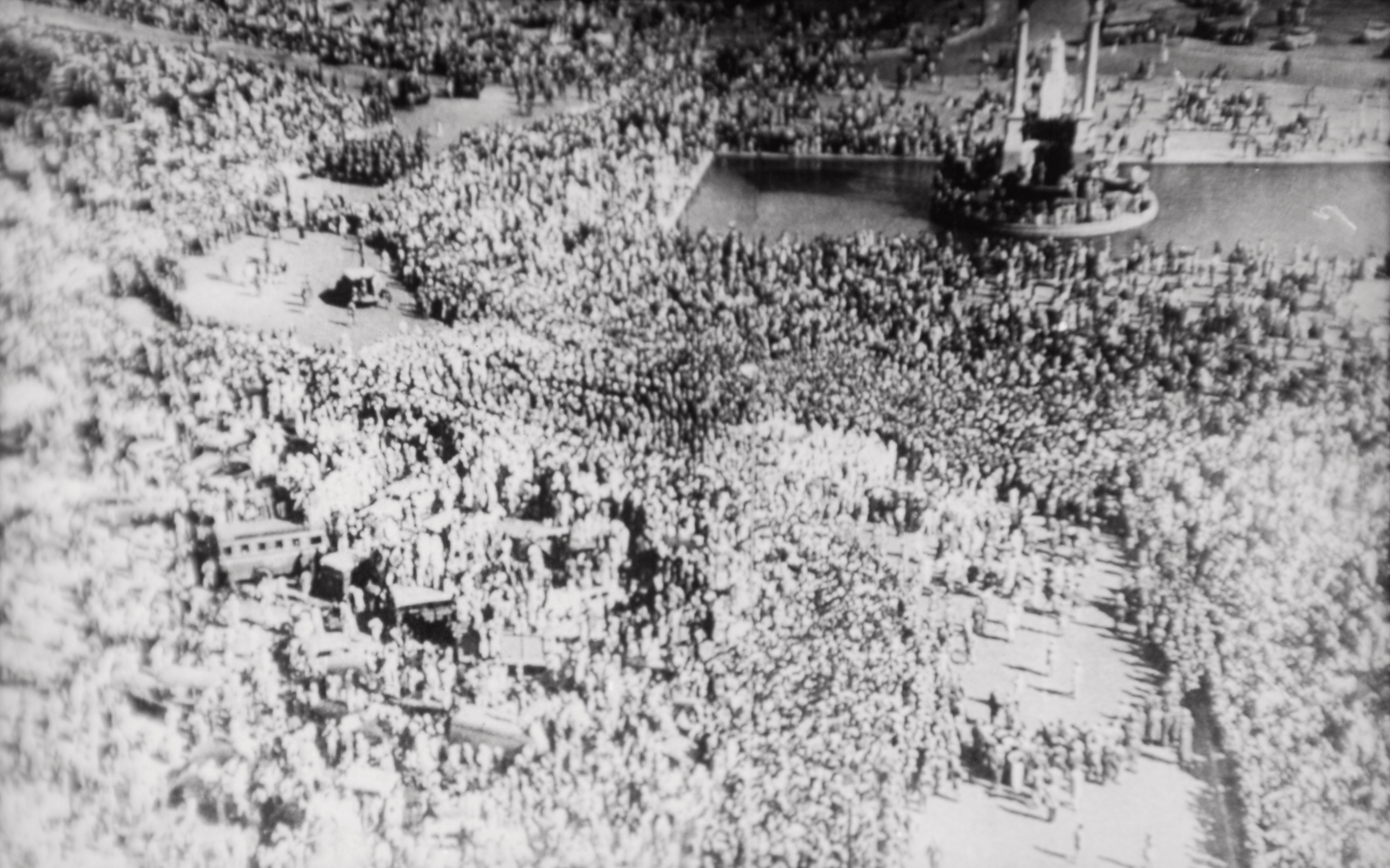
Gandhi's funeral was marked by millions of Indians.

Gandhi's death was mourned nationwide. Over a million people joined the five-mile-long funeral procession that took over five hours to reach Raj Ghat from Birla house, where Gandhi was assassinated, and another million watched the procession pass by. His body was transported on a weapons carrier, whose chassis was dismantled overnight to allow a high-floor to be installed so that people could catch a glimpse of Gandhi's body. The engine of the vehicle was not used; instead, four drag-ropes held by 50 people each pulled the vehicle. All Indian-owned establishments in London remained closed in mourning as thousands of people from all faiths and denominations and Indians from all over Britain converged at India House in London.

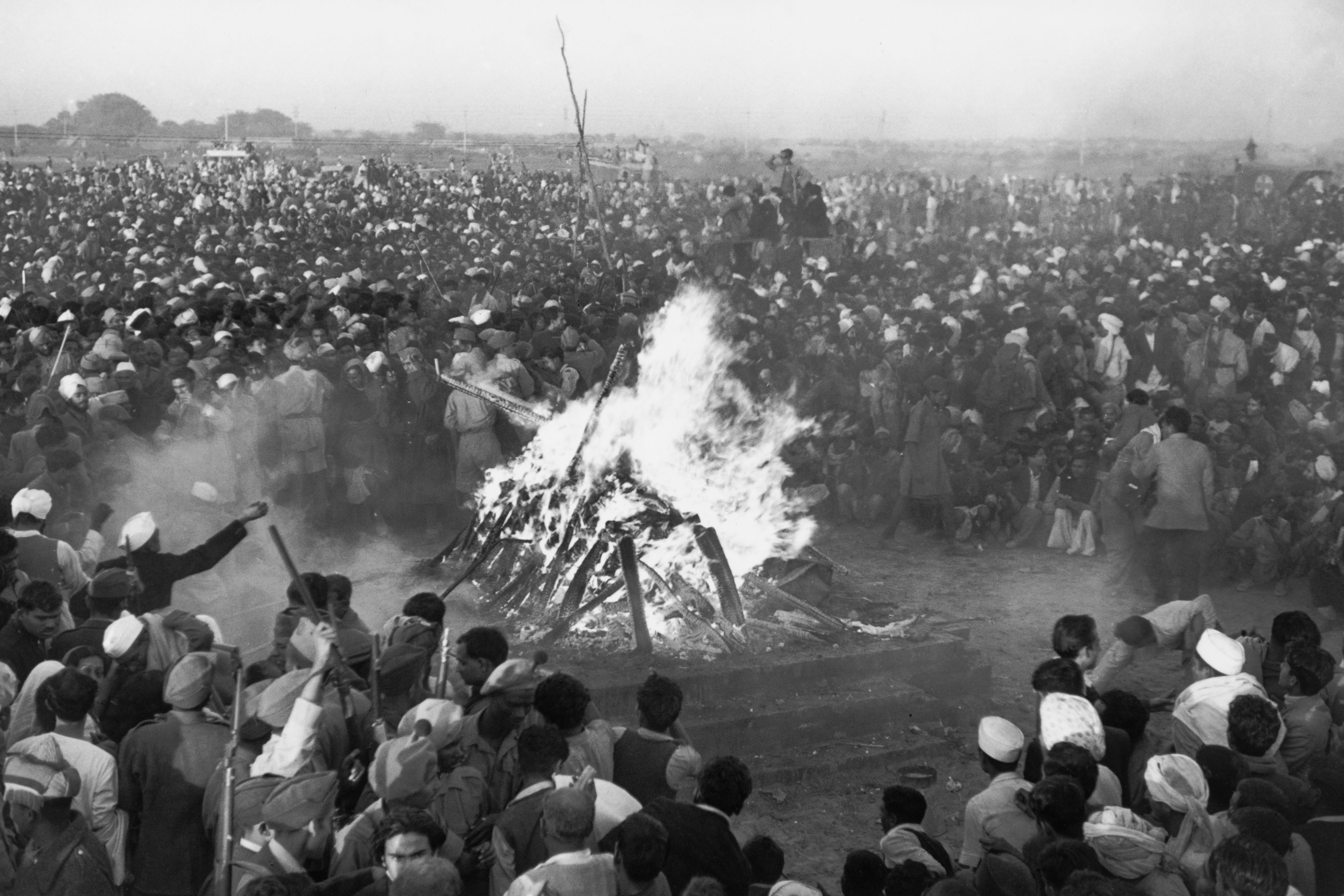
Cremation of Mahatma Gandhi at Rajghat, 31 January 1948. It was attended by Jawaharlal Nehru, Louis and Edwina Mountbatten, Maulana Azad, Rajkumari Amrit Kaur, Sarojini Naidu and other national leaders. His son Devdas Gandhi lit the pyre.

Gandhi was cremated in accordance with Hindu tradition. His ashes were poured into urns which were sent across India for memorial services. Most of the ashes were immersed at the Sangam at Allahabad on 12 February 1948, but some were secretly taken away. In 1997, Tushar Gandhi immersed the contents of one urn, found in a bank vault and reclaimed through the courts, at the Sangam at Allahabad. Some of Gandhi's ashes were scattered at the source of the Nile River near Jinja, Uganda, and a memorial plaque marks the event. On 30 January 2008, the contents of another urn were immersed at Girgaum Chowpatty. Another urn is at the palace of the Aga Khan in Pune (where Gandhi was held as a political prisoner from 1942 to 1944) and another in the Self-Realization Fellowship Lake Shrine in Los Angeles.

The Birla House site where Gandhi was assassinated is now a memorial called Gandhi Smriti. The place near Yamuna River where he was cremated is the Rāj Ghāt memorial in New Delhi. A black marble platform, it bears the epigraph "Hē Rāma" (Devanagari: हे ! राम or, Hey Raam). These are said to be Gandhi's last words after he was shot.

== Principles, practices, and beliefs ==
Gandhi's spirituality was greatly based on his embracement of the five great vows of Jainism and Hindu Yoga philosophy, viz. Satya (truth), ahimsa (nonviolence), brahmacharya (celibacy), asteya (non-stealing), and aparigraha (non-attachment). He stated that "Unless you impose on yourselves the five vows you may not embark on the experiment at all." Gandhi's statements, letters and life have attracted much political and scholarly analysis of his principles, practices and beliefs, including what influenced him. Some writers present Gandhi as a paragon of ethical living and pacifism, while others present him as a more complex, contradictory and evolving character influenced by his culture and circumstances.

=== Truth and Satyagraha ===
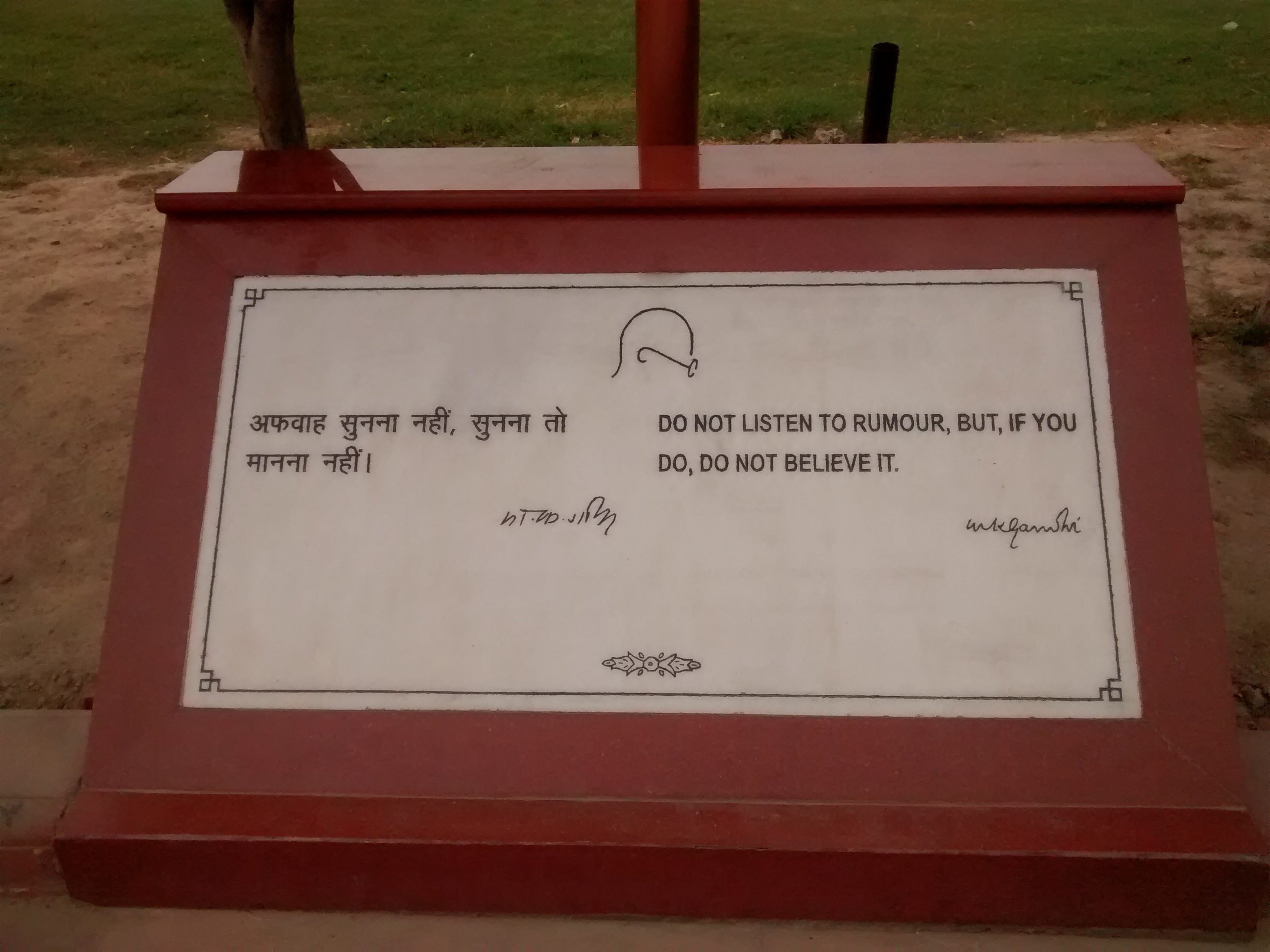
Plaque displaying one of Gandhi's quotes on rumour

Gandhi dedicated his life to discovering and pursuing truth, or Satya, and called his movement satyagraha, which means "appeal to, insistence on, or reliance on the Truth." The first formulation of the satyagraha as a political movement and principle occurred in 1920, which Gandhi tabled as "Resolution on Non-cooperation" in September that year before a session of the Indian Congress. It was the satyagraha formulation and step, states Dennis Dalton, that deeply resonated with beliefs and culture of his people, embedded him into the popular consciousness, transforming him quickly into Mahatma.

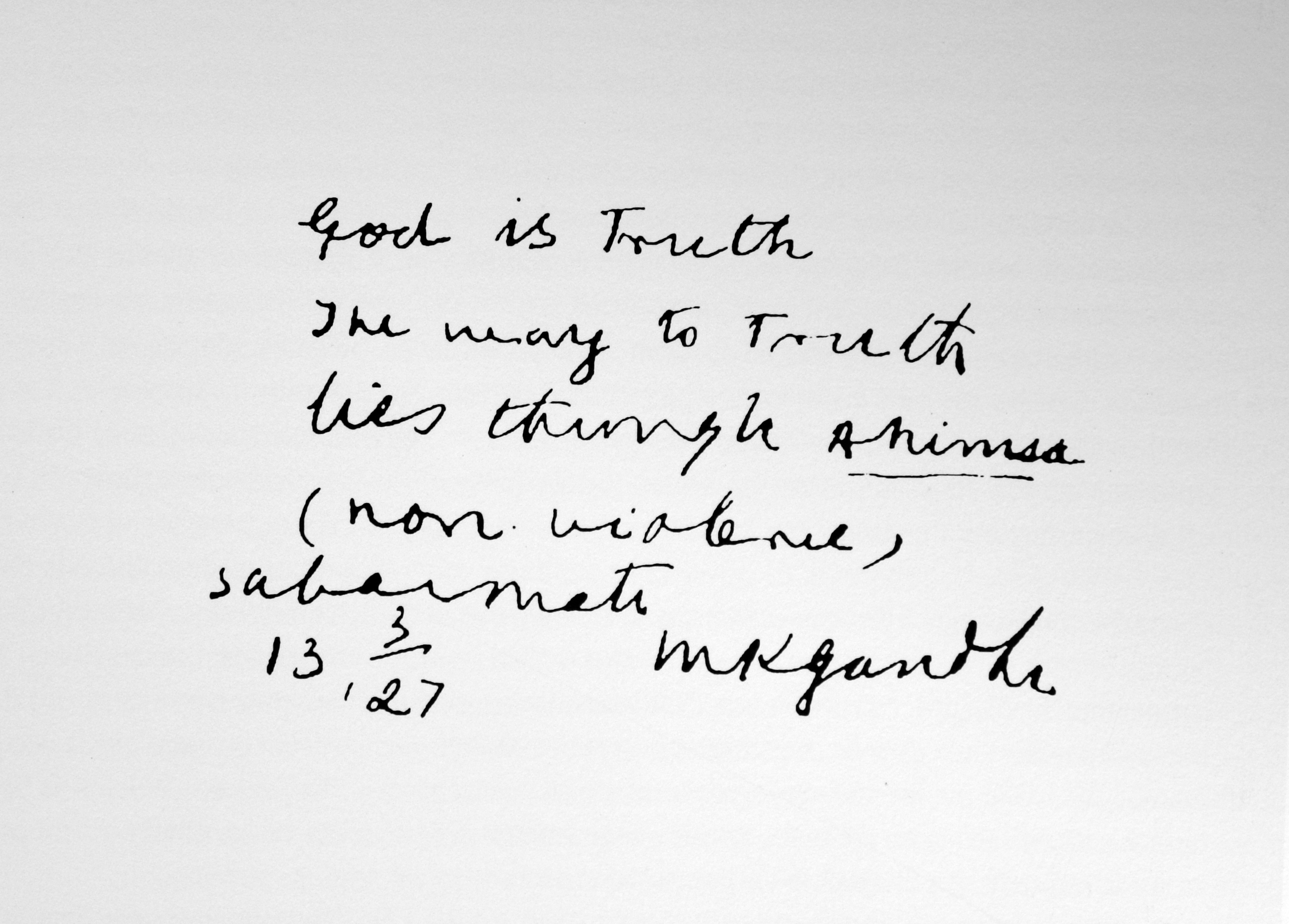
"God is Truth. The way to Truth lies through ahimsa (nonviolence)" – Sabarmati, 13 March 1927

Gandhi based Satyagraha on the Vedantic ideal of self-realisation, ahimsa (nonviolence), vegetarianism, and universal love. William Borman states that the key to his satyagraha is rooted in the Hindu Upanishadic texts. According to Indira Carr, Gandhi's ideas on ahimsa and satyagraha were founded on the philosophical foundations of Advaita Vedanta. I. Bruce Watson states that some of these ideas are found not only in traditions within Hinduism, but also in Jainism or Buddhism, particularly those about non-violence, vegetarianism and universal love, but Gandhi's synthesis was to politicise these ideas. His concept of satya as a civil movement, states Glyn Richards, are best understood in the context of the Hindu terminology of Dharma and Ṛta.

Gandhi stated that the most important battle to fight was overcoming his own demons, fears, and insecurities. Gandhi summarised his beliefs first when he said, "God is Truth." Gandhi would later change this statement to "Truth is God." Thus, satya (truth) in Gandhi's philosophy is "God". Gandhi, states Richards, described the term "God" not as a separate power, but as the Being (Brahman, Atman) of the Advaita Vedanta tradition, a nondual universal that pervades in all things, in each person and all life. According to Nicholas Gier, this to Gandhi meant the unity of God and humans, that all beings have the same one soul and therefore equality, that atman exists and is same as everything in the universe, ahimsa (non-violence) is the very nature of this atman.

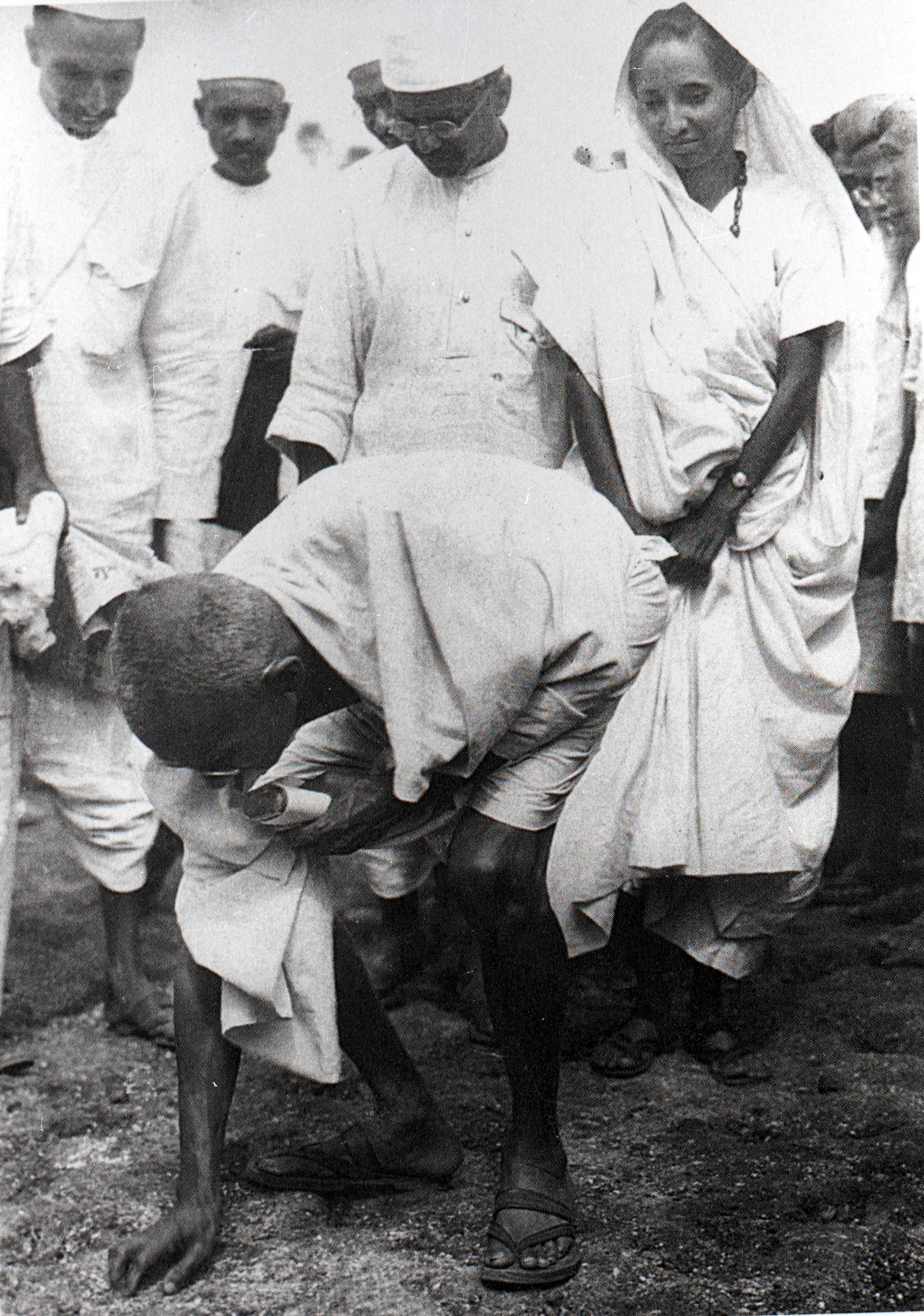
Gandhi picking salt during Salt Satyagraha to defy colonial law giving salt collection monopoly to the British. His satyagraha attracted vast numbers of Indian men and women.

The essence of Satyagraha is "soul force" as a political means, refusing to use brute force against the oppressor, seeking to eliminate antagonisms between the oppressor and the oppressed, aiming to transform or "purify" the oppressor. It is not inaction but determined passive resistance and non-co-operation where, states Arthur Herman, "love conquers hate". A euphemism sometimes used for Satyagraha is that it is a "silent force" or a "soul force" (a term also used by Martin Luther King Jr. during his "I Have a Dream" speech). It arms the individual with moral power rather than physical power. Satyagraha is also termed a "universal force", as it essentially "makes no distinction between kinsmen and strangers, young and old, man and woman, friend and foe."

Gandhi wrote: "There must be no impatience, no barbarity, no insolence, no undue pressure. If we want to cultivate a true spirit of democracy, we cannot afford to be intolerant. Intolerance betrays want of faith in one's cause." Civil disobedience and non-co-operation as practised under Satyagraha are based on the "law of suffering", a doctrine that the endurance of suffering is a means to an end. This end usually implies a moral upliftment or progress of an individual or society. Therefore, non-co-operation in Satyagraha is in fact a means to secure the co-operation of the opponent consistently with truth and justice.

While Gandhi's idea of satyagraha as a political means attracted a widespread following among Indians, the support was not universal. For example, Muslim leaders such as Jinnah opposed the satyagraha idea, accused Gandhi to be reviving Hinduism through political activism, and began effort to counter Gandhi with Muslim nationalism and a demand for Muslim homeland. The untouchability leader Ambedkar, in June 1945, after his decision to convert to Buddhism and the first Law and Justice minister of modern India, dismissed Gandhi's ideas as loved by "blind Hindu devotees", primitive, influenced by spurious brew of Tolstoy and Ruskin, and "there is always some simpleton to preach them". Winston Churchill caricatured Gandhi as a "cunning huckster" seeking selfish gain, an "aspiring dictator", and an "atavistic spokesman of a pagan Hinduism." Churchill stated that the civil disobedience movement spectacle of Gandhi only increased "the danger to which white people there [British India] are exposed."

=== Nonviolence ===
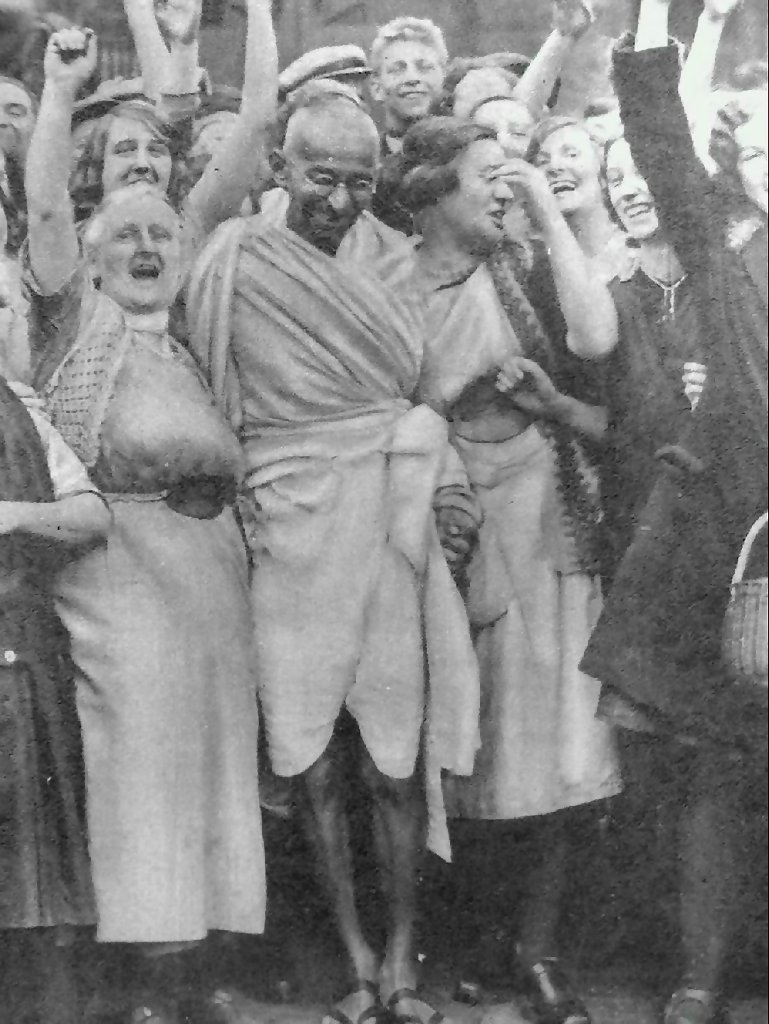
Gandhi with textile workers at Darwen, Lancashire, 26 September 1931

Although Gandhi was not the originator of the principle of nonviolence, he was the first to apply it in the political field on a large scale. The concept of nonviolence (ahimsa) has a long history in Indian religious thought, and is considered the highest dharma (ethical value/virtue), a precept to be observed towards all living beings (sarvbhuta), at all times (sarvada), in all respects (sarvatha), in action, words and thought. Gandhi explains his philosophy and ideas about ahimsa as a political means in his autobiography The Story of My Experiments with Truth. Gandhi believed that violence is not a suitable option when it comes to bringing a change to society but it has to be done with a disciplined and value oriented strategy in form of non-violence. In this regard, he wrote in 1942:

"The revolutionaries are at liberty to reject the whole of my philosophy. To them I merely present my own experiences as a co-worker in the same cause even as I have successfully presented them to the Ali Brothers and many other friends. They can and do applaud whole-heartedly the action of Mustafa Kamal Pasha and possibly De Valera and Lenin. But they realise with me that India is not like Turkey or Ireland or Russia, and that revolutionary activity is suicidal at this stage of the country's life at any rate if not for all time, in a country so vast, so hopelessly divided and with the masses so deeply sunk in pauperism and so fearfully terror-struck."

Although Gandhi considered non-violence to be "infinitely superior to violence", he preferred violence to cowardice. Gandhi added that he "would rather have India resort to arms in order to defend her honor than that she should in a cowardly manner become or remain a helpless witness to her own dishonor."

=== Brahmacharya: abstinence from sex and food ===
Along with many other texts, Gandhi studied the Bhagavad Gita while in South Africa. This Hindu scripture discusses jnana yoga, bhakti yoga and karma yoga along with virtues such as non-violence, patience, integrity, lack of hypocrisy, self restraint and abstinence. Gandhi began experiments with these, and in 1906 at age 37, although married and a father, he vowed to abstain from sexual relations.

Gandhi's experiment with abstinence went beyond sex, and extended to food. He consulted the Jain scholar Rajchandra, whom he fondly called Raychandbhai. Rajchandra advised him that milk stimulated sexual passion. Gandhi began abstaining from cow's milk in 1912, and did so even when doctors advised him to consume milk. According to Sankar Ghose, Tagore described Gandhi as someone who did not abhor sex or women, but considered sexual life as inconsistent with his moral goals.

Gandhi tested his brahmacharya (celibacy) by carrying out experiments some time after the death of his wife in February 1944. At the start of his experiment, he had women sleep in the same room but in different beds. He later slept with women in the same bed, often naked. In April 1945, Gandhi referenced being sleeping with several "women or girls" in a letter to Birla as part of the experiments. According to the 1960s memoir of his grandniece Manu, Gandhi feared in early 1947 that he and she may be killed by Muslims in the run-up to India's independence in August 1947, and asked her when she was 18 years old if she wanted to help him with his experiments to test their "purity", for which she readily accepted. Gandhi also shared his bed with 18-year-old Abha, wife of his grandnephew Kanu. Gandhi would sleep with both Manu and Abha at the same time. Gandhi believed that celibacy is of no value if it hasnt been tested. He stated:

"I want to test, enlarge and revise the current definition of brahmacharya, by which you swear, in the light of my observation, study and experience. Therefore, whenever an opportunity presents itself I do not evade it or run away from it. On the contrary, I deem it my duty - dharma - to meet it squarely in the face and find out where it leads to and where I stand. To avoid the contact of a woman or to run away from it out of fear, I regard as unbecoming of an aspirant after true brahmacharya."

According to Sean Scalmer, Gandhi in his final year of life was an ascetic, and his sickly skeletal figure was caricatured in Western media. In February 1947, he asked his confidants such as Birla and Ramakrishna if it was wrong for him to experiment his brahmacharya oath. Gandhi's public experiments, as they progressed, were widely discussed and criticised by his family members and leading politicians. However, Gandhi said that if he would not let woman sleep with him, it would be a sign of weakness. Some of his staff resigned, including two of his newspaper's editors who had refused to print some of Gandhi's sermons dealing with his experiments. Veena Howard states Gandhi's views on brahmacharya and religious renunciation experiments were a method to confront women issues in his times. Psychologist Sudhir Kakar views these experiments "wherein the aged Mahatma pathetically sought to reassure himself of the strength of his celibacy".

Gandhi also supported alcohol abstinence, advocating Prohibition as the only effective way to deal with alcohol usage.

== Literary works ==
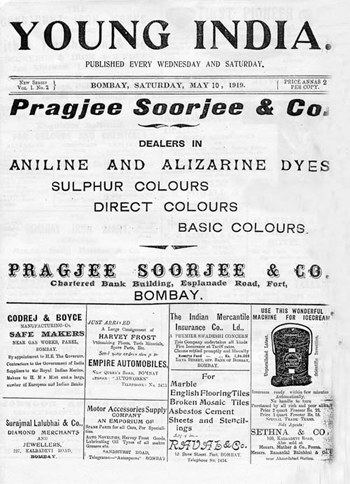
Young India, a weekly journal published by Gandhi from 1919 to 1932

Gandhi was a prolific writer. His signature style was simple, precise, clear and devoid of artificialities. One of Gandhi's earliest publications, Hind Swaraj, published in Gujarati in 1909, became "the intellectual blueprint" for India's independence movement. The book was translated into English the next year, with a copyright legend that read "No Rights Reserved". For decades, Gandhi edited several newspapers including Harijan in Gujarati, in Hindi and in the English language; Indian Opinion while in South Africa and, Young India, in English, and Navajivan, a Gujarati monthly, on his return to India. Later, Navajivan was also published in Hindi. Gandhi also wrote letters almost every day to individuals and newspapers.

Gandhi also wrote several books, including his autobiography, The Story of My Experiments with Truth (Gujarati: સત્યના પ્રયોગો અથવા આત્મકથા), of which Gandhi bought the entire first edition to make sure it was reprinted. His other autobiographies included: Satyagraha in South Africa about his struggle there, Hind Swaraj or Indian Home Rule, a political pamphlet, and a paraphrase in Gujarati of John Ruskin's Unto This Last which was an early critique of political economy. This last essay can be considered his programme on economics. Gandhi also wrote extensively on vegetarianism, diet and health, religion, social reforms, etc. Gandhi usually wrote in Gujarati, though he also revised the Hindi and English translations of his books. In 1934, Gandhi wrote Songs from Prison while prisoned in Yerawada jail in Maharashtra.

Gandhi's complete works were published by the Indian government under the name The Collected Works of Mahatma Gandhi in the 1960s. The writings comprise about 50,000 pages published in about 100 volumes. In 2000, a revised edition of the complete works sparked a controversy, as it contained a large number of errors and omissions. The Indian government later withdrew the revised edition.

In August 2026, a collection of handwritten notes by Gandhi, reported to be rare were auctioned in Mumbai for USD 1.69 Million. The notes addressed issues on truth, non-violence and self-restraint. The auction house is quoted as stating that the auction price is the highest paid for any Indian historical document.

== Legacy and artistic depictions ==
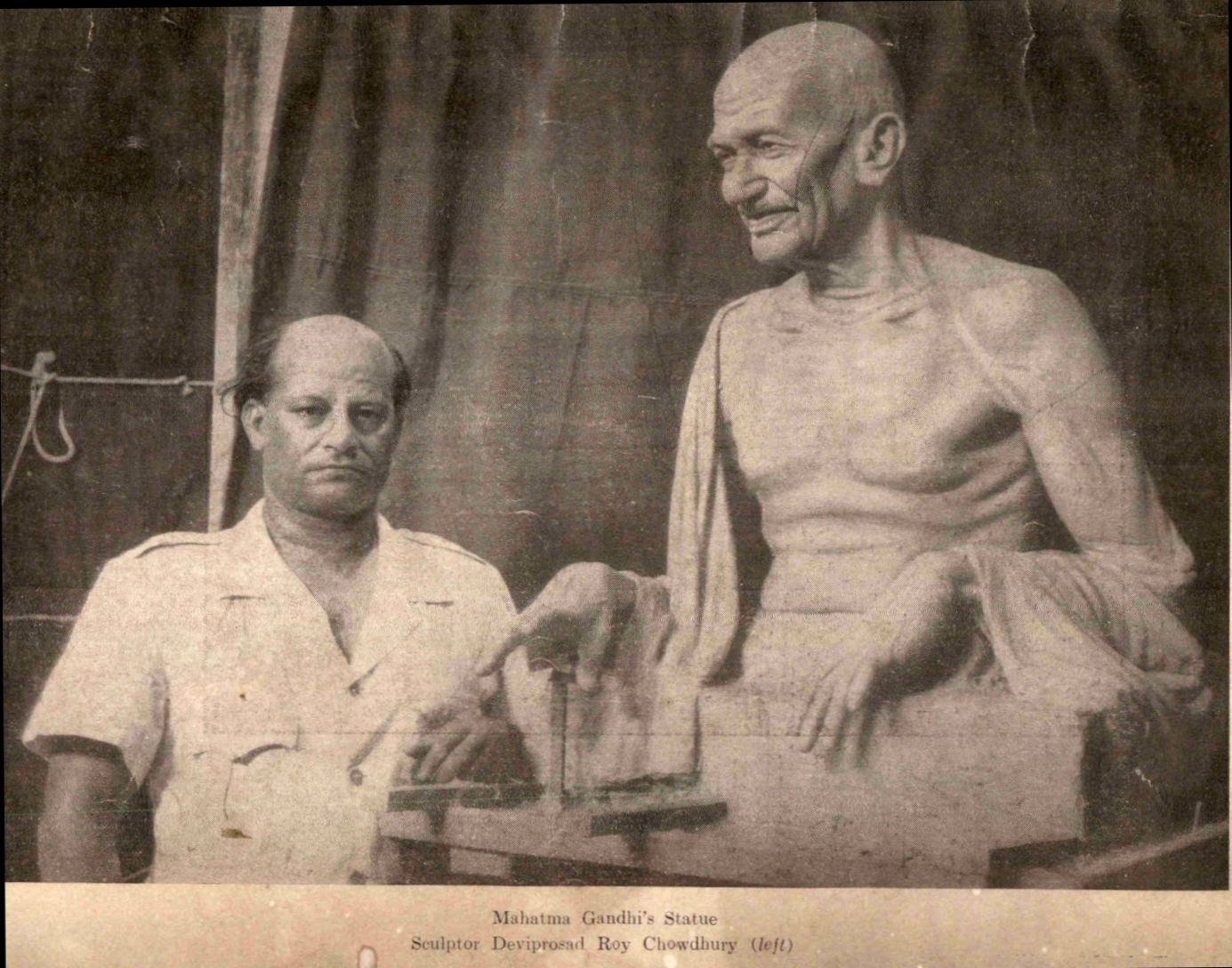
Indian sculptor Devi Prasad Roy Choudhury with his sculpture of Gandhi

Gandhi is noted as the greatest figure of the successful Indian independence movement against the British rule. He is also hailed as the greatest figure of modern India. Accordingly he has left a substantial cultural legacy, including one of three national holidays celebrated in India, Gandhi Jayanti.

There are also several Gandhi-Prizes to award peace activicts in the spirit of Mahatma Gandhi:

- Gandhi Peace Prize by Government of India
- Gandhi International Peace Award by Gandhi Foundation (London)
- Gandhi Peace Award by Promoting Enduring Peace

== See also ==
- Abdul Ghaffar Khan – Indian independence activist (1890–1988)
- Composite nationalism – Concept about India as a nation
- Gandhi cap – White sidecap, pointed in front and back and having a wide band, worn in India
- Gandhi Teerth – Gandhi International Research Institute and Museum for Gandhian study, research on Mahatma Gandhi and dialogue
- Gandhian socialism
- Gandhi's legacy
- Inclusive Christianity
- List of civil rights leaders
- List of peace activists
- NCERT textbook controversies – Rationalisation on topics related to Gandhi
- Seven Social Sins – Mohandas Gandhi's list of negative qualities
- Trikaranasuddhi

== General and cited references ==
Books

- Ahmed, Talat (2018). Mohandas Gandhi: Experiments in Civil Disobedience. ISBN 0-7453-3429-6.
- Barr, F. Mary (1956). Bapu: Conversations and Correspondence with Mahatma Gandhi (2nd ed.). Bombay: International Book House. OCLC 8372568. (see book article)
- Bondurant, Joan Valérie (1971). Conquest of Violence: the Gandhian philosophy of conflict. University of California Press.
- Borman, William (1986). Gandhi and Non-Violence. State University of New York Press. ISBN 978-0-88706-331-2.
- Brown, Judith Margaret (1991). Gandhi: Prisoner of Hope. Yale University Press. ISBN 978-0-300-05125-4.
- Brown, Judith M. (2004). "Gandhi, Mohandas Karamchand [Mahatma Gandhi] (1869–1948)", Oxford Dictionary of National Biography, Oxford University Press.
- Brown, Judith M., and Anthony Parel, eds. (2012). The Cambridge Companion to Gandhi; 14 essays by scholars.
- Chadha, Yogesh (1997). Gandhi: a life. John Wiley. ISBN 978-0-471-24378-6.
- Dwivedi, Divya; Mohan, Shaj; Nancy, Jean-Luc (2019). Gandhi and Philosophy: On Theological Anti-politics. Bloomsbury Academic, UK. ISBN 978-1-4742-2173-3.
- Dalton, Dennis (2012). Mahatma Gandhi: Nonviolent Power in Action. Columbia University Press. ISBN 978-0-231-15959-3.
- Dalton, Dennis (2012a). Mahatma Gandhi: Nonviolent Power in Action. Columbia University Press. ISBN 978-0-231-53039-2.
- Dhiman, S. (2016). Gandhi and Leadership: New Horizons in Exemplary Leadership. Springer. ISBN 978-1-137-49235-7.
- Easwaran, Eknath (2011). Gandhi the Man: How One Man Changed Himself to Change the World. Nilgiri Press. ISBN 978-1-58638-055-7.
- Hook, Sue Vander (2010). Mahatma Gandhi: Proponent of Peace. ABDO. ISBN 978-1-61758-813-6.
- Gandhi, Rajmohan (1990). Patel, A Life. Navajivan Pub. House.
- Gandhi, Rajmohan (2007a). Mohandas: A True Story of a Man, His People, and an Empire. Penguin Books. ISBN 978-0-14-310411-7.
- Gandhi, Rajmohan (2007b). Mohandas: True Story of a Man, His People, and an Empire. Penguin Books. ISBN 978-81-8475-317-2.
- Gandhi, Rajmohan (2008). Gandhi: The Man, His People, and the Empire. University of California Press. ISBN 978-0-520-25570-8.
- Gangrade, K.D. (2004). "Role of Shanti Sainiks in the Global Race for Armaments". Moral Lessons From Gandhi's Autobiography And Other Essays. Concept Publishing Company. ISBN 978-81-8069-084-6.
- Ghose, Sankar (1991). Mahatma Gandhi. Allied Publishers. ISBN 978-81-7023-205-6.
- Guha, Ramachandra (2013). Gandhi Before India. Vintage Books. ISBN 978-0-385-53230-3.
- Guha, Ramachandra (2013a). Gandhi Before India. Allen Lane. ISBN 978-0-670-08387-9.
- Guha, Ramachandra (2013x). Gandhi Before India. Penguin Books Limited. ISBN 978-93-5118-322-8.
- Guha, Ramachandra (15 October 2014a). Gandhi before India. Penguin Books Limited. ISBN 978-93-5118-322-8. Archived from the original on 29 March 2024.
- Guha, Ramachandra (2015). Gandhi before India. Vintage Books. ISBN 978-0-385-53230-3.
- Hardiman, David (2003). Gandhi in His Time and Ours: the global legacy of his ideas. C. Hurst & Co. ISBN 978-1-85065-711-8.
- Hardiman, David (2003a). Gandhi in His Time and Ours: The Global Legacy of His Ideas. Columbia University Press. ISBN 978-0-231-13114-8. Archived from the original on 29 March 2024.
- Hatt, Christine (2002). Mahatma Gandhi. Evans Brothers. ISBN 978-0-237-52308-4.
- Herman, Arthur (2008). Gandhi & Churchill: The Epic Rivalry that Destroyed an Empire and Forged Our Age. Random House Publishing Group. ISBN 978-0-553-90504-5. Ebook: ISBN 978-0-553-80463-8.
- Jai, Janak Raj (1996). Commissions and Omissions by Indian Prime Ministers: 1947–1980. Regency Publications. ISBN 978-81-86030-23-3.
- Majmudar, Uma (2005). Gandhi's Pilgrimage of Faith: from darkness to light. SUNY Press. ISBN 978-0-7914-6405-2.
- Markovits, Claude, ed. (2002). A History of Modern India, 1480–1950. Anthem Press. ISBN 978-1-84331-004-4.
- McDermott, Rachel Fell; Gordon, Leonard A.; Embree, Ainslie T.; Pritchett, Frances W.; Dalton, Dennis, eds. (2014). Sources of Indian Traditions, Volume 2: Modern India, Pakistan, and Bangladesh (3rd ed.). New York: Columbia University Press. ISBN 978-0-231-13830-7.
- Miller, Jake C. (2002). Prophets of a just society. Nova Publishers. ISBN 978-1-59033-068-5.
- Minault, Gail (1982). The Khilafat Movement Religious Symbolism and Political Mobilization in India. Columbia University Press. ISBN 0-231-05072-0.
- Muldoon, Andrew (2016). Empire, Politics and the Creation of the 1935 India Act: Last Act of the Raj. Routledge. ISBN 978-1-317-14431-1.
- Pāṇḍeya, Viśva Mohana (2003). Historiography of India's Partition: an analysis of imperialist writings. Atlantic Publishers & Dist. ISBN 978-81-269-0314-6.
- Pilisuk, Marc; Nagler, Michael N. (2011). Peace Movements Worldwide: Players and practices in resistance to war. ABC-CLIO. ISBN 978-0-313-36482-2.
- Rühe, Peter (2004). Gandhi. Phaidon. ISBN 978-0-7148-4459-6.
- Schouten, Jan Peter (2008). Jesus as Guru: the image of Christ among Hindus and Christians in India. Rodopi. ISBN 978-90-420-2443-4.
- Sharp, Gene (1979). Gandhi as a Political Strategist: with essays on ethics and politics. P. Sargent Publishers. ISBN 978-0-87558-090-6.
- Shashi, S. S. (1996). Encyclopaedia Indica: India, Pakistan, Bangladesh. Anmol Publications. ISBN 978-81-7041-859-7.
- Sinha, Satya (2015). The Dialectic of God: The Theosophical Views Of Tagore and Gandhi. Partridge Publishing India. ISBN 978-1-4828-4748-2.
- Sofri, Gianni (1999). Gandhi and India: a century in focus. Windrush Press. ISBN 978-1-900624-12-1.
- Thacker, Dhirubhai (2006). "Gandhi, Mohandas Karamchand". In Amaresh Datta (ed.). The Encyclopaedia of Indian Literature (Volume Two) (Devraj To Jyoti). Sahitya Akademi. p. 1345. ISBN 978-81-260-1194-0.
- Todd, Anne M. (2004). Mohandas Gandhi. Infobase Publishing. ISBN 978-0-7910-7864-8.; short biography for children
- Todd, Anne M. (2009). Mohandas Gandhi. Infobase Publishing. ISBN 978-1-4381-0662-5.
- Wolpert, Stanley (2001). Gandhi's Passion: The Life and Legacy of Mahatma Gandhi. Oxford University Press. ISBN 978-0-19-515634-8. Archived from the original on 21 July 2023.
- Wolpert, Stanley (2001a). "Midnight in Calcutta". Gandhi's Passion: The life and legacy of Mahatma Gandhi. Oxford University Press. ISBN 0-19-515634-X. Archived from the original on 21 March 2016.
- Wolpert, Stanley (2002). Gandhi's Passion: the life and legacy of Mahatma Gandhi. Oxford University Press. ISBN 978-0-19-972872-5.
- Wolpert, Stanley (2002a). Gandhi's Passion: The Life and Legacy of Mahatma Gandhi. Oxford University Press. ISBN 978-0-19-515634-8. Archived from the original on 19 February 2017.
- Wolpert, Stanley (2004). A New History of India (7th ed.). New York: Oxford University Press. ISBN 0195166787.
- Wolpert, Stanley (2009). Shameful Flight: The Last Years of the British Empire in India. Oxford University Press. ISBN 978-0-19-539394-1. Archived from the original on 1 October 2013.

Scholarly articles

- Danielson, Leilah C. "'In My Extremity I Turned to Gandhi': American Pacifists, Christianity, and Gandhian Nonviolence, 1915–1941". Church History 72.2 (2003): 361–388.
- Du Toit, Brian M. "The Mahatma Gandhi and South Africa." Journal of Modern African Studies 34#4 (1996): 643–660. JSTOR 161593.
- Gokhale, B. G. "Gandhi and the British Empire", History Today (Nov 1969), 19#11 pp 744–751 online.
- Juergensmeyer, Mark. "The Gandhi Revival – A Review Article." The Journal of Asian Studies 43#2 (Feb. 1984), pp. 293–298. JSTOR 2055315
- Khosla, G.D. (1965). The Murder of the Mahatma (proceedings by the Chief Justice of Punjab) (PDF). Jaico Publishers. Archived from the original (PDF) on 21 September 2015.
- Kishwar, Madhu. "Gandhi on Women." Economic and Political Weekly 20, no. 41 (1985): 1753–758. JSTOR 4374920.
- Mohammed, Fevin "Gandhi the Great". (2013) (PhD in Historical Research, Coordinated under Prof. Ram Prasad Sharma).
- Murthy, C. S. H. N., Oinam Bedajit Meitei, and Dapkupar Tariang. "The Tale Of Gandhi Through The Lens: An Inter-Textual Analytical Study Of Three Major Films-Gandhi, The Making Of The Mahatma, And Gandhi, My Father." CINEJ Cinema Journal 2.2 (2013): 4–37. online
- Power, Paul F. "Toward a Revaluation of Gandhi's Political Thought." Western Political Quarterly 16.1 (1963): 99–108 excerpt.
- Rudolph, Lloyd I. "Gandhi in the Mind of America." Economic and Political Weekly 45, no. 47 (2010): 23–26. JSTOR 25764146.

Primary sources

- Abel M (2005). Glimpses of Indian National Movement. ICFAI Books. ISBN 978-81-7881-420-9.
- Andrews, C. F. (2008) [1930]. "VII – The Teaching of Ahimsa". Mahatma Gandhi's Ideas Including Selections from His Writings. Pierides Press. ISBN 978-1-4437-3309-0.
- Dalton, Dennis, ed. (1996). Mahatma Gandhi: Selected Political Writings. Hackett Publishing. ISBN 978-0-87220-330-3.
- Duncan, Ronald, ed. (2011). Selected Writings of Mahatma Gandhi. Literary Licensing, LLC. ISBN 978-1-258-00907-6. Archived from the original on 1 October 2020 – via Questia.
- Gandhi, Mohandas Karamchand (1928). Satyagraha in South Africa (in Gujarati). Translated by Valji G. Desai (1st ed.). Ahmedabad: Navajivan Publishing House.
- Gandhi, Mohandas Karamchand (1994). The Collected Works of Mahatma Gandhi. Publications Division, Ministry of Information and Broadcasting, Govt. of India. ISBN 978-81-230-0239-2. (100 volumes). Free online access from Gandhiserve.
- Gandhi, Mohandas Karamchand (1928). "Drain Inspector's Report". The United States of India. 5 (6–8): 3–4.
- Gandhi, Mohandas Karamchand (1990a). Desai, Mahadev H. (ed.). Autobiography: The Story of My Experiments With Truth. Mineola, N.Y.: Dover. ISBN 0-486-24593-4.
- Gandhi, Mohandas Karamchand (2002). Fischer, Louis (ed.). The Essential Gandhi: An Anthology of His Writings on His Life, Work and Ideas (2nd ed.). Vintage Books. ISBN 978-1-4000-3050-7.
- Jack, Homer A., ed. (1994). The Gandhi Reader: A Source Book of His Life and Writings. Grove Press. ISBN 978-0-8021-3161-4.
- Johnson, Richard L., ed. (2006). Gandhi's Experiments with Truth: Essential Writings by and about Mahatma Gandhi. Lexington Books. ISBN 978-0-7391-1143-7.
- Parel, Anthony J., ed. (2009). Gandhi: "Hind Swaraj" and Other Writings Centenary Edition. Cambridge University Press. ISBN 978-0-521-14602-9.
