= Gandhi (surname) =

Gandhi is a Punjabi Arora-Khatri surname and separately a Gujarati Modh-Bania surname. The two communities are not linked.

Gandhi may also refer to:

== Family of Mahatma Gandhi ==
- Mohandas Karamchand Gandhi (1869–1948), known as the Mahatma.
- Kasturba Gandhi (1869–1944), wife
- Harilal Gandhi (1888–1948), eldest son
- Manilal Gandhi (1891–1956), second son
  - Ela Gandhi (born 1940), South African politician
  - Arun Gandhi (1934–2023), head of M. K. Gandhi Institute for Non-violence
    - Tushar Gandhi (born 1960), Indian politician and peace activist
- Ramdas Gandhi (1897–1969), third son
- Devdas Gandhi (1900–1957), youngest son
  - Rajmohan Gandhi (born 1935), biographer
  - Gopalkrishna Gandhi (born 1945), Indian administrator, former Governor of West Bengal and Bihar
  - Ramchandra Gandhi (1937–2007), Indian philosopher
    - Leela Gandhi (born 1966), postcolonial theorist
- Samaldas Gandhi (1897–1953), cousin who led the Arzi Hukumat during the Junagadh crisis

== Family of Feroze Gandhi and Indira Gandhi ==
- Feroze Gandhi (1912–1960), husband of Indira Gandhi
- Indira Gandhi (1917–1984), daughter of Jawaharlal Nehru and wife of Feroze Gandhi; former Prime Minister of India (1966–1977; 1980–1984)
  - Rajiv Gandhi (1944–1991), son of Feroze & Indira Gandhi; former Prime Minister of India (1984–1989)
  - Sonia Gandhi (born 1946), widow of Rajiv Gandhi; leader of the INC party (1998–2017, 2019–present)
    - Rahul Gandhi (born 1970), son of Sonia Gandhi & Rajiv Gandhi; leader of the INC party (2017–2019)
    - Priyanka Gandhi Vadra (born 1971), daughter of Sonia Gandhi & Rajiv Gandhi.
  - Sanjay Gandhi (1946–1980), son of Feroze & Indira Gandhi
  - Maneka Gandhi (born 1956), widow of Sanjay Gandhi
    - Varun Gandhi (born 1980), son of Sanjay & Maneka Gandhi

== Other notable people ==
- Anand Gandhi (born 1980), an Indian filmmaker
- Bhogilal Gandhi (1911–2001), Indian writer and independence activist from Gujarat
- Devang Gandhi (born 1971), an Indian cricketer
- Dharamvir Gandhi (born 1951), an Indian politician and physician
- James Gandhi (born 1993), British actor, producer and writer
- Jonita Gandhi (born 1989), Canadian playback singer
- Kancheepuram (Kanchi) Natarajan Gandhi (born 1948), senior nomenclature registrar and bibliographer at Harvard University
- Kiran Gandhi (born 1989), a musician who also performs as "Madame Gandhi"
- Lalit Mohan Gandhi (1952–2016), an Indian Nation Congress politician, minister of planning and coordination
- Meera Gandhi (born 1963), founder of The Giving Back Foundation
- Nari Gandhi (1934–1993), an Indian architect
- Nikhita Gandhi (born 1991), Indian playback singer
- Pooja Gandhi (born 1983), a Kannada film actress
- Pratik Gandhi (born 1989), a Gujarati / Hindi actor
- Bhavya Gandhi (born 1997), an Indian actor
- Rustom K. S. Ghandhi (1924–2014), an Indian Navy Admiral
- Shanta Gandhi (1917–2002), theatre director and playwright
- Sorab K. Ghandhi (1928–2018), Professor Emeritus in Electrical Engineering at Rensselaer Polytechnic Institute
- Virchand Gandhi (1864–1901), Jain representative at the first World Parliament of Religions in Chicago, 1893

== See also ==
- Gandhi (disambiguation)
- Gandy (surname)
- Ghandy (surname)
