= Kanu Gandhi (scientist) =

Indian scientist

- Born: 1928
- Died: 7 November 2016 (aged 87–88); Surat, Gujarat, India
- Education: MIT
- Parents: Ramdas Gandhi (father); Nirmala Gandhi (mother)
- Relatives: Putlibai Gandhi (great-grandmother); Karamchand Gandhi (great-grandfather); Mahatma Gandhi (grandfather); Kasturba Gandhi (grandmother)
- Family: Family of Mahatma Gandhi

Kanu Gandhi (1928 – 7 November 2016) was an Indian scientist and son of Ramdas Gandhi, and a grandson of Mahatma Gandhi.

He studied at Massachusetts Institute of Technology, graduating with a master's degree in civil engineering in 1963. Later he worked for NASA and United States Department of Defense on aircraft design.

== Personal life ==
In 1961, Kanu Gandhi married Shiva Lakshmi Thaker (also spelled Schiva) in 1961 at Worcester, MA. Shiva Lakshmi had studied at Miami University in Ohio earlier, and was reportedly studying at Clark University at the time of marriage and then at Boston University.

In 1963, Gandhi graduated from the Massachusetts Institute of Technology with a master's degree in civil engineering.

His wife Shivalaxmi was a professor and researcher at Boston Biomedical Research Institute. They had no children. In 2014 they moved back to India. He died in a private hospital in Surat two years later.

== Career ==
He worked for NASA and United States Department of Defense on aircraft design.
