= Putlibai =

Putlibai can refer to:

- Putlibai Gandhi (1844–1891), mother of Mahatma Gandhi
- Putlibai (dacoit) (1926/1929–1958), Indian female dacoit
