= Gandy (surname) =

Gandy is a surname. Notable persons with that surname include:

- Andrew Jackson Gandy (1924–1942), American naval seaman
- Antonio Gandy-Golden (born 1998), American football player
- Bruce Gandy (born 1962), Canadian bagpipe player
- Charles Gandy (1872–1943), French physician
- Christopher Henry Gandy (1867–1907), British cricketer
- David Gandy (born 1980), British model
- Dylan Gandy (born 1982), American football player
- Ellen Gandy (born 1991), British swimmer
- Evelyn Gandy (1920–2007), American politician from Mississippi
- George Gandy (1851–1946), American entrepreneur
- Harry Gandy (1881–1957), American politician from South Dakota
- Helen Gandy (1897–1988), American civil servant
- Ida Gandy (1885–1977), English social worker and author, mother of Robin
- James Gandy (1619–1689), British portrait painter
- John Manuel Gandy (1870–1947), American college president
- John Peter Gandy aka John Deering (1787–1850), British architect
- Joseph Edward Gandy (1847–1934), American politician from Washington
- Joseph Michael Gandy (1771–1843), British artist
- Kim Gandy (born 1954), American feminist activist
- Martha Gandy Fales (1930–2006), American art historian and curator
- Matthew Gandy (born 1965), British urbanist and geographer
- Michael Gandy (architect) (1778–1862), British architect
- Michael Gandy (cricketer) (born 1944), Australian cricketer
- Mike Gandy (born 1979), American football player
- Oscar H. Gandy Jr. (born c.1944), American communication studies academic
- Peter Gandy (born 1961), Australian athlete
- Peter Gandy (author), British writer on religious topics
- Phillip A. Gandy (born 1950), American politician from Mississippi
- Robert Brinkley 'Bob' Gandy (1893–1945), American baseball player
- Robin Gandy (1919–1995), British mathematical logician
- Sam Gandy, American professor researching amyloid
- Stephanie Gandy (born 1982), British American basketball player
- Tanya Gandy (born 1987), American water polo player
- Wayne Gandy (born 1971), American football player
- William Gandy (died 1729), British portrait painter

== See also ==
- Gandhi (surname)
- Gandy (disambiguation)
- Ghandy (surname)
