= Mahatma Gandhi Foundation =

Indian foundation

The Mahatma Gandhi Foundation is located in Gujarat, India and is headed by Tushar Gandhi, the great-grandson of Mahatma Gandhi and the son of nonviolent activist and organiser Arun Gandhi. The organisation under the leadership of Tushar, a socio-political activist of peace issues, is involved in advocating and spreading Gandhian values and principles to address the problems and dilemmas faced by humankind and the contemporary world.

In 2006, Tushar Gandhi was appointed as a Goodwill Ambassador of CISRI-ISP Intergovernmental Institution for the use of Micro-algae Spirulina Against Malnutrition.

The Gandhi Foundation is a foundation which is dedicated entirely to Mohandas Karamchand Gandhi and his works to free India from British rule. It has an office in Kingsley Hall Community Centre in east London where Gandhi stayed in 1931.

This organisation was founded in 1983 by Surur Hoda.
