= Kanu Gandhi =

Indian photographer

- Born: 1917
- Died: 20 February 1986 (aged 68–69)
- Family: Gandhi family

Kanu Gandhi (1917 – 20 February 1986) was an Indian photographer. He was a grandnephew of Mahatma Gandhi who lived with him in several of his ashrams and was a member of his personal staff. He is best remembered as Gandhi's photographer, recording many moments of Gandhi's life on film from 1938 until his assassination in 1948. Following Gandhi's death, Kanu and his wife Abha moved to Rajkot where they ran a rural centre named after Gandhi's wife Kasturba Gandhi. Abha was one of the companions with Gandhi at Birla House Delhi, when Godse shot Gandhi .

== Early life ==
Kanu was born to Narandas Gandhi, a nephew of the Mahatma's and a manager at his Sabarmati Ashram, and Jamuna Gandhi in 1917. Kanu spent his early life with his parents in the ashram at Sabarmati – where his parents moved to when he was only two – and, later, at Wardha. He received his education at the Sabarmati Ashram, Ahmedabad.

== With Gandhi ==
Only 15, he was jailed for his participation in the Civil Disobedience Movement. Although he wanted to be a doctor, that was not to be and he joined Gandhi's personal staff at Wardha where he supervised clerical, correspondence and accounting functions from 1936 till 1948.

Kanu was nicknamed "Bapu's Hanuman" and was close to the Mahatma. In 1944, on Kasturba's wishes and Gandhi's blessings, he married Abhaben Chatterjee, who had been adopted by the Gandhis and had been with them since she was 13 and who came to be known as "one of Gandhi's walking sticks".

== Gandhi's photographer ==
It was Shivaji Bhave, Vinobha Bhave's brother, on a visit to Wardha, who first asked Kanu to take up photography to capture events at the Ashram. When Kanu approached Gandhi with the request, Gandhi turned him down due to paucity of funds. The industrialist GD Birla, an associate of Gandhi's gave Kanu ₹ 100 to buy his camera, a Rolleiflex, and a roll of film. From 1938 until Gandhi's death ten years later, Kanu took many personal photographs of the Mahatma.

Gandhi allowed Kanu to photograph him on three conditions: that he use no flash, that he never be asked to pose and that his photography would not be funded by the Ashram. Kanu met the costs of photography through a monthly stipend of ₹ 100 paid to him by Amritlal Gandhi of Vandemataram who had purchased a photograph of Sardar Vallabhbhai Patel from him. He also sold some of his photographs to newspapers and over time he began to produce images on a daily basis. Kanu also made films of Gandhi including one of his march in Noakhali in 1947.

Kanu however was forbidden by Gandhi from capturing Kasturba's last moments as she lay dying on his lap during his incarceration at the Aga Khan Palace in Pune. Years later as Gandhi died in Abha's lap at Birla House, Delhi, Kanu was away at Noakhali where Gandhi had ordered him to stay. Kanu's interest in photography came to an end with Gandhi's assassination although he did undertake a few assignments including one in famine affected Bihar in the 1950s.

Having had no formal training in photography, Kanu learnt the art on the job. There is variation in the quality of his work which chronicles many of the events, both momentous and mundane, in the life of Gandhi and the Ashram. His work thus forms what The Independent called a corpus of "naturally-lit black-and-white photographs, which offer an extraordinary insider's view of Gandhi's life". Kanu's original photographs remained in obscurity until they were acquired by a German collector, Peter Ruhe, in the 1980s who traced similar material and began to market them. In 2007, Ruhe proposed to sell his collection of photographs and film to the Sabarmati Ashram Trust for ₹ 5 million. These again came up for a private sale in 2012. The attempts to auction off Gandhi memorabilia generated much controversy in India.

== After Gandhi ==
Following Gandhi's assassination in 1948, Kanu and Abha Gandhi shifted to Rajkot where they ran the Kasturbadham and Rashtriyashala institutes. The Kasturbadham was the site of Kasturba Gandhi's house arrest in 1939 and had been acquired by the government after independence. Kanu ran the centre of behalf of his father to whom the government had entrusted its operations and developed it to function as a centre for small scale industries and into a secondary school. Kanu Gandhi died of a heart attack on 20 February 1986 while on a pilgrimage in Madhya Pradesh.

== Legacy ==
Although Kanu's photographs of Gandhi are renowned in India and printed in many books on Gandhi, the man himself remained out of the limelight and largely uncredited for a long while with only one exhibition in Delhi displaying them under his own name. His photographs were acquired by Ruhe from Abha following Kanu's death in 1986 and she had planned to dispose them off seeing no use for them. In 1995, the first international exhibition of Kanu's photographs was staged at the Leicester Museum & Art Gallery through the efforts of the London based artist Saleem Arif. Several scenes from Richard Attenborough's biopic Gandhi were shot on the basis of Kanu's photographs. Kanu's ultimate legacy remains "as not just a photographer but a photo-biographer of Gandhi" who did through his camera "what Mahadev Desai and Pyarelal did to immortalise Gandhi through their memoirs and biographical writings".
