= Ghandy =

Ghandy is a Parsi, Zoroastrian surname. Notable people in India with the surname include:

- Anuradha Ghandy (1954–2008), Indian communist, writer, and revolutionary leader
- Jeahangir Ghandy (1896–1972), Indian businessperson
- Kekoo Gandhy (1920–2012), Indian art gallery owner, founded Gallery Chemould in Mumbai, 1963
- Kobad Ghandy (born 1951), Indian communist and Maoist leader
- Feroze Jehangir Ghandy, also known as Feroze Gandhi (1912–1960), Indian politician and journalist

== See also ==
- Gandhi (surname)
- Gandy (surname)
