= Datrana =

Datrana or Dantrana is a village in Mendarada Taluka of Junagadh district, Gujarat, India. Historically, Datrana was the jagir consisting of 84 villages ruled by the Charanas. It has a shrine to the Hindu goddess Aai Nagbai.

The population was 1421 in the census of 1872, and 1273 in 1881 after the famine of 1878–79.

== Notable people ==
- Putlibai Gandhi - mother of Mahatma Gandhi
