= Gandy =

Gandy may refer to:

== Places in the United States ==
- Gandy, Florida, a census-designated place
- Gandy, Nebraska, a town
- Gandy, Utah, an unincorporated community
- Gandy Creek, Osceola, West Virginia - see Sinks of Gandy

== People ==
- Gandy (surname), a list of people
- Gandy Brodie (1924–1975), American painter
- Gandy Malou-Mamel (born 2005), Irish basketball player

== Other uses ==
- USS Gandy, a destroyer escort built for the United States Navy during World War II
- Gandy Bridge, crossing Tampa Bay in Florida
- Gandy Freeway, under construction in Pinellas County, Florida

== See also ==
- Gandy dancer, North American slang term for railroad worker
- Gandi, a French company providing domain name registration, web hosting, and related services
- Gandhi (disambiguation)
