= Kirti Menon =

South African activist and educator

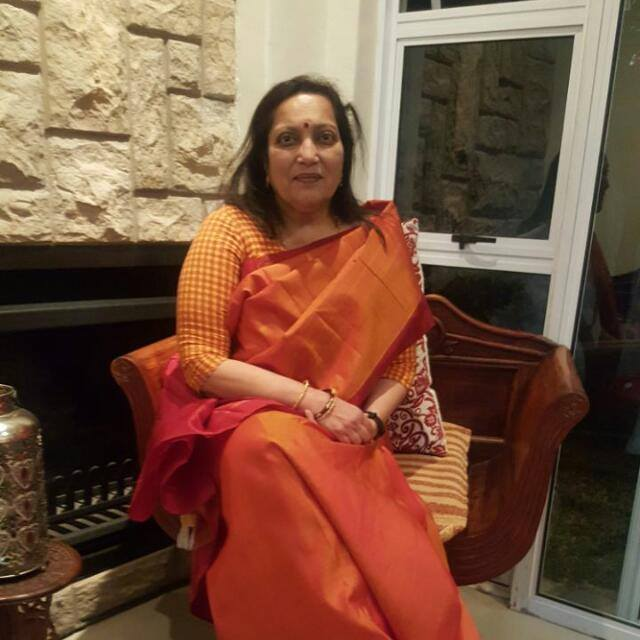
- Born: Kirti Dhupelia; 2 August 1959 (age 67); Durban, South Africa
- Citizenship: South Africa
- Education: MBA, PhD
- Alma mater: University of the Witwatersrand (PhD), De Montfort University (MBA)
- Occupations: Senior director, academic planning, University of Johannesburg
- Years active: 1985–present
- Spouse: Sunil Menon
- Children: Sunita Menon
- Parents: Shashikant Dhupelia (father); Sita Dhupelia (mother)

Kirti Menon (born Kirti Dhupelia on 2 August 1959) is an activist, educator and writer based in Johannesburg, South Africa. She is the Senior Director at the University of Johannesburg and the chairman of the Gandhi Centenary Committee, South Africa. Menon is known for reforming the policy environment in post-secondary education sector in South Africa. She is the granddaughter of Manilal Gandhi and the great-granddaughter of Mahatma Gandhi.

== Biography ==
Menon was born in 1959, in Durban, South Africa, to Sita and Shashikant Dhupelia. Her mother was the granddaughter of Mahatma Gandhi and the oldest daughter of Manilal Gandhi. Menon was raised in Durban where she completed her early education. She attended University of Durban-Westville and University of Cape Town where she received honours degree in Literature and Applied Linguistics including diploma in Journalism. Menon received her Master of Business Administration degree from De Montfort University, Leicester and completed her PhD from University of the Witwatersrand, Johannesburg in 2014.

Menon started her Academic career in early 1980s with teaching English at Vista College, East Rand and UDW. In 1985, she moved to India where she spent seven years as a journalist and wrote for multiple publications. In 1992, she returned to South Africa and joined Soweto Education Crisis Committee where she worked in uniting parents and students against apartheid. She was designated as Director of National Reviews in the Higher Education Quality Committee of the Council on Higher Education of South Africa in 2006. Menon also held position of Directorate (Accreditation) from 2007 to 2008 and was appointed as the Board member of the National Student Financial Aid Scheme and served on the ministerial committee. She also held the position of registrar at the University of the Witwatersrand between 2011 and 2013.

In 2015, Menon joined University of Johannesburg as Senior Director of Academic Planning, Quality Promotion and Academic Staff Development. She is also a member of University of Johannesburg's senate ad hoc task team on Decolonization of Knowledge and Curriculum Reform. She has also held the position of acting Deputy Director General of the Universities in the Department of Higher Education and Training from 2010 to 2011. Previously, she was appointed as Chief Director of Higher Education Planning and Development, National Department of Education and held the position between 2008 and 2010. Menon's work includes researching and writing on decolonization of higher education system in South Africa. She has authored two publications on this topics. Her works have refined policy environment in higher education system in the country.

Menon is married to Sunil Menon and currently resides in Johannesburg, South Africa. Their daughter, Sunita Menon, is a journalist with a South African national daily, Business Day.

== Publications ==
- Value for money and quality in higher education (2006) with Theo Bhengu and Nhlanhla Cele
- Higher Education in the BRICS Countries (2015)
- Engaging Higher Education curricula: a critical citizenship perspective (2017)

== Notes ==
- "Writing the Life of Manilal Mohandas Gandhi," Journal of Natal and Zulu History 24 & 25 (2006–2007): 188–213.
- Critical Studies in Teaching and Learning – Engaging Higher Education Curricula: A Critical Citizenship Perspective – African Journals Online (AJOL)
- Quality and Recognition in Higher Education The Cross-border Challenge: The Cross-border Challenge
- Higher Education in the BRICS Countries: Investigating the Pact between Higher Education and Society
