= Dick Jones (Kansas politician) =

American politician (1942–2024)

Member of the Kansas House of Representatives from the 52nd district
- In office January 12, 2015 – January 9, 2017
- Preceded by: Shanti Gandhi
- Succeeded by: Brenda Dietrich

Personal details
- Born: January 21, 1942 Alhambra, California, U.S.
- Died: March 11, 2024 (aged 82)
- Party: Republican
- Spouse: Deborah Barnes
- Children: 5
- Profession: US Navy Seebees, retired

Fredrick Richard Jones (January 21, 1942 – March 11, 2024) was an American politician. He served as a Republican member for the 52nd district in the Kansas House of Representatives from 2015 to 2017.
