= Leela Gandhi =

Indian-born literary and cultural theorist

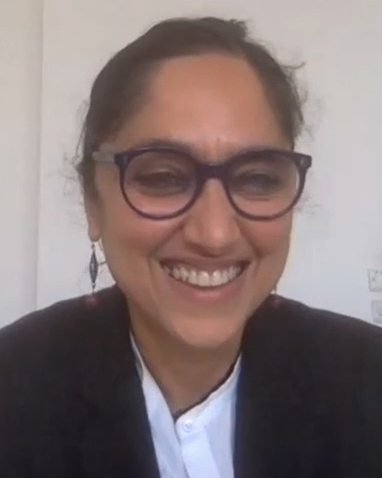
- Born: 1966 (age 59–60); Mumbai, India
- Parent: Ramchandra Gandhi
- Relatives: Mahatma Gandhi (great-grandfather); C. Rajagopalachari (great-grandfather)

Academic background
- Education: Hindu College, Delhi; Balliol College, Oxford

Academic work
- Discipline: Cultural and literary theory
- School or tradition: Postcolonial
- Institutions: Brown University; Pembroke Center; University of Chicago

Leela Gandhi (born 1966) is an Indian-born literary and cultural theorist who is noted for her work in postcolonial theory. She is currently the John Hawkes Professor of Humanities and English and director of the Pembroke Center for Teaching and Research on Women at Brown University. She is the great-granddaughter of Mahatma Gandhi.

Gandhi previously taught at the University of Chicago, La Trobe University, and the University of Delhi. She is a founding co-editor of the academic journal Postcolonial Studies, and she serves on the editorial board of the electronic journal Postcolonial Text. She is a Senior Fellow of the School of Criticism and Theory at Cornell University.

== Early life and education ==
Gandhi was born in Mumbai and is the daughter of the late Indian philosopher Ramchandra Gandhi and the great-granddaughter of the Indian Independence movement leader Mahatma Gandhi. She has offered analysis that some of Mahatma Gandhi's philosophies (on nonviolence and vegetarianism, for example) and policies were influenced by transnational as well as indigenous sources. She received her undergraduate degree from Hindu College, Delhi and her doctorate was from Balliol College, Oxford.

She is also the great-granddaughter of C. Rajagopalachari. Her paternal grandfather Devdas Gandhi was the youngest son of Mahatma Gandhi and her paternal grandmother Lakshmi was the daughter of C. Rajagopalachari.

== Reviews and critiques ==
With the publication of her first book Postcolonial Theory: A Critical Introduction in 1998, Gandhi was described as mapping "the field in terms of its wider philosophical and intellectual context, drawing important connections between postcolonial theory and poststructuralism, postmodernism, Marxism and feminism."

Her next book, Affective Communities, was written to "[reveal] for the first time how those associated with marginalized lifestyles, subcultures, and traditions—including homosexuality, vegetarianism, animal rights, spiritualism, and aestheticism—united against imperialism and forged strong bonds with colonized subjects and cultures". Gandhi traces the social networks of activists in the late nineteenth and early twentieth centuries connecting Edward Carpenter with M.K. Gandhi and Mirra Alfassa with Sri Aurobindo.

Through this work, Gandhi became noted for proposing a "conceptual model of postcolonial engagement" surrounding ethical premises of hospitality and "xenophilia", and for bringing for the first time a queer perspective to postcolonial theory.

Gandhi's third book, The Common Cause, presents a transnational history of democracy in the first half of the twentieth century through the lens of ethics in the broad sense of disciplined self-fashioning. This book has been described as "an alternate history of democracy foregrounding events of errant relation," and "the most thoroughgoing defence of the value of infinite inclusivity to postcolonial studies."

Leela Gandhi is also a published poet. Her first collection of poems, Measures of Home, was published by Ravi Dayal in 2000, and her subsequent poetry is included in several anthologies.

== Published books ==
- Gandhi, Leela (2014), The Common Cause: Postcolonial Ethics and the Practice of Democracy, 1900–1955, University of Chicago Press, ISBN 9780226019901
- Gandhi, Leela; Nelson, Deborah L., eds. (Summer 2014), Around 1948: Interdisciplinary Approaches to Global Transformation, Critical Inquiry, vol. 40, JSTOR 10.1086/673748
- Ezekiel, Nissim; Gandhi, Leela; Thierne, John (2006), Collected Poems, Oxford India Paperbacks (2 ed.), Oxford University Press, ISBN 9780195672497
- Gandhi, Leela (2006), Affective Communities: Anticolonial Thought, Fin-de-Siècle Radicalism, and the Politics of Friendship, Politics, History, and Culture, Duke University Press, ISBN 0-8223-3715-0
- Blake, Ann; Gandhi, Leela; Thomas, Sue, eds. (2001), England Through Colonial Eyes in Twentieth-Century Fiction, Palgrave Macmillan, ISBN 0-333-73744-X
- Gandhi, Leela (1998), Postcolonial Theory: A Critical Introduction, Columbia University Press, ISBN 0-231-11273-4
- Gandhi, Leela (2000), Measures of Home: Poems, Orient Longman, ISBN 817530023X
