= Tushar Gandhi =

Indian author

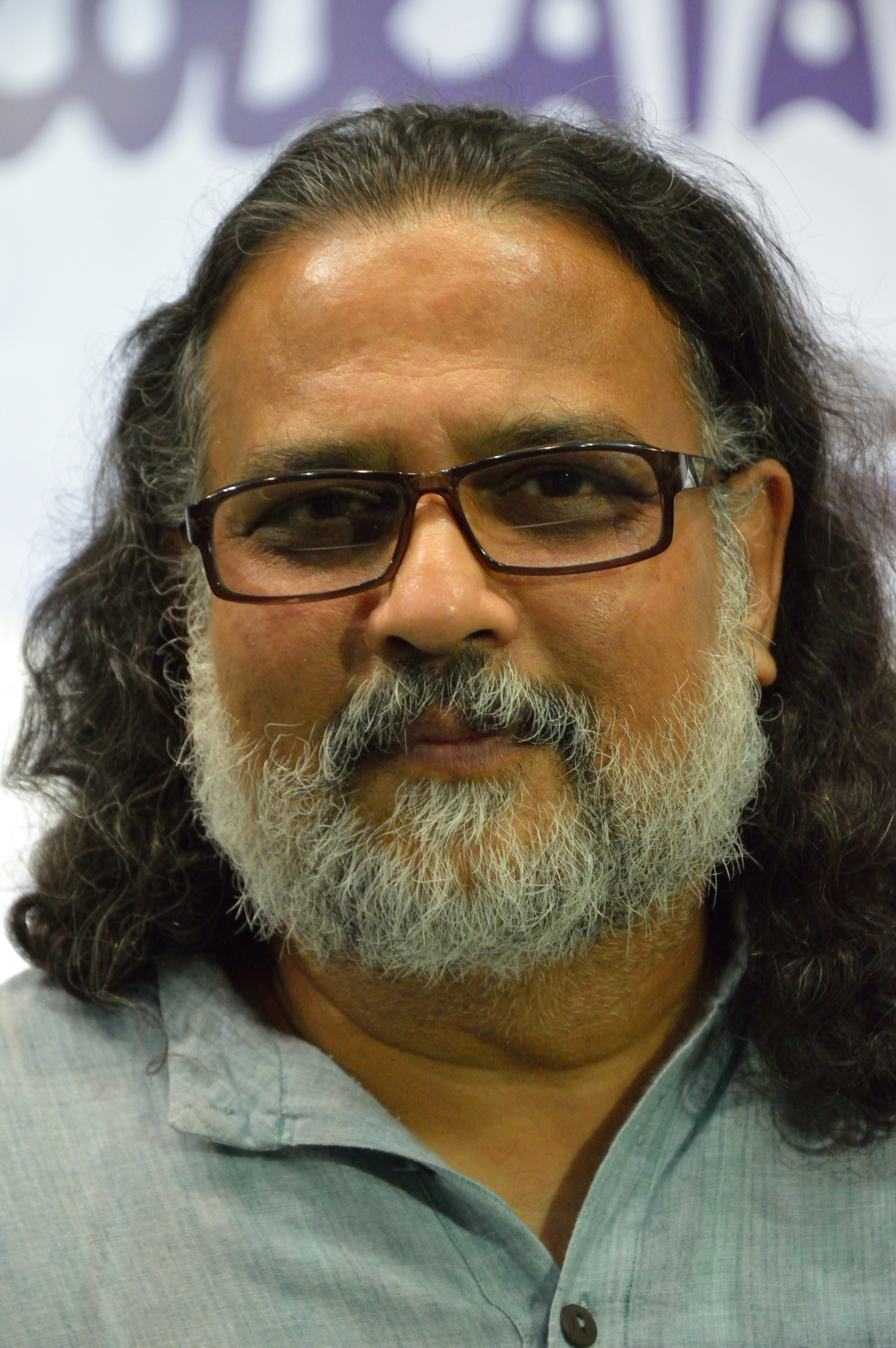
- Gandhi in 2014
- Born: Tushar Arun Gandhi; 17 January 1960 (age 66); Born on train between Mumbai and Kolkata halted on Shegaon
- Education: Mithibai College
- Political party: Indian National Congress
- Board member of: Managing Trustee, Mahatma Gandhi Foundation
- Spouse: Sonal Desai (m. 1985)
- Children: 2
- Parent(s): Arun Manilal Gandhi; Sunanda Gandhi
- Relatives: Manilal Gandhi (grandfather); Mahatma Gandhi (great-grandfather); Kasturba Gandhi (great-grandmother)
- Website: Official website

Tushar Arun Gandhi (born 17 January 1960) is an Indian author and son of Arun Manilal Gandhi, thus great-grandson of Mahatma Gandhi. In March 2005, he led the 75th anniversary re-enactment of the Dandi March.

== Early life ==
Tushar Arun Gandhi was born on 17 January 1960, on train between Mumbai and Kolkata, halted on Shegaon railway station, to Arun and Sunanda Gandhi. His father was an author and his mother was a researcher. Tushar was raised in the Mumbai suburb of Santacruz. He studied at Adarsh Vinay Mandir, a local Gujarati-medium school. He holds a diploma in printing from the Government Institute of Printing Technology, Mumbai.

== Personal life ==
Gandhi resides in Mumbai. In 1985, he married Sonal Desai. Together, they have 2 children, son Vivan Gandhi and daughter Kasturi Gandhi. Kasturi was so named after Kasturba Gandhi.

== Career ==
Tushar Gandhi is best known for having established in 1998 in Vadodara, Gujarat, the Mahatma Gandhi Foundation. It is now located in Mumbai (and he is still its president).

Since 1996, he has served as the President of the Lok Seva Trust, an NGO established by Dr. Kanti Gandhi, grandson of Mahatma Gandhi in central Bombay in the mid-1950s for the welfare of textile-mill labourers.

In 2000, Tushar portrayed himself in a fictional Tamil - Hindi movie directed by Kamal Hassan, "Hey Ram".

In 2001, Tushar Gandhi negotiated with American marketing firm CMG Worldwide the use of the Mahatma's image in an advertisement (aimed at university students) for a credit card company. This perceived betrayal of Gandhian ideals was followed by a public outcry causing him to cancel the deal.

On January 30, 2003, as the 55th anniversary of his great-grandfather's assassination approaches. He and 150 other politicians have led a hunger strike in New Delhi because of Clone High's depiction of Gandhi caused a massive backlash.

In 2009, he did likewise in a semi-fictional movie, "Road to Sangam," based on an episode in his own life.

A non-fiction book by him, Let's Kill Gandhi, was published in 2007 and became for a few weeks a best seller in India. Tushar in his book Let’s Kill Gandhi, blamed Brahmins in general for assassinating Mahatma Gandhi. Some critics claimed that the book defamed all Brahmins. Tushar has said he was misquoted and his claims relate only to "a certain group of Brahmins from Pune [who] were continuously attempting on the life of my great grandfather", rather than to Brahmins in general.

In 2008 he was appointed Chairman of the Australian Indian Rural Development Foundation (AIRDF).

He is trustee at Maharashtra Gandhi Smarak Nidhi since 2014.

In 2018 he played a significant role in petitioning successfully the Supreme Court of India to direct the states and Union Territories to comply with its orders to curb cow-vigilante lynch mobs.

In 2019 he became a Director of the Gandhi Research Foundation in Jalgaon, Maharashtra. He joined the Bharat Jodo Yatra with Rahul Gandhi in Shegaon, Buldhana district.
