= Harilal Gandhi =

Mahatma Gandhi & Kasturba Gandhi's son

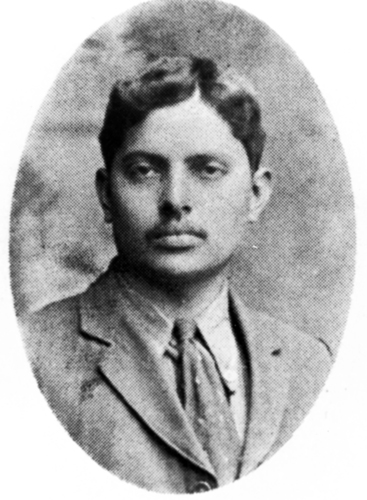
- Gandhi in 1910
- Born: Harilal Mohandas Gandhi; 23 August 1888; Rajkot, Rajkot State, British India
- Died: 18 June 1948 (aged 59); Bombay, Bombay Province, India
- Other names: Harilal Gandhi; Abdullah Gandhi
- Spouse: Gulab Gandhi
- Children: 4
- Parents: Mahatma Gandhi (father); Kasturba Gandhi (mother)

Harilal Mohandas Gandhi (formerly Abdullah Gandhi; born Harilal Mohandas Gandhi; 23 August 1888 – 18 June 1948) was the eldest son of Mahatma Gandhi and Kasturba Gandhi. He had three younger brothers: Manilal Gandhi, Ramdas Gandhi and Devdas Gandhi.

== Early life ==
Harilal was born on 23 August 1888, just before his father left for England for higher studies. Harilal remained in India with his mother.

Harilal was involved in the Indian independence movement, and was imprisoned as a satyagrahi six times between 1908 and 1911. His willingness to endure these sentences earned him the nickname of 'Chhote (Little) Gandhi'.

He too wanted to go to England for higher studies, hoping to become a barrister as his father had once been. His father however firmly opposed this, believing that a Western-style education would not be helpful in the struggle against British rule over India, leading to tensions between father and son. Eventually rebelling against his father's decision, in 1911 Harilal renounced all family ties.

In 1906 he married Gulab Gandhi, with whom he had five children: two daughters, Rami, and Manu; and three sons, Kantilal, Rasiklal and Shantilal. Rasiklal and Shantilal died at an early age. He had four grandchildren (Anushrya, Prabodh, Neelam Solanki, and Navmalika) via Rani, two (Shanti and Pradeep) via Kantilal, and one (Urmi) via Manu. After Gulab died during the 1918 influenza pandemic, Harilal became detached from his children. He contemplated marrying his wife's sister Kumi Adalaja, who was a child widow, however this did not materialize. This led to Harilal's further descent and he gradually became an alcoholic.

In 1925, Harilal had lent Mahatma Gandhi's name to a Calcutta firm All India Stores. One of the investor of this firm was a Muslim from Lyallpur, he feared this was a bogus fair. He sent a legal notice to Young India, whose editor was Mahatma Gandhi. Gandhi replied that 'Harilal was indeed his son but his ideals and mine are different and he has been living separately since 1915'.

He stayed in touch with his father sporadically through the years, sometimes through commonly known people, right up to 1947.

Harilal appeared at his father's funeral in such a poor health condition that few recognized him.

Neelam Parikh, the daughter of Ranibehn, the eldest of Harilal's children, wrote a biography of him subsequently, entitled Gandhiji's Lost Jewel: Harilal Gandhi.

== Religious conversions ==
In May 1936, at the age of 48, Harilal publicly converted to Islam and named himself Abdullah Gandhi. Later on he re-converted to Hinduism.. Mahatma Gandhi responded publicly in his journal Harijan, stating that he had no objection if the conversion had been sincere, but believed Harilal's acceptance of Islam was motivated by material benefit rather than genuine faith, and that those who had facilitated the conversion had exploited his weaknesses. Kasturba Gandhi was deeply distressed; she wrote to Harilal on 27 September 1936 expressing her anguish, and separately wrote to his Muslim associates condemning their role in the episode. Later that year, in November 1936, Harilal renounced Islam and was reconverted to Hinduism through a ceremony conducted by the Arya Samaj, after which he adopted the name Harilal.

== Letters from Mahatma Gandhi ==
In June 1935, Mahatma Gandhi wrote a letter to Harilal, accusing him of "alcohol and debauchery". In the letters, Mahatma Gandhi stated that Harilal's problems were more difficult for him to deal with than the struggle for an independent India. In one of these letters, Gandhi also accused Harilal of rape, the victims being either his sister-in-law or his daughters.

In 2014 three letters written by Mahatma Gandhi to Harilal in 1935 were offered for auction.

== Death ==
Harilal died of tuberculosis four months after his father's assassination, on the night of 18 June 1948, aged 59 at a municipal hospital (now the Sewri TB Hospital) in Mumbai. His death certificate is preserved at the Brihanmumbai Municipal Corporation's archives in Vakola. Harilal's death certificate reveals that he was admitted to the hospital after being found unconscious in Kamathipura. Harilal did not reveal to the staff that he was Gandhi's son, and his family only found out about his hospitalisation after his death.

== Gandhi, My Father ==
The troubled relationship between Harilal and his father is the subject of the film and play Gandhi, My Father. The film adaptation was released on 3 August 2007 and directed by Feroz Abbas Khan and produced by Anil Kapoor. Harilal is portrayed by Akshaye Khanna. Khan's play, Mahatma vs. Gandhi, while different from this film, had a similar theme. The film got positive reviews from critics but was a failure at box office.

There is also a Marathi play named Gandhi virudh Gandhi.

== Family ==
Ancestors of Harilal Gandhi

4. Karamchand Gandhi
2. Mohandas Karamchand Gandhi
5. Putlibai Gandhi
1. Harilal Gandhi
3. Kasturba Mohandas Gandhi
