= Ramaswamy R Iyer =

Indian civil servant (born 1929)

Ramaswamy R. Iyer
- Born: Tamil Nadu
- Occupation(s): Civil Servant, Activist, Policy Maker
- Awards: Padma Shri

Ramaswamy R Iyer (October 1929 - 9 September 2015) was an Indian civil servant, activist, water policy expert who received the padma shri, the fourth-highest civilian honor in India in 2014.

== Life ==
Iyer was born in Oct 1929 in Thakkali Tamil Nadu. He served as an honorary research professor at CPR (Center for Policy Research), Delhi, served as secretary of water resources in the Government of India. He was appointed as Secretary of Water Resources in June 1985 and he is credited to have drafted India's first National Water Policy in 1987. He was a friend of the philosopher K. J. Shah.

He was also a writer. His book, Living Rivers, Dying Rivers (Oxford University Press, 2015) presents a grim pictures of rivers in decline.
