= K. J. Shah =

Indian philosopher and professor

K. J. 'Kanti' Shah (1922–1994) was a 20th century Indian philosopher and professor at Karnataka University.

== Biography ==
Shah was born in Gujarat, India. He received a Bachelor of Arts from the School of Economics and Sociology at the University of Bombay. He attended Cambridge University in the latter half of the 1940s where he was taught by Ludwig Wittgenstein. His lectures notes were later compiled with those of A. C. Jackson and Peter Geach and published as Wittgenstein's Lectures on Philosophical Psychology, 1946–47. While at Cambridge he got to know the author Iris Murdoch who he discussed Wittgenstein with. Iris Murdoch mentions Kanti Shah in her Journal (no. 15, 1992–96 at the Iris Murdoch Collections, Kingston University Archives). In 1948 he travelled to County Galway in Ireland to visit Wittgenstein.

As was the case with his other students, Wittgenstein had a significant impact on Shah, who reportedly picked up some of his speaking mannerisms. They used to go on long walks together. On one occasion Wittgenstein asked him if he was a Muslim or a Hindu. Shah informed him that he was a Jain, to which Wittgenstein asked if it was true that the Jains believed that the enlightened ones all come together on a rock to meditate when they die. This embarrassed Shah who told him "I don't believe in these foolish things now". Wittgenstein was furious and scolded Shah that "You think you are very clever, Shah, you think you know more than these ancestors of yours who have thought about these things for thousands of years?". This remark had a profound impact on him and inspired Shah to dedicate his life to understanding his ancestor's intellectual and spiritual traditions.

His work focused on Indian philosophy, particularly the political philosophy of Mahatma Gandhi, whose grandson Ramchandra Gandhi he befriended. Among his friends he also counted Ramaswamy R Iyer, who dedicated his book Towards Water Wisdom: Limits, Justice, Harmony to his memory. The book Word and Sentence; Two Perspectives: Bhartrhari and Wittgenstein, a collection of essays discussing Bhartrhari and Wittgenstein, was the product of a seminar organised by Shah on this topic. It is dedicated to his memory.

== Selected bibliography ==
- Some Presuppositions of Gandhi's Thought (1969) in S.C. Biswas (ed.), Gandhi: Theory and Practice, Social Impact and Contemporary Relevance (Indian Institute of Advanced Study), pp. 513-31.
- Conflict and Consensus: Some Considerations (1978) in Indian Philosophical Quarterly, Vol 4 No 1, pp. 101-7.
- The Emergency — The Way Out (1980) in Indian Philosophical Quarterly, Vol 7, No 3, pp. 327-37.
- Of artha and the Arthaśāstra (1981) in Contributions to Indian Sociology, Vol. 15, No. 1-2), 55-73.
- Foreword (1983) in V. S. Hegde, Gandhi's Philosophy of Law (Concept Publishing Company).
- In Search of Development (1984) in Indian Philosophical Quarterly, Vol. 11, No. 1, pp. 5-13.
- Word and Sentence; Two Perspectives: Bhartrhari and Wittgenstein (2002) in Sibajiban Bhattacharyya (ed.) Word and Sentence; Two Perspectives: Bhartrhari and Wittgenstein (Sahitya Akademi).
