= Gopalkrishna Gandhi =

Indian civil servant and diplomat

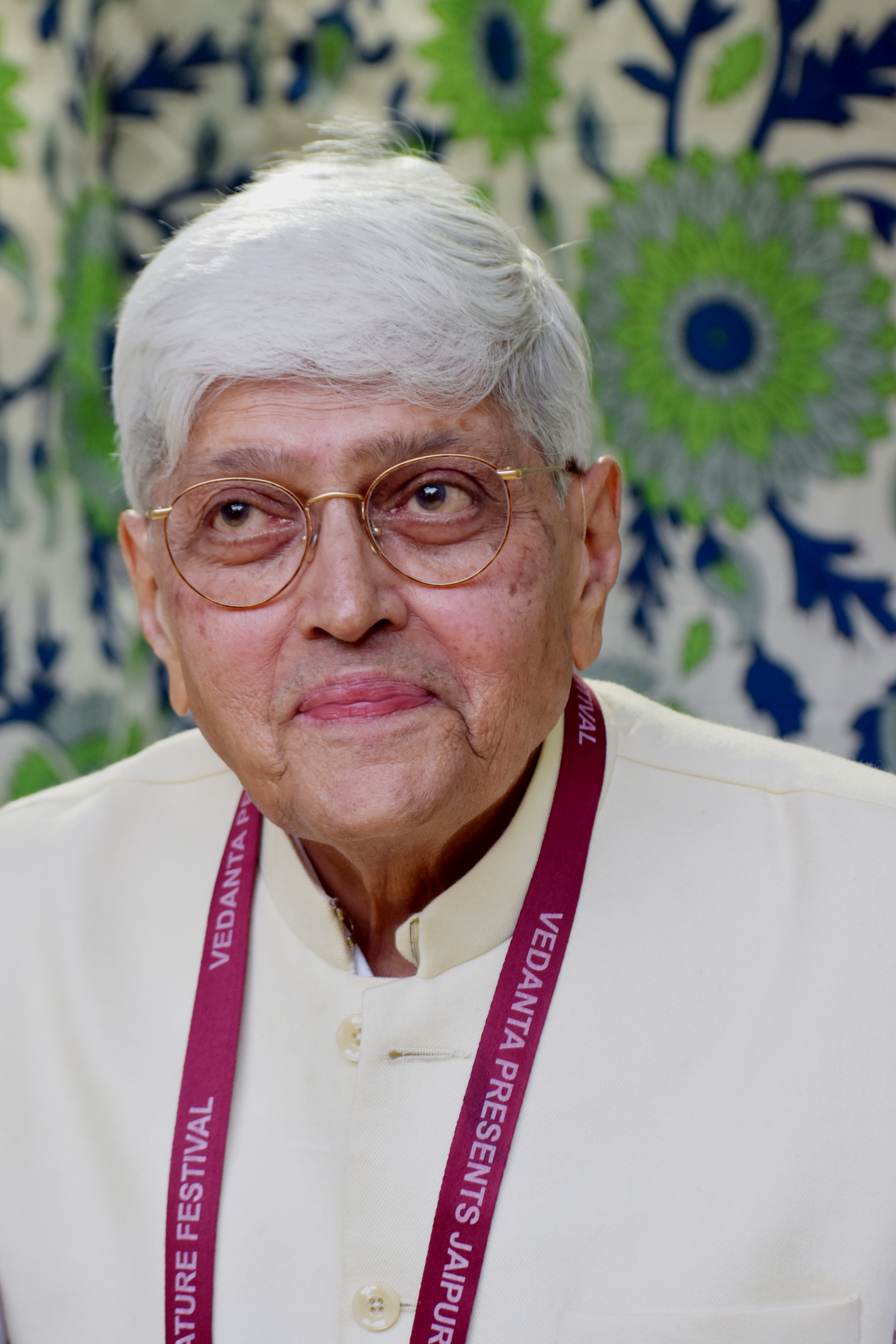

17th Governor of West Bengal
- In office 14 December 2004 – 14 December 2009
- Chief Minister: Buddhadeb Bhattacharjee
- Preceded by: Viren J. Shah
- Succeeded by: Devanand Konwar (additional charge)

Governor of Bihar (additional charge)
- In office 31 January 2006 – 21 June 2006
- Chief Minister: Nitish Kumar
- Preceded by: Buta Singh
- Succeeded by: R. S. Gavai

Personal details
- Born: Gopalkrishna Devadas Gandhi; 22 April 1945 (age 81) Delhi, British India
- Party: Independent
- Spouse: Tara Gandhi
- Children: 2
- Parent: Devdas Gandhi (father)
- Relatives: Ramchandra Gandhi (brother); Rajmohan Gandhi (brother); Mahatma Gandhi (paternal grandfather); Kasturba Gandhi (paternal grandmother); C. Rajagopalachari (maternal grandfather)
- Education: St. Stephen's College, Delhi
- Occupation: Professor of History and Politics at Ashoka University

Gopalkrishna Devadas Gandhi (Note: In this Indian name, Devdas is a patronymic and the family name is Gandhi.) (born 22 April 1945) is a former administrator and diplomat who served as the 22nd Governor of West Bengal from 2004 to 2009. He is the grandson of Mahatma Gandhi and C. Rajagopalachari (Rajaji). As a former IAS officer he served as Secretary to the President of India and as High Commissioner to South Africa and Sri Lanka, among other administrative and diplomatic posts. He was the United Progressive Alliance nominee for Vice President of India in the 2017 vice-presidential elections and lost with 244 votes against NDA candidate Venkaiah Naidu, who got 516 votes.

== Early life and background ==
Gopalkrishna Devadas Gandhi was born on 22 April 1945 in Delhi, to Devdas and Lakshmi Gandhi. His father was a journalist. Gandhi graduated with a master's degree in English literature from St. Stephen's College.

== Career ==
He joined IAS as an officer in 1968 and served in Tamil Nadu state till 1985. Thereafter, he remained secretary to the Vice President of India (1985–1987) and secretary to the President of India (1987–1992).

In 1992, after retiring voluntarily from the IAS, he became minister (culture) in high commission of India, UK and director of The Nehru Centre, London, UK. This was followed by various diplomatic and administrative positions for the rest of his career, including high commissioner of India to South Africa and Lesotho (1996), secretary to the president of India (1997–2000), high commissioner of India in Sri Lanka (2000), and ambassador of India to Norway, and Iceland (2002).

On 14 December 2004, he was appointed Governor of West Bengal following the expiry of the term of office of incumbent Viren J. Shah. He was succeeded by Devanand Konwar, who was given additional charge of West Bengal. For a few months in 2006 he also took on additional duties as the Governor of Bihar.

He was the chairman of Kalakshetra Foundation, Chennai from December 2011 to May 2014. In 2015, he translated the Tamil classic, the Tirukkural, into English. He was the chairman of governing body of Indian Institute of Advanced Study, and president of its society on 5 March 2012 and served until May 2014.

Gandhi teaches at Ashoka University, where he is a professor of history and politics.

== Controversies ==
While delivering the 15th D P Kohli Memorial Lecture for CBI on "Eclipse at Noon: Shadows Over India's Conscience" with nearly 3000 officers of the agency in the audience, Gandhi noted that "The CBI is seen as the government's hatchet, rather than honesty's ally. It is often called DDT — meaning not the dichloro diphenyl trichloroethane, the colourless, tasteless, odourless insecticide it should be, but the department of dirty tricks."

In 2015, he wrote a letter to the then President of India, Pranab Mukherjee, to reconsider the rejection of the mercy plea of the 1993 Mumbai serial blast convict, Yakub Memon.

== Personal life ==
His paternal grandfather was Mahatma Gandhi and maternal grandfather was C. Rajagopalachari (Rajaji). He is the son of Devadas Gandhi and Lakshmi Gandhi. Gopalkrishna Gandhi is the younger brother of Rajmohan Gandhi and Ramchandra Gandhi. He and his wife Tara have two daughters.

== Bibliography ==
Hindi

- Saranam, translated as Refuge in English
- Dara Shukoh, a play in verse
- Koi Acchha Sa Larka (translation into Hindustani of Vikram Seth's A Suitable Boy)

English

- Gandhi and South Africa
- Gandhi and Sri Lanka
- Nehru and Sri Lanka
- India House, Colombo: Portrait of a Residence
- Gandhi Is Gone. Who Will Guide Us Now? (edited)
- A Frank Friendship/ Gandhi and Bengal: A Descriptive Chronology (compiled and edited).
- Tiruvalluvar: The Tirukkural (translated from the Tamil original) (2015)
- "Restless as Mercury : My Life As A Young Man" (ed. Aleph, 2021)
- "Scorching Love : Letters from M.K.Gandhi to his son Devadas" (ed. with Tridip Suhrud, OUP, 2022)

== See also ==
- List of translators into English

Political offices
Preceded by Viren J. Shah	Governor of West Bengal; 2004–2009	Succeeded by Devanand Konwar
Preceded by Buta Singh	Governor of Bihar; 2006	Succeeded by R. S. Gavai
