= J. E. Gandy =

American politician

Dr. J. E. Gandy
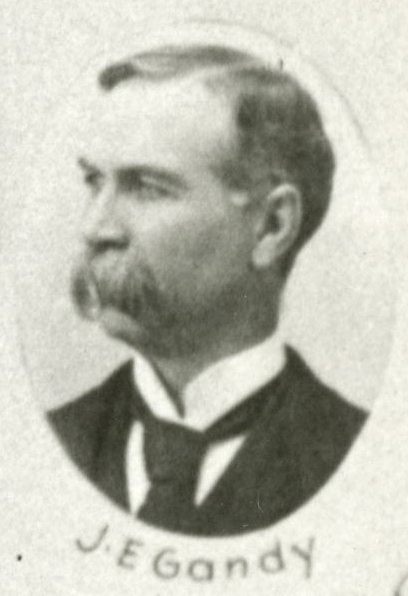
- Gandy in 1896

Member of the Washington House of Representatives for the 4th district
- In office 1889; 1891–1893; 1895–1897

Personal details
- Born: August 24, 1847 Fond du Lac County, Wisconsin, United States
- Died: June 2, 1934 (aged 86) Spokane, Washington, United States
- Party: Republican

Joseph Edward Gandy (August 24, 1847 – June 2, 1934) was an American politician in the state of Washington. He served as a Republican in the Washington House of Representatives.
