= Rajmohan Gandhi =

Indian historian, biographer and academic (born 1935)

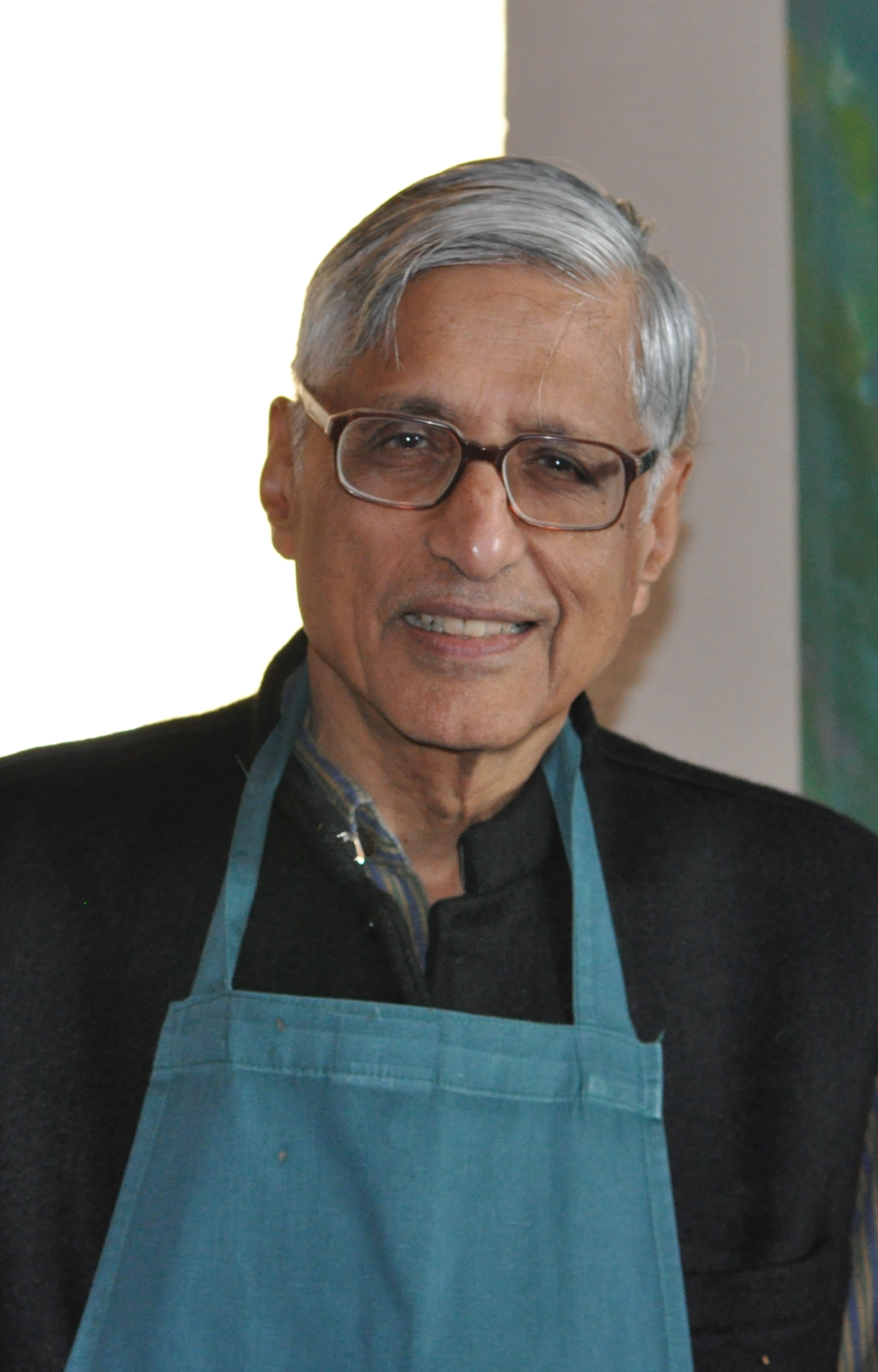
- Gandhi in 2009

Member of Parliament, Rajya Sabha
- In office 1990-92
- Constituency: Uttar Pradesh

Personal details
- Born: 7 August 1935 (age 91) New Delhi, British India
- Party: Aam Aadmi Party
- Other political affiliations: Janata Dal
- Spouse: Usha Gandhi
- Children: 2
- Parent: Devdas Gandhi (father)
- Relatives: Ramchandra Gandhi (brother); Gopalkrishna Gandhi (brother); Mahatma Gandhi (paternal grandfather); Kasturba Gandhi (paternal grandmother); C. Rajagopalachari (maternal grandfather)
- Occupation: Biographer, journalist, politician
- Awards: International Humanitarian Award (human rights)
- Website: Official website

Rajmohan Gandhi (born 7 August 1935) is an Indian biographer, historian, politician and research professor at the Center for South Asian and Middle Eastern Studies, University of Illinois at Urbana-Champaign, US. His paternal grandfather is Mahatma Gandhi, and his maternal grandfather is Chakravarthi Rajagopalachari. He is also a scholar in residence at the Indian Institute of Technology Gandhinagar.

In 1989, he joined Janata Dal and unsuccessfully contested Lok Sabha elections against Rajiv Gandhi. In 2014, he joined the Aam Aadmi Party. He again ran for the Lok Sabha from the East Delhi constituency but lost.

== Early life ==
Rajmohan Gandhi was born 7 August 1935 in New Delhi, to Devdas and Lakshmi Gandhi. His father was the managing editor of the Hindustan Times. Rajmohan Gandhi attended St. Stephen's College. His maternal grandfather was C. Rajagopalachari, the last Governor General of India (succeeding Lord Louis Mountbatten), who was one of the foremost associates of Mahatma Gandhi.

== Career ==
=== Academic career and activism ===
In the 1960s and early 1970s, Gandhi played a leading role in establishing Asia Plateau, the conference centre of Initiatives of Change in Panchgani, in the mountains of western India.

In 2002, Gandhi received the Sahitya Akademi Award for Rajaji: A Life, a Biography of Chakravarti Rajagopalachari (1878–1972), about his maternal grandfather, a leading figure in India's independence movement.

His other works include Ghaffar Khan: Nonviolent Badshah of the Pakhtuns (Penguin 2004); Revenge & Reconciliation: Understanding South Asian History (Penguin, 1999); Patel: A Life, a Biography of Vallabhbhai Patel (1875–1950), Deputy Prime Minister of India, 1947-50 (Navajivan, Ahmedabad, 1990); and Eight Lives: A Study of the Hindu-Muslim Encounter (SUNY, 1987). One of his earlier books, The Good Boatman: A Portrait of Gandhi, was published in 2009 in a Chinese translation in Beijing. Most recently, Gandhi has published a book titled, Punjab (Aleph Book Company 2013), which is a historical account of undivided Punjab, from the death of Aurangzeb to the Partition.

Before teaching at the University of Illinois, he served as a research professor with the New Delhi think-tank, Centre for Policy Research. From 1985 to 1987, he edited the daily Indian Express in Madras (now Chennai). In 2004 he received the International Humanitarian Award (Human Rights) from the city of Champaign, Illinois, and in 1997, he was awarded an honorary doctorate of law from the University of Calgary, and an honorary doctorate of philosophy from Obirin University, Tokyo. He currently serves as a Jury Member for the Nuremberg International Human Rights Award and co-chair of the Centre for Dialogue & Reconciliation in Gurgaon. In 2019 he was a contributor to A New Divan: A Lyrical Dialogue Between East and West (Gingko Library).

In 2018, he opposed the partition of the British India at the Oxford Union and said, “To welcome Partition is to imply that people with different backgrounds and different blood-lines cannot live together in one nation. A regressive suggestion.” He opined that "The corollary that those possessing a common religion or common race enjoy blissful companionship in their homes, nations or regions is, well, hilarious." He holds that "tyranny was multiplied by partition". Gandhi further believes that "India belongs to all who live in it."

=== Politics ===
In 1989, Gandhi unsuccessfully contested the Lok Sabha election from Janata Dal against Rajiv Gandhi in Amethi. He served (1990–92) in the Rajya Sabha (the upper house of the Indian Parliament) and led the Indian delegation to the UN Human Rights Commission in Geneva in 1990. In the Indian Parliament he was the convener of the all-party joint committee of both houses addressing the condition of Scheduled Castes and Scheduled Tribes.

On 21 February 2014, he joined the Aam Aadmi Party. He contested the 2014 general election from the East Delhi constituency and lost.

== Personal life ==
Rajmohan Gandhi is married to Usha. They have two children.
