= Ela Gandhi =

South African politician (born 1940)

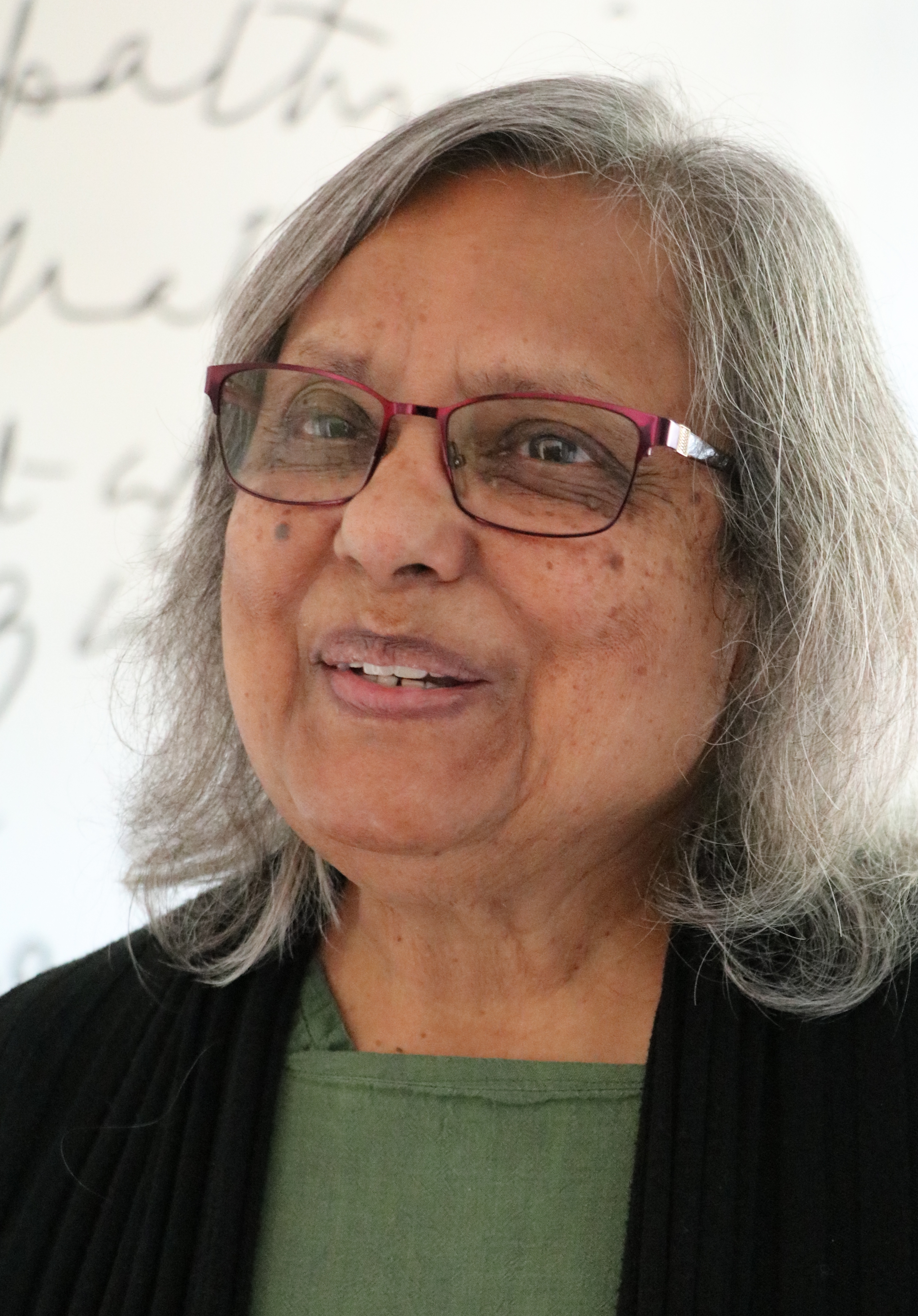
- Gandhi at Phoenix Settlement, South Africa, 2018

MP for KwaZulu-Natal
- In office 1994–2004
- Preceded by: Multi-member district
- Succeeded by: Multi-member district

Personal details
- Born: 1 July 1940 (age 86) Durban, Natal Province, South Africa
- Party: African National Congress
- Spouse: Mewa Ramgobin (m. 1960; div. 1990)
- Parents: Manilal Gandhi; Sushila Mashruwala
- Relatives: Arun Manilal Gandhi (brother); Mahatma Gandhi (grandfather); Kasturba Gandhi (grandmother)
- Education: University of Natal
- Occupation: Politician, activist

Ela Gandhi (born 1 July 1940), is a South African peace activist and former politician. She served as a Member of Parliament in South Africa from 1994 to 2004, where she aligned with the African National Congress (ANC) party representing the Phoenix area of Inanda in the KwaZulu-Natal province. Her parliamentary committee assignments included the Welfare, and Public Enterprises committees as well as the ad hoc committee on Surrogate Motherhood. She was an alternate member of the Justice Committee and served on Theme Committee 5 on Judiciary and Legal Systems. She is the granddaughter of Mahatma Gandhi.

== Early life ==
Ela Gandhi was born in Durban, South Africa. Her father Manilal Gandhi was editor of the Indian Opinion and ran the Phoenix Settlement; it had been founded by her grandfather Mahatma Gandhi and it was where she grew up. She received her B.A. degree at the former Natal University and later received a B.A. in social science with honors from UNISA. Following graduation, she worked as a social worker with the Verulam Child and Family Welfare Society for 15 years and the Durban Indian Child and Family Welfare Society for five years.

She married Mewa Ramgobin and had five children. One son was shot dead in a home invasion in 1993 and their daughter Ashish Lata Ramgobin was found guilty of fraud and sentenced to seven years imprisonment in 2021.

== Career ==
Gandhi served as an executive member of the Natal Organisation of Women from its inception until 1991. Her political affiliations include the Natal Indian Congress, which she served as vice president, the United Democratic Front, Descom Crisis Network, and Inanda Support Committee. During apartheid, Gandhi was banned in 1975 from political activism and subjected to house arrest for a total of nine years. She was among the members of the United Democratic Front who met with Nelson Mandela prior to his release from Pollsmoor Prison on February 11, 1990. Prior to the 1994 elections, Gandhi was a member of the Transitional Executive Council.

== Post parliament ==
After serving in parliament, Gandhi developed a 24-hour program against domestic violence, founded the Gandhi Development Trust, serves as a member of the Religious Affairs Committee, and oversees a monthly newspaper. She also chairs the Mahatma Gandhi Salt March Committee and the Mahatma Gandhi Development Trust.

== Awards and recognitions ==
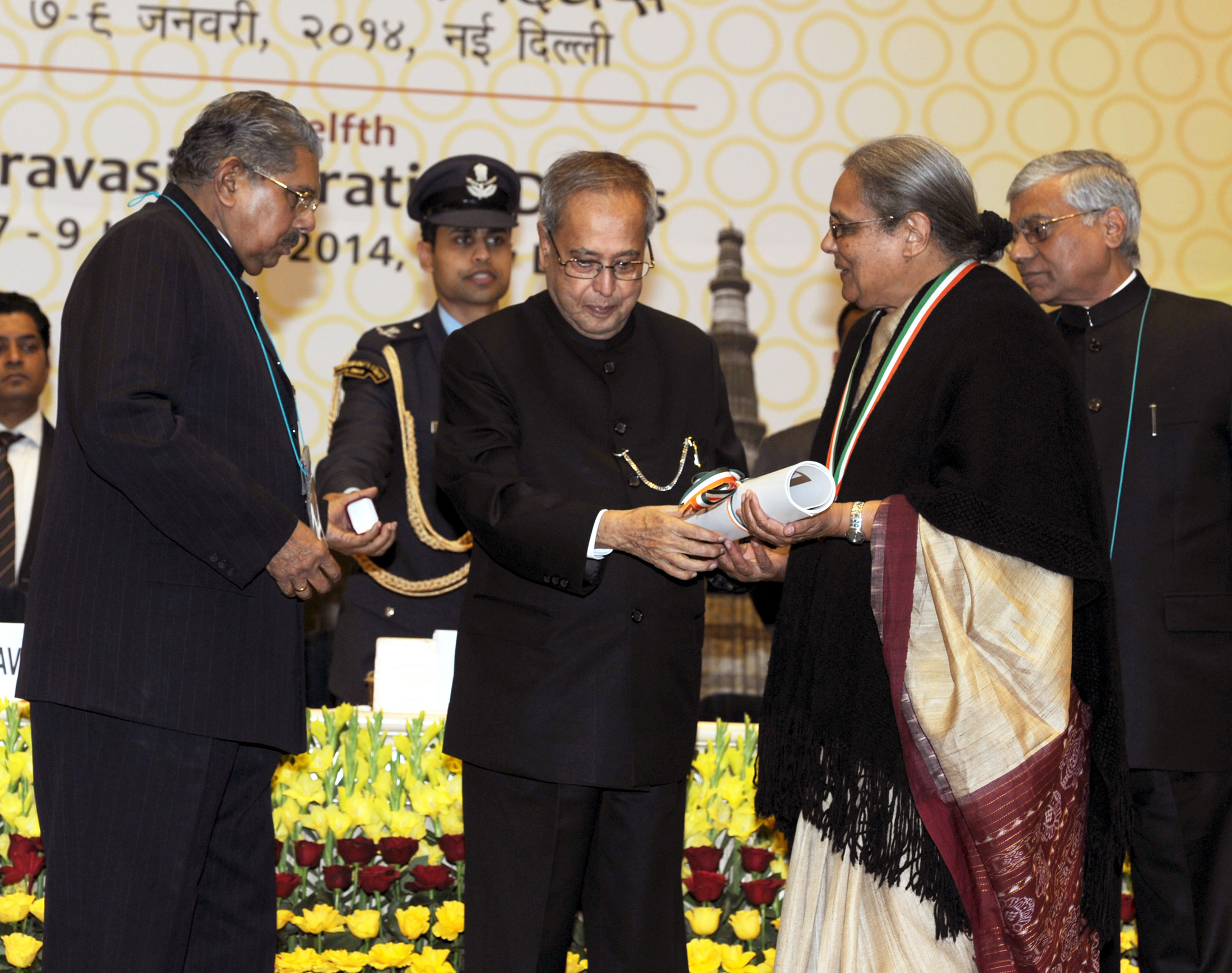
Ela Gandhi receives Pravasi Bharatiya Samman from President of India in 2014

In 2002, Gandhi received the Community of Christ International Peace Award. Five years later, she was awarded conferred the Padma Bhushan by the Government of India. In 2014, she was also honoured as a veteran of the Umkhonto we Sizwe. The Embassy of India Student Hub, Washington, D.C., invited Ela Gandhi to speak to over 15,000 graduating students in the Class of 2020 during a virtual graduation ceremony.

== See also ==
- List of people subject to banning orders under apartheid
