= Ramdas Gandhi =

Son of Mahatma Gandhi

- Born: Ramdas Mohandas Gandhi; 4 May 1897; Colony of Natal
- Died: 14 April 1969 (aged 71); Pune, Maharashtra, India
- Spouse: Nirmala
- Children: 3, including Kanu, Sumitra
- Parents: Mahatma Gandhi (father); Kasturba Gandhi (mother)
- Relatives: Harilal, Manilal, Devdas (brothers)

Ramdas Mohandas Gandhi (4 May 1897 – 14 April 1969) was the third son of Mahatma Gandhi. He was a freedom activist in his own right.

== Biography ==
Ramdas was born in the British Colony of Natal, the third son of Mahatma Gandhi and Kasturba Gandhi. He had two older brothers, Harilal and Manilal, and one younger brother, Devdas Gandhi.

He was married to Nirmala Gandhi, and they had three children, including Kanu Gandhi and Sumitra Kulkarni.

Raised in South Africa on one of his father's ashram-farms, Ramdas would, as an adult, tend to deprecate the idealistic poverty imposed by his father on all his associates. He had no taste for asceticism and considered that his father's lifestyle was nothing more than a personal fetish which caused inconvenience to others, including the Gandhi family.

Nevertheless, he was a passionate nationalist and freedom fighter, and an active participant in the grueling civil protests of the 1930s which his father led. He was imprisoned numerous times by the British, and these prolonged stints in jail had serious effects on his health.

At his father's funeral, Ramdas Gandhi was the one who lit the funeral pyre, as he had desired. He was joined by his younger brother Devdas Gandhi at the funeral.

He died in 1969, aged 72.
