= Shanti Gandhi =

American politician (born 1940)

Member of the Kansas House of Representatives from the 52nd district
- In office 14 January 2013 – 12 January 2015
- Preceded by: Lana Gordon
- Succeeded by: Dick Jones

Personal details
- Born: 10 February 1940 (age 86)
- Party: Republican
- Spouse: Susan Gandhi
- Relations: Mahatma Gandhi (great-grandfather); Harilal Gandhi (grandfather)
- Children: Ann Gandhi, Alka Gandhi, Anita Gandhi, Anjali Gandhi
- Parent(s): Kantilal Gandhi (father), Saraswati Gandhi (mother)
- Education: University of Bombay
- Profession: Retired cardiovascular physician

Shanti Gandhi (born 10 February 1940) is an Indian-born American cardiovascular and thoracic surgeon and was a Republican member of the Kansas House of Representatives, representing the 52nd District from 2013 to 2015. He won a contested party primary and won again in the 2012 general election. Gandhi did not run in the 2014 primary and was succeeded after one term by fellow Republican Dick Jones.

He arrived in the U.S. in 1967 as a medical graduate from University of Bombay. Shanti is the son of Kantilal Gandhi and Saraswati Gandhi, grandson of Harilal Gandhi and Gulab Gandhi, and a great-grandson of the Indian Independence movement leader Mahatma Gandhi. He retired as a cardiovascular and thoracic surgeon from Stormont–Vail Hospital at Topeka, Kansas in 2010.

At his request, the news media did not mention his ancestry to Mahatma Gandhi during the 2012 campaign. Gandhi later said he was surprised the media honored his request. Gandhi said he simply wanted to be known as a heart surgeon, father and friend to many; he did not want to win election from the name recognition of being a descendant of the famous Indian leader.

Gandhi came to the U.S. soon after graduating from the University of Bombay, to serve as an intern at a Youngstown, Ohio hospital, at a time when heart surgery was in its infancy. His father had encouraged him to take the internship. Lacking money for travel, the hospital loaned him the money for airfare. He met his wife, Susan, at the hospital, where she was a registered nurse. He became a naturalized U.S. citizen in 1975, and started St. Francis Hospital's heart surgery program after being invited by the Topeka hospital in 1978.

== Committee membership ==
- Education
- Federal and State Affairs
- Social Services Budget

== Elections ==
=== 2012 ===
Gandhi defeated William Scott Hesse and Dick Jones in a three-way Republican primary on 7 August 2012, and defeated Democratic nominee Theodore "Ted" Ensley in the general election on 6 November 2012, by a margin of 6,472 to 5,425.
