= Christopher Gandy (cricketer) =

English cricketer

Personal information
- Full name: Christopher Henry Gandy
- Born: 24 June 1867; Bethnal Green, Middlesex, England
- Died: 18 June 1907 (aged 39); Ingrave, Essex, England
- Batting: Left-handed
- Bowling: Left-arm fast-medium

Domestic team information
- Years: Team
- 1900: Hampshire

Career statistics
Competition	First-class
Matches	2
Runs scored	6
Batting average	2.00
100s/50s	–/–
Top score	6*
Balls bowled	174
Wickets	3
Bowling average	39.00
5 wickets in innings	–
10 wickets in match	–
Best bowling	2/84
Catches/stumpings	1/–
- Source: Cricinfo, 2 January 2009

Christopher Henry Gandy (24 June 1867 — 18 June 1907) was an English first-class cricketer.

Gandy was born in Bethnal Green in June 1967. A left-arm fast-medium bowler, he was one of eighteen players used by Hampshire in first-class cricket during the 1900 season. Gandy made two appearances in the 1900 County Championship, against Surrey at The Oval and Somerset at Bath. In these, he took three wickets at an average of exactly 39, with best figures of 2 for 84. Gandy died on 18 June 1907 in Ingrave, Essex.
