= Putlibai (dacoit) =

Indian female dacoit

The Putli Bai (Hindi: पुतली बाई) (1926 or 1929 - 1958) was a dreaded female dacoit, often known by the epithet "Indian Bandit Queen". She was the first female dacoit of India. Her area of dacoity was the famed Chambal valley, which remained for a long time a stronghold of dacoits. Supposedly, she never wanted to be a dacoit, but became so because of excessive cruelty meted out upon her time and again, and dacoity - kind of - became her last resort.

She was born as Gauhar Bano in a small village in Morena district of Madhya Pradesh. Gradually as she became famous in the world of dancing, she began to be called Putlibai. The name appears to be a reference to a typical Indian puppet, who is made to dance by a hidden artist. Another conjecture is that she used to slither as smoothly as the pupils of an eye, and hence the name.

== Kidnap ==
Sultana who had zero respect for women had seen Putli dance in Agra and had fallen in love with her or so he thought he did. According to Sultana, women represent evil temptation and could bring bad luck but the thought of Putlibai in contact without anyone else other than him had swept him over. Having heard of the wedding in Dholpur, he had decided to kidnap her. Their relationship was never peaceful, and although Putli escaped on at least two occasions, she eventually chose to return, bored and violated by the life she was offered under her mother's guidance (her mother's brothel). Gradually she fell in love with him.

== Tanno ==
During their time together, they had a child. Putlibai named her Tanno and within months had her sent to Ashgari in Agra, unable to cope with a child in the ravines.

== The end of Sultana ==
Putlibai had a daughter Tanno with Sultana. Over time Sultana included a dreaded dacoit Lakhan in his gang. On May 25, 1955, police ambushed Sultana and killed him. It was at least the claim of the police. However, as Putlibai was living with Sultana, she knew for sure, that Sultana was actually assassinated by a dacoit Kalla [another member of the gang], on the orders of Lakhan. She was so upset at Police false claims, that she is said to have even written a letter to the then Prime Minister of India Jawaharlal Nehru stating how the police under his rule had been claiming false laurels.

== Life after Sultan's death ==
After Sultan's death, Putlibai joined up with Kalyan Singh, alias Kalla, to whom she had always been attracted. The Kalla-Putli gang became one of the most feared and hunted of all gangs operating in Chambal Valley in the 1950s, second only to the gang of Mansingh. Eventually, Putlibai started to be known as the 'Bandit Queen,' people started to call her a living legend. Stories of her exploits were told and retold, songs were written about her life, and villagers who claimed to have seen her took pride in describing every little detail they could remember of their encounter with the "reincarnation of Kali."

== Death ==
After Putli was injured in a gun battle with the police one day, her left arm was amputated at the elbow by a village doctor. During the period of her recovery, Kalla assured that on each raid one of his men could be dressed as a woman, in a sari, in order to flout police rumors that she had been killed. Newspaper reports stated there had been a long trail of blood which made it unlikely that she had survived. The constable who claimed to have shot her was on the verge of being promoted and decorated. A few months later., Putli was seen in villages again, wielding a rifle, held steady with her left arm, her aim still accurate. A police constable, injured in a gun battle, stated that he had been shot by Putli, whom he recognized, and added that she had lost half her left arm. confirming the rumor that she has been alive.

On January 23, 1958, Bai was killed by police in an encounter. She has been shot dead, trying to escape a police ambush by crossing the Kunwari River, which runs parallel to the Chambal. She was only twenty-nine and her body was dragged to the left bank of the river.

== In popular culture ==
Putlibai, because of her beauty, courage, and rebellion against the establishment, became a kind of semi-legend. Two Hindi films were made on her life.

- Putlibai (1972 film), starring Sujit Kumar, and Jaya Mala
- Putlibai (1999 film), starring Raj Kiran
