= Arun Manilal Gandhi =

Indian-American social activist (1934–2023)

Arun Gandhi
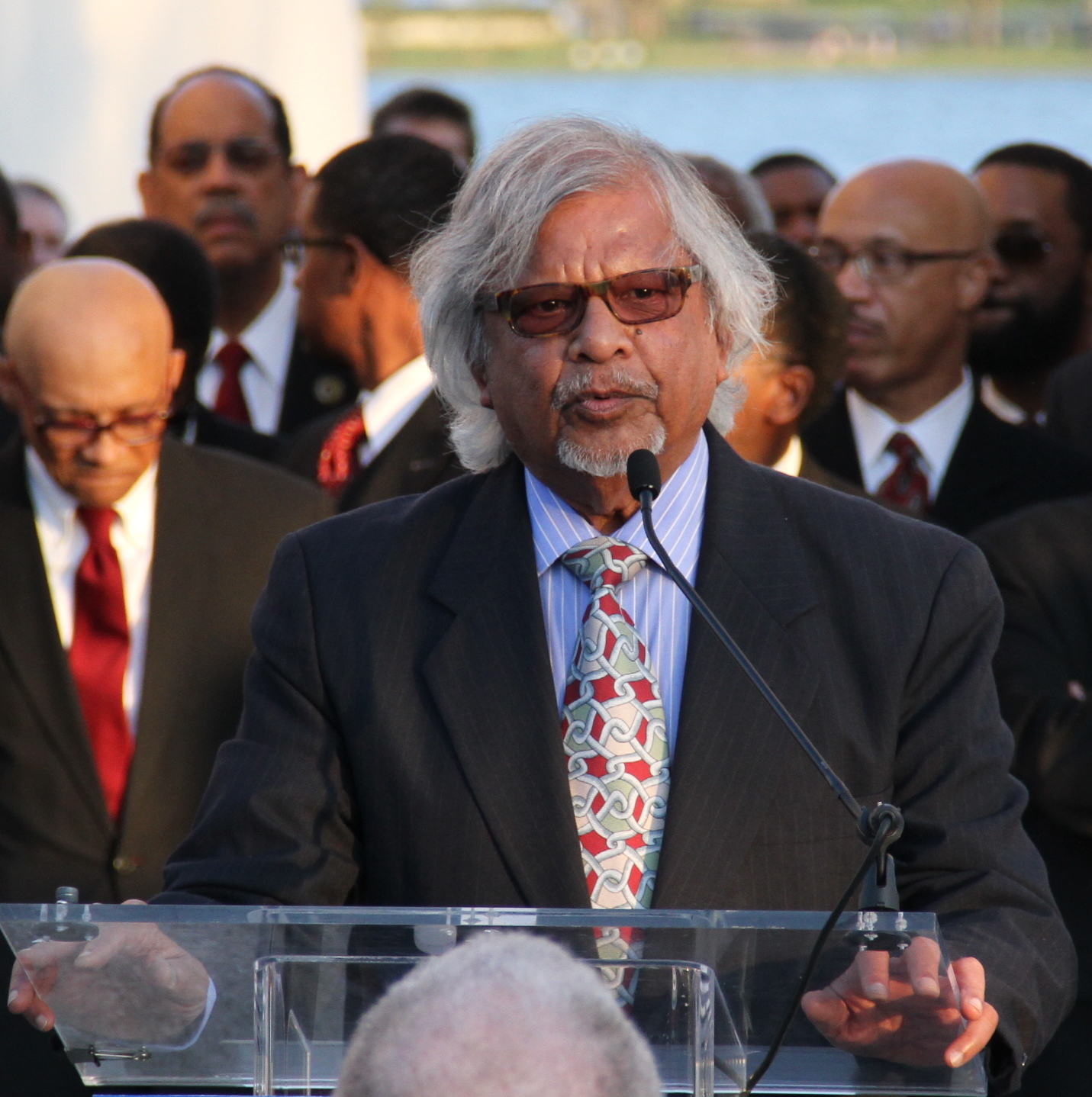
- Gandhi in 2012
- Born: Arun Manilal Gandhi; 14 April 1934; Durban, Natal Province, South Africa
- Died: 2 May 2023 (aged 89); Kolhapur, Maharashtra, India
- Citizenship: American
- Spouse: Sunanda Gandhi (m. 1957; died 2007)
- Children: 2, including Tushar
- Parent(s): Manilal Gandhi; Sushila Mashruwala
- Relatives: Ela Gandhi (sister); Mahatma Gandhi (grandfather); Kasturba Gandhi (grandmother)

Arun Manilal Gandhi (14 April 1934 – 2 May 2023) was a South African–American author, socio-political activist, and son of Manilal Gandhi, thus a grandson of Indian independence leader Mahatma Gandhi. In 2017, he published The Gift of Anger: And Other Lessons From My Grandfather Mahatma Gandhi (New York: Gallery Books/Jeter Publishing 2017).

Arun Gandhi criticized the Indian government in an article he wrote after they subsidized a 1982 film based on his grandfather's life with $25 million. He immigrated to the United States with his family in 1987, and studied at the University of Mississippi. They later moved to Memphis, Tennessee, where they founded the M. K. Gandhi Institute for Nonviolence, hosted by the Christian Brothers University.

== Early life ==
Arun Manilal Gandhi was born on 14 April 1934, in Durban, to Manilal Gandhi and Sushila Mashruwala. His father was an editor and his mother was a publisher for the Indian Opinion. Arun had seen his grandfather Mahatma Gandhi once briefly at age 5 and didn't see him again until 1946 when he lived with Mahatma Gandhi at the Sevagram ashram in India. Arun returned to the Union of South Africa in 1947, just weeks before his grandfather was assassinated.

While living at Sevagram, Arun had the advantage of education over the illiterate farm families who worked the surrounding fields. His grandfather urged him to play with the neighboring children after school in order to "learn what it was like to live in poverty", as well as to teach those children what he learned in class each day, which Arun Gandhi later described as "the most creative and enlightening experience for me." Eventually, crowds of children and their parents started showing up for lessons with the young Gandhi, which taught him compassion and the need to share.

== Career ==
In 1982, when Columbia Pictures released the feature film, Gandhi, based on his grandfather's life, Gandhi wrote an article criticizing the Indian government for subsidizing the film with $25 million, arguing that there were more important things to spend such money on. Though his article was widely reprinted and celebrated, after attending a special screening of the film, Gandhi included that it accurately conveyed his grandfather's philosophy and legacy (despite its historical inaccuracies), and was so moved by it that he wrote another article retracting the first one.

In 1987, Arun Gandhi moved to the United States along with his wife, Sunanda, to work on a study at the University of Mississippi. This study examined and contrasted the sorts of prejudices that existed in India, the U.S., and South Africa. Afterward, they moved to Memphis, Tennessee, and founded the M. K. Gandhi Institute for Nonviolence hosted by the Christian Brothers University, a Catholic academic institution. This institute was dedicated to applying the principles of nonviolence at both local and global scales. As co-founders of the institute, both husband and wife received the Peace Abbey Courage of Conscience Award "for bringing the legacy of Gandhi to America" which was awarded at the John F. Kennedy Library in Boston. In 1996, he cofounded the Season for Nonviolence as a yearly celebration of the philosophies and lives of Mohandas Gandhi and Martin Luther King Jr.

In 2003, Gandhi was one of the signatories to Humanism and Its Aspirations (Humanist Manifesto III). In late 2007, Gandhi co-taught a course entitled "Gandhi on Personal Leadership and Nonviolence" at Salisbury University in Salisbury, Maryland. On 12 November 2007, Gandhi gave a lecture for the Salisbury University Center for Conflict Resolution's "One Person Can Make a Difference" Lecture Series, entitled "Nonviolence in the Age of Terrorism". In late 2008, Gandhi returned to Salisbury University to co-teach a course entitled "The Global Impact of Gandhi".

In 2007, after the passing of his wife Sunanda Gandhi on 21 February, the Nonviolence institute moved to Rochester, New York, and is currently located on the University of Rochester River Campus. After January 2008 op-ed in The Washington Post's "On Faith" section where Gandhi said that Israelis talked too much about the Holocaust and were losing world sympathy and that Israel and the U.S. were the biggest contributors to the world-threatening "culture of violence", his ties to Rochester were imperiled. Gandhi delivered an apology by saying he had only meant to say right-wing Likud supporters were going to destroy the world; the university responded that his response was not accepted and gave him two options: resign from the institute and leave it running under new leadership, or refuse to leave and see both his outright firing and the institute being shut down and thrown off campus. Gandhi said later he chose the former option to save the center, and inaccurately speculated that he would return to lead it when the furor over his actions died down in the future (he never returned to the UoR in any official capacity before his death).

Gandhi had given many speeches about nonviolence in many countries. During his tour to Israel, he urged the Palestinian people to resist Israeli occupation peacefully to assure their freedom. In August 2004, Gandhi proposed to the Palestinian Parliament a peaceful march of 50,000 refugees across the Jordan River to return to their homeland and said MPs should lead the way. Gandhi also claimed that the fate of Palestinians is ten times worse than that of black people in apartheid South Africa. He asked: "What would happen? Maybe the Israeli army would shoot and kill several. They may kill 100. They may kill 200 men, women and children. And that would shock the world. The world will get up and say, 'What is going on?'."

On 12 October 2009 Gandhi visited the Brunton Theatre in Musselburgh to talk to P7's from all over East Lothian in Scotland. On 11 November 2009 Gandhi visited Chattanooga State Technical Community College in Chattanooga, Tennessee, to speak and spread his message of peace. On 13 November 2009, Gandhi visited Cleveland State Community College in Cleveland, Tennessee, to speak and spread his message of peace. On 16 November 2010, Gandhi visited The University of Wyoming in Laramie, Wyoming, to speak and spread his message of peace.

On 2 March 2011, Arun Gandhi spoke at the East West Center on the campus of the University of Hawaii at Manoa, Honolulu, in Hawaii, where he delivered the speech "Nonviolence: A Means for Social Change". On the same day, he also spoke at Iolani School in Honolulu, where he delivered the speech "The Wisdom of Choosing Peace". On 3 March 2011, Gandhi spoke at the University of Hawaii Architecture Building, in an event sponsored by the Spark Matsunaga Institute for Peace and Conflict Resolution in Honolulu, Hawaii. On 4 March 2011 spoke at the Pacific Buddhist Academy in Honolulu, Hawaii. He also spoke at the Hawaii State Capitol (public auditorium) on the subject of "The Power of Peace to Create a Culture of Human Rights in Hawaii and the World". This was part of the Human Rights Week, sponsored by the State of Hawaii. He also spoke at the Pioneer Plaza Club in downtown Honolulu on the subject of "Gandhian Peace (Nonviolence) A Pathway for Resolving Modern Day Conflict". On 5 March 2011, Gandhi visited The International Society for Krishna Consciousness Temple in Honolulu, Hawaii, to speak and spread his message of peace. He also spoke at To Ho No Hikari Church in Honolulu, in an event sponsored by Dr. Terry Shintani, on the subject of "The Way of Nonviolence Towards All Living Beings", and at the Hawaii Convention Center as part of the PAAAC Youth Conference. On 6 March 2011 Gandhi spoke at Unity Church, Diamond Head, Honolulu, on the subject of "Lessons I Learned With My Grandfather".

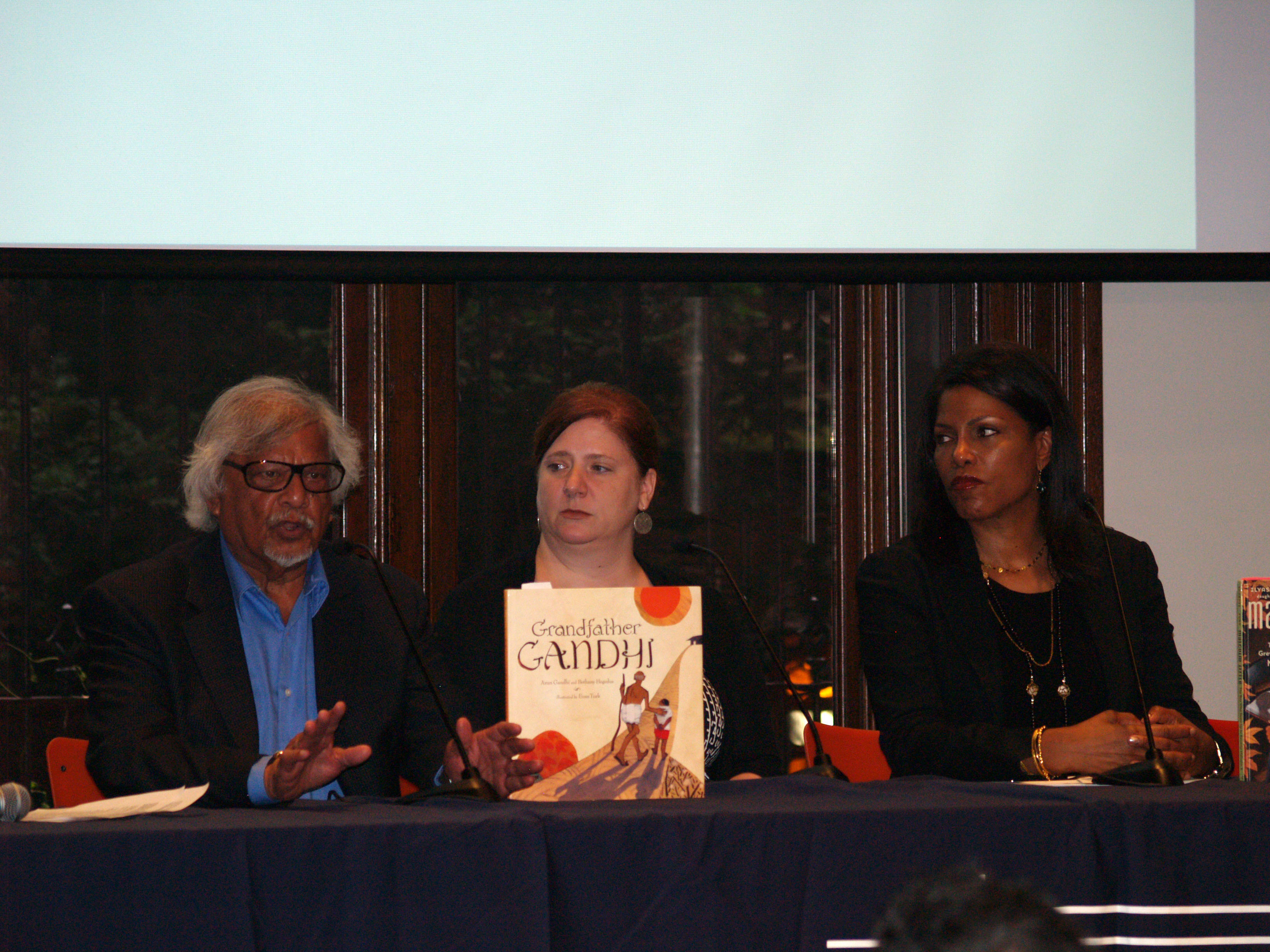
From left to right: Gandhi, his Grandfather Gandhi co-author Bethany Hegedus, and Ilyasah Shabazz, daughter of Malcolm X, speaking on the "Peace: The Next Generation" panel at the 2014 Brooklyn Book Festival on the topic of growing up a child of a political figure

Gandhi's 2011 tour of Honolulu was sponsored by Barbara Altemus of the We Are One Foundation and by the Gandhian International Institute for Peace. Gandhi is featured in "THE CALLING: Heal Ourselves Heal our Planet" a Documentary Film in Production created by Barbara Altemus, directed by Oscar-nominated William Gazecki.

On 23 March 2012, Gandhi was the keynote speaker at the first annual Engaging Peace Conference at Arcadia University in Glenside, Pennsylvania.

In March 2014, Atheneum Books for Young Readers published Grandfather Gandhi, a children's book that Arun Gandhi co-authored with Bethany Hegedus, and illustrated by Evan Turk. The picture book memoir, which carries a pro-peace message, tells the story of how Arun's grandfather, likening anger to lightning that could either destroy or illuminate, taught Arun to respond to injustice using peaceful methods, in order to "turn darkness into light". The book also focuses on how Arun, jealous of the other people who commanded his grandfather's attention, frustrated with his schoolwork, and embarrassed at his inability to control his anger, strove to make his grandfather proud. The book was met with positive reviews for its use of a child's point of view in order to make a complex historical issue understandable to child readers, and for Turk's use of cut-paper abstract images to create illustrations with emotional resonance. He also published Legacy of Love: My Education in the Path of Nonviolence.

== Personal life and death ==
Gandhi considered himself to be a Hindu and expressed universalist views. Like his grandfather, he also believed in applying the principle of nonviolence (Ahimsa) as a means to resolve political and social conflicts in the modern world.

Gandhi met nurse Sunanda in a hospital and they married in 1957. The couple had 2 children, Tushar, born on 17 January 1960, and Archana. Gandhi and Sunanda stayed married until her death on 21 February 2007.

As of 2016, Gandhi resided in Rochester, New York. Gandhi died at the Sunanda Gandhi Home for Girls in Kolhapur, Maharashtra on 2 May 2023.

== See also ==
- Ahimsa
- Anti-war movement
- Hinduism in South Africa
- Hinduism in the United States
- Humanist Manifesto
- Indian independence movement
- List of peace activists
