= Karamchand Gandhi =

Father of Mahatma Gandhi (1822–1885)

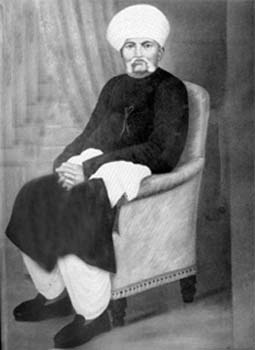
- Karamchand Gandhi in 1880

Diwan of Porbandar
- In office 1847–1874
- Monarch: Vikramatji Khimojiraj
- Preceded by: Uttamchand Gandhi
- Succeeded by: Tulsidas Gandhi

Governor of Porbandar
- In office 1874–1885
- Monarch: Bawajiraj Mehrmansinhji

Personal details
- Born: 1822 Porbandar, Porbandar State, Company India
- Died: 16 November 1885 (aged 63) Rajkot, Rajkot State, British India
- Spouse: Putlibai Gandhi (m. 1857)
- Children: Laxmidas; Karsandas; Raliatbehn; Mahatma Gandhi
- Parents: Uttamchand Gandhi (father); Laxmiba Gandhi (mother)

Karamchand Uttamchand "Kaba" Gandhi (1822 – 16 November 1885) was a court official in Porbandar. He served as Diwan of Porbandar and Rajkot and was the father of Mahatma Gandhi.

== Life ==
The Gandhi family originated from the village of Kutiana in what was then Junagadh State. In the early 18th century, Lalji Gandhi moved to Porbandar and entered the service of its ruler, the Rana. Successive generations of the family served as civil servants in the state administration before Uttamchand, Karamchand's father, became diwan in the early 19th century under the then Rana of Porbandar, Khimojiraj. In 1831, Rana Khimojiraj died suddenly and was succeeded by his 12-year-old only son, Vikmatji. As a result, Rana Khimojiraj's widow, Rani Rupaliba, became regent for her son. She soon fell out with Uttamchand and forced him to return to his ancestral village in Junagadh. While in Junagadh, Uttamchand appeared before its Nawab and saluted him with his left hand instead of his right, replying that his right hand was pledged to Porbandar's service. In 1841, Vikmatji assumed the throne and reinstated Uttamchand as his diwan.

Like his father, Ananyachand Gandhi, Karamchand had become a court official, or chief minister, of the local ruling prince of Porbandar. Karamchand's duties included advising the royal family of Porbandar and hiring other government officials.

Karamchand had very little formal education, but his practical knowledge and experience made him a good administrator. He was said to be kind and generous, but also to have a bad temper. There were some areas, however, in which he never gained much knowledge, including geography and history. Nonetheless, Karamchand excelled as chief minister in Porbandar.

In spite of Karamchand's success in his job, he did not find ways to accumulate wealth. The Gandhis had plenty to eat, a respectable number of servants, and a few nice pieces of furniture, but they were by no means wealthy. The money Karamchand brought in just covered the household expenses.

Karamchand married four times. His first three marriages ended with the deaths of his wives; among which two died immediately after giving birth to two daughters. He later married Putlibai Gandhi (1844 — 12 June 1891) in 1857, and their marriage lasted until his death in 1885. This marriage produced four children - three sons including Laxmidas Gandhi (1860 — 9 March 1914), Karsandas Gandhi (1866 — 22 June 1913) & Mohandas Gandhi (2 October 1869 — 30 January 1948) and a daughter named Raliatbehn (1862 — December 1960). Mohandas Gandhi was his youngest child. All his children got married during his lifetime.

In 1885, Karamchand suffered a serious attack of fistula. Putlibai and her children (especially Mohandas) took care of him. His condition began to deteriorate day by day, and although doctors attempted many different types of treatment, it was to no avail. He later suggested a surgery for that, but his family doctor refused to do so. Karamchand's condition continued to deteriorate further until, finally, he died on 16 November aged 63. As his son Mohandas (Mahatma Gandhi) would later recall the events of that night:

"That night (of 16th November), his uncle Tulsidas (Karamchand's younger brother) came to their home. Though death was imminent, no one accepted the fact that it would be his (Karamchand's) last night. When Tulsidas used to come to visit his ailing elder brother, he would sit behind him during day. That night, around 10:30 or 11, when then 16-year old Mohandas was massaging his father's legs, Tulsidas came there and told him to go. He happily went to his bed, where his wife Kasturba was sleeping. Within seconds, their servant called him and told that Karamchand's condition was serious. But as everyone had already realized that his condition was serious, they realized that he had died."
