= Putlibai Gandhi =

Mahatma Gandhi's mother

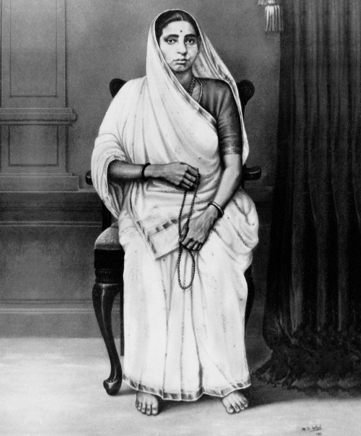
- Born: 1844; Datrana, Junagadh State, Company India
- Died: 12 June 1891 (aged 46–47)
- Known for: Being the mother of Mahatma Gandhi
- Spouse: Karamchand Gandhi (m. 1857)
- Children: Laxmidas; Karsandas; Raliatbehn; Mohandas

Putlibai Karamchand Gandhi (1844 – 12 June 1891) was the mother of Indian independence leader Mahatma Gandhi.

She came from a village called Dantrana of the then-Junagadh State.

She was the 4th, and youngest, wife of the former Rajkot Dewan Karamchand Gandhi. She was twenty-two years younger than Karamchand who she had married after his first two wives had died early in childbirth and the third was rendered childless. She bore four children to Karamchand Gandhi, Mohandas was her youngest son, who she affectionately called Monia.

She was a very religious woman, and practiced Hinduism by whom Mahatma Gandhi was schooled about his religion. Mahatma Gandhi wrote extensively about his mother and her conditions for him leaving India for England to pursue his education to become a barrister in his autobiography The Story of My Experiments with Truth.
