= Ramchandra Gandhi =

Indian philosopher

Ramchandra Gandhi (9 June 1937 – 13 June 2007) was an Indian philosopher. He was a grandson of Mahatma Gandhi. He was the son of Devdas Gandhi and Lakshmi (daughter of Rajaji), and brother of Rajmohan Gandhi and Gopalkrishna Gandhi.

Ramchandra Gandhi obtained his doctoral degree in philosophy from Oxford where he was a student of Peter Strawson. He founded the philosophy department at the University of Hyderabad. He also taught at Visva-Bharati University, Panjab University, Bangalore University, and California Institute of Integral Studies in San Francisco, California. He died at the India International Centre on 13 June 2007, four days after his 70th birthday.

He was a friend of the philosopher K. J. Shah.

== Bibliography ==
- The Availability of Religious Ideas (1976)
- I Am Thou: Meditations on the Truth of India (1984)
- Sita's Kitchen: A Testimony of Faith and Inquiry (1992)
- Svaraj: A Journey with Tyeb Mehta's Shantiniketan Triptych (2003)
- Muniya's Light: A Narrative of Truth and Myth (2005)
