= Manilal Gandhi =

Son of Mahatma Gandhi

- Born: 28 October 1892; Rajkot, Rajkot State, British India
- Died: 5 April 1956 (aged 63); Phoenix, Natal Province, South Africa
- Spouse: Sushila Mashruwala (1927–1956)
- Children: Sita; Arun; Ela
- Parent(s): Mahatma Gandhi; Kasturba Gandhi

Manilal Mohandas Gandhi (28 October 1892 – 5 April 1956) was the second son of Mahatma Gandhi and Kasturba Gandhi.

== Biography ==
Manilal was born in Rajkot, British India, the second of four sons of Mohandas Gandhi and Kasturba Gandhi. He had an older brother, Harilal, and two younger brothers, Ramdas and Devdas.

Manilal's early years were spent in Rajkot, and it was in 1897 that he traveled to South Africa for the first time (his father having moved there several years previously). The family lived for a time in Durban and Johannesburg. Between 1906 and 1914, he lived at the Phoenix Settlement (in KwaZulu-Natal) and Tolstoy Farm (in Gauteng), both settlements established by his father.

After a brief visit to India (accompanying his parents), Manilal returned to South Africa in 1917 to assist in printing the Indian Opinion, a Gujarati-English weekly publication, at Phoenix, Durban. By 1918, Manilal was doing most of the work for the press, and in 1920, he took over as editor. He remained editor of Indian Opinion until 1956, the year of his death. Manilal died from a cerebral thrombosis following a stroke.

Like his father, Manilal was also sent to prison several times by the British colonial government after protesting against what he perceived as unjust laws. He was one of the initial 78 marchers to accompany Gandhi on the 1930 Salt March, for which he was imprisoned.

== Personal life ==
In 1926, Manilal informed his father Mahatma Gandhi about Fatima Gool, with whom he had fallen in love in South Africa. Fatima was a Muslim of Gujrati descent. But Gandhi conveyed his disagreement because of the different religions of the two and wrote:

If you stick to Hinduism and Fatima follows Islam it will be like putting two swords in one sheath; or you both may lose your faith. And then what should be your children's faith? ... It is not dharma, only adharma if Fatima agrees to conversion just for marrying you. Faith is not a thing like a garment which can be changed to suit our convenience.

In 1927, Manilal married Sushila (24 August 1907 – 1988), a woman from his own community and similar background, in a match arranged by their families in the usual Indian way. Sushila was the daughter of Nanabhai Mashruwala of Akola, Bombay State, and the niece of Kishorlal Mashruwala, a close associate of Gandhi and a resident of Sevagram ashram. It was Mahatma Gandhi who sought her hand for his second son; the match was arranged, and after the wedding, Sushila duly joined her husband in South Africa. They had three children:

- Sita Dhupelia (1928-1999), elder daughter
- Arun Manilal Gandhi (1934–2023), son
- Ela Gandhi Ramgobin (b. 1940), younger daughter

== Legacy ==
Manilal's children Arun and Ela were also social-political activists. Uma D. Mesthrie, Sita's daughter, published a biography on Manilal.

== Notes ==
- Mesthrie, Uma Dhupelia. Gandhi's Prisoner? The Life of Gandhi's Son Manilal. Permanent Black: Cape Town, South Africa, 2003.
- Dhupelia-Mesthrie, Uma, "Writing the Life of Manilal Mohandas Gandhi," Journal of Natal and Zulu History 24 & 25 (2006-2007): 188-213.
