= Devdas Gandhi =

Son of Mahatma Gandhi and Indian activist

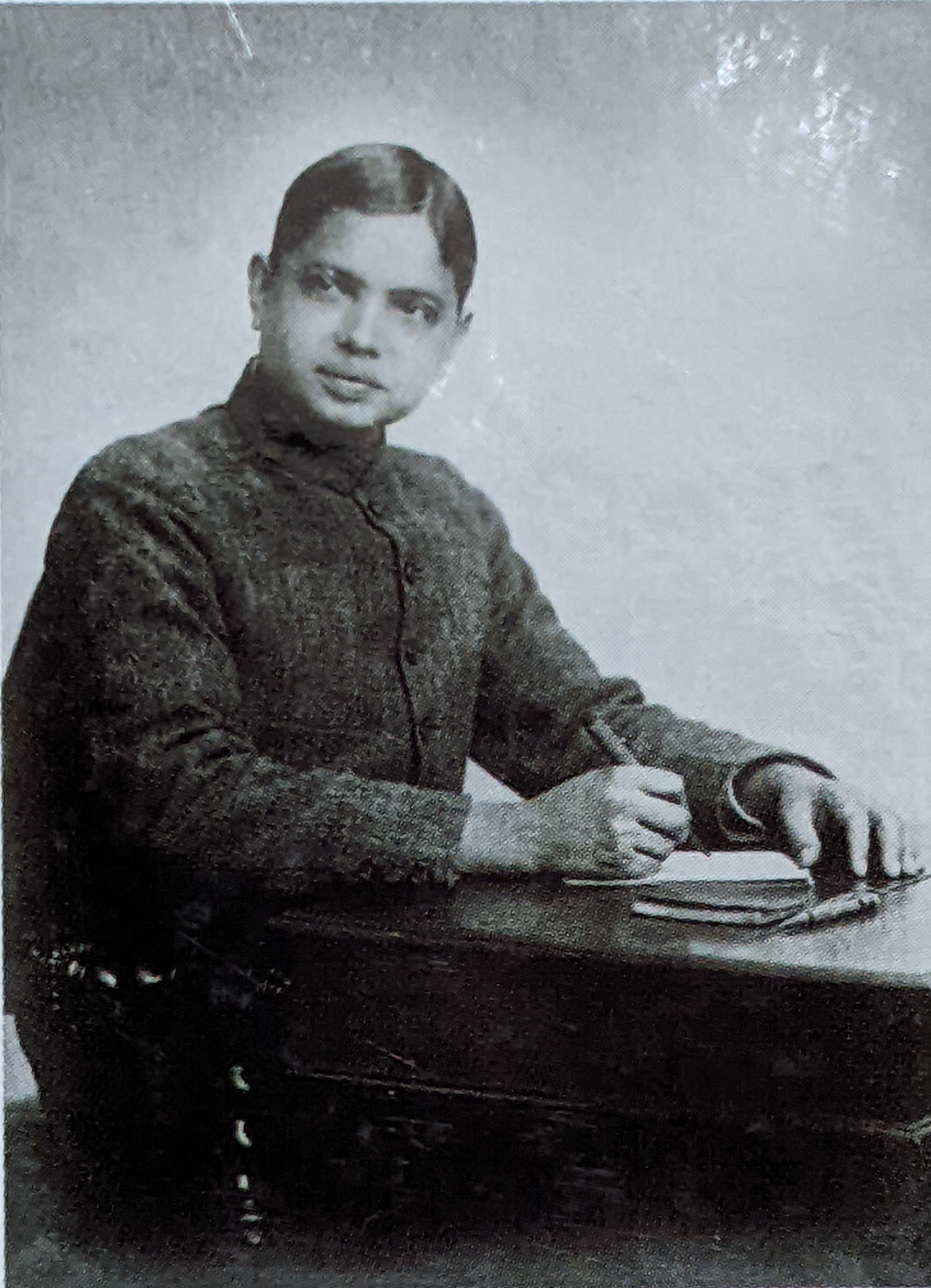
- Devdas Gandhi in 1931
- Born: Devdas Mohandas Gandhi; 22 May 1900; Colony of Natal
- Died: 3 August 1957 (aged 57); Bombay, Bombay State, India
- Spouse: Lakshmi Chakravarti
- Children: 4, including Rajmohan, Ramchandra, and Gopalkrishna
- Parents: Mohandas Karamchand Gandhi; Kasturba Gandhi
- Relatives: C. Rajagopalachari (father-in-law); C. R. Narasimhan (brother-in-law)

Devdas Mohandas Gandhi (22 May 1900 – 3 August 1957) was the fourth and youngest son of Mahatma Gandhi and Kasturba Gandhi. He was born in the Colony of Natal and came to India with his parents as a grown man. He became active in his father's movement, spending many terms in jail. He also became a prominent journalist, serving as editor of Hindustan Times. He was also the first pracharak of the Dakshina Bharat Hindi Prachar Sabha (DBHPS), established by Mohandas Gandhi in Tamil Nadu in 1918. The purpose of the Sabha was to propagate Hindi in southern India.

== Family ==
Devdas fell in love with Lakshmi, the daughter of C. Rajagopalachari, Devdas's father's associate in the Indian independence struggle. Due to Lakshmi's age at that time – she was only 15 and Devdas was 28 – both Devdas's father and Rajaji asked the couple to wait for five years without seeing each other. After five years had passed, they were married with their fathers' permission in 1933.

Devdas and Lakshmi had four children including Rajmohan Gandhi, Gopalkrishna Gandhi and Ramchandra Gandhi.

== Legacy ==
When Mahatma Gandhi started seeking help for establishment of Jamia Millia Islamia, Devdas also came forward on the call of Gandhi. He started teaching Hindi there and also cotton spinning.
