= Kasturba Gandhi =

Wife of Mahatma Gandhi (1869–1944)

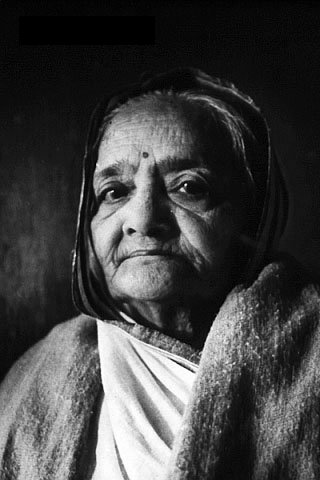
- Kasturba in 1940
- Born: Kasturba Gokuldas Kapadia; 11 April 1869; Porbandar, Kathiawar Agency, British Raj
- Died: 22 February 1944 (aged 74); Aga Khan Palace, Poona, Bombay Presidency, British India (now Pune, Maharashtra)
- Occupation: Activist
- Spouse: Mahatma Gandhi (m. 1883)
- Children: Harilal; Manilal; Ramdas; Devdas

Kasturba Mohandas Gandhi (Note: In this Indian name, Mohandas is a patronymic and the family name is Gandhi.) (born Kasturba Gokuldas Kapadia; 11 April 1869 – 22 February 1944) was an Indian political activist who was involved in the Indian independence movement during British India. She was married to Mohandas Karamchand Gandhi, commonly known as Mahatma Gandhi. National Safe Motherhood Day is observed in India annually on 11 April, coinciding with Kasturba's birthday.

== Early life and background ==
Kasturba was born on 11 April 1869 to Gokuladas and Vrajkunwerba Kapadia. The family belonged to the Modh Bania caste of Gujarati tradesmen and were based in the coastal town of Porbandar. In May 1883, 14-year-old Kasturba was married to 13-year-old Mohandas in a marriage arranged by their parents.

Recalling the day of their marriage, her husband once said, "As we didn't know much about marriage, for us it meant only wearing new clothes, eating sweets and playing with relatives." However, as was the prevailing tradition, the adolescent bride was to spend the first few years of marriage at her parents' house, and away from her husband. Writing many years later, Mohandas described with regret the lustful feelings he felt for his young bride, "even at school I used to think of her, and the thought of nightfall and our subsequent meeting was ever haunting me." At the beginning of their marriage, Mohandas was also possessive and manipulative; he wanted the ideal wife who would follow his command.

Kasturba became pregnant at the age of 17. The first child was born prematurely and did not survive the first year. Although their other four sons survived to adulthood, Kasturba never fully recovered from the death of her first child. Mohandas decided to go to London to study and departed in 1888, soon after their second child was born, a son named Harilal. Kasturba remained in India. Mohandas returned from London in 1891, and in 1892 Kasturba gave birth to another son, Manilal. Unable to find a successful career in India, Mohandas left for South Africa in 1893, once again leaving behind Kasturba and his children. In 1896 the family joined Mohandas in South Africa.

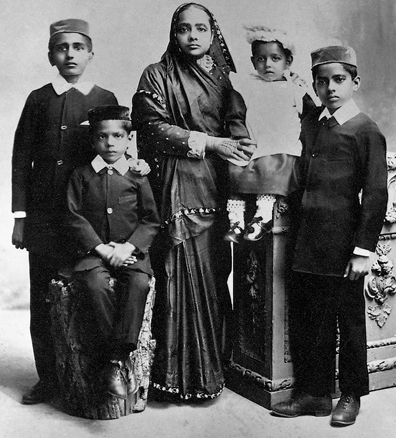
Kasturba with her four sons

In 1906, Mohandas took a vow of chastity, or brahamacharya. Some reports indicated that Kasturba felt that this opposed her role as a traditional Hindu wife. However, Kasturba quickly defended her marriage when a woman suggested she was unhappy. Kasturba's relatives also insisted that the greatest good was to remain and obey her husband, the Mahatma.

Ramachandra Guha's biography Gandhi Before India described the marriage, saying, "They had, in the emotional as well as sexual sense, always been true to one another. Perhaps because of their periodic, extended separations, Kasturba deeply cherished their time together."

== Political career ==
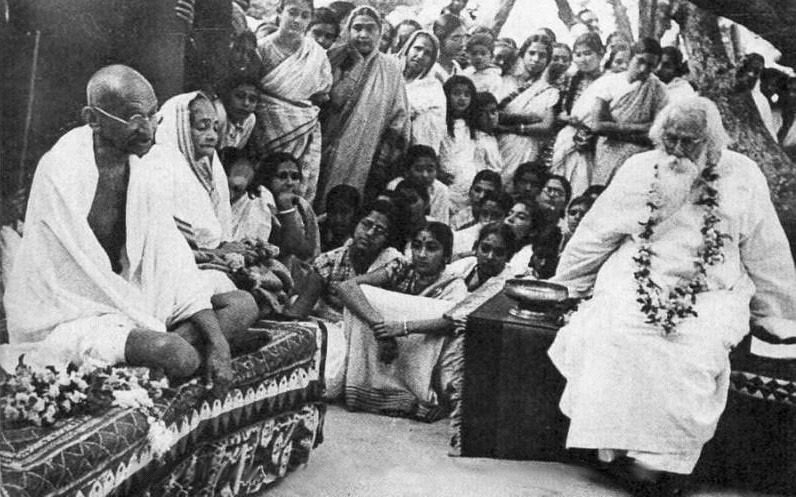
Bengali poet Rabindranath Tagore with Mahatma Gandhi and Kasturba Gandhi at Santiniketan, 1940.

Kasturba first involved herself with politics in South Africa in 1904 when, with her husband and others, she established the Phoenix Settlement near Durban. In 1913 she took part in protests against the ill-treatment of Indian immigrants in South Africa, for which she was arrested and sentenced to hard labour. While in prison, she led other women in prayer and encouraged the educated women to teach the uneducated women how to read and write.

The Gandhis left South Africa in July 1914 and returned to live in India. In spite of Kasturba’s chronic bronchitis she continued to take part in civil actions and protests across India and often took her husband's spot when he was in prison. The majority of her time was dedicated to serving in ashrams. Here, Kasturba was referred to as "Ba" or Mother, because she served as mother of the ashrams in India. A point of difference between Kasturba and Mohandas was the treatment of their children in their ashram. Mohandas believed that their sons did not deserve special treatment, while Kasturba felt that Mohandas neglected them.

In 1917, Kasturba worked for women's welfare in Champaran, Bihar where Mohandas was working with indigo farmers. She taught women hygiene, discipline, health, reading and writing. In 1922, she participated in a Satyagraha (nonviolent resistance) movement in Borsad, Gujarat even though she was in poor health. She did not take part in her husband's famous Salt March in 1930, but continued to take part in many civil disobedience campaigns and marches. As a result, she was arrested and jailed on numerous occasions.

In 1939, Kasturba took part in nonviolent protests against the British rule in Rajkot, after the women in the city specifically asked her to advocate for them. Kasturba was arrested once again, and kept in solitary confinement for a month. Her health worsened but she continued to fight for independence. In 1942, she was arrested again, along with Mohandas and other freedom fighters, for participating in the Quit India movement. She was imprisoned in the Aga Khan Palace in Pune. By this time her health had severely deteriorated and she died at the detention camp in Pune.

Mohandas wrote of his wife in terms which showed that he expected obedience from her. "According to my earlier experience, she was very obstinate. In spite of all my pressure she would do as she wished. This led to short or long periods of estrangement between us. But as my public life expanded, my wife bloomed forth and deliberately lost herself in my work."

== Health and death ==
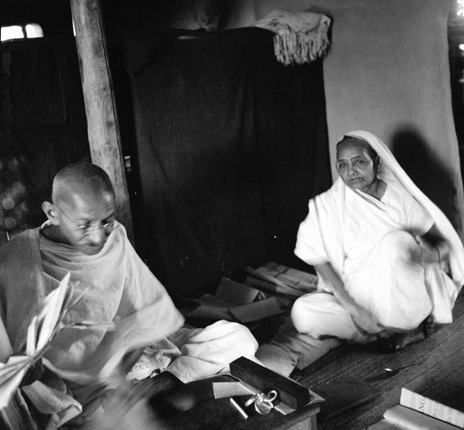
Kasturba (right), with Mohandas in the 1930s

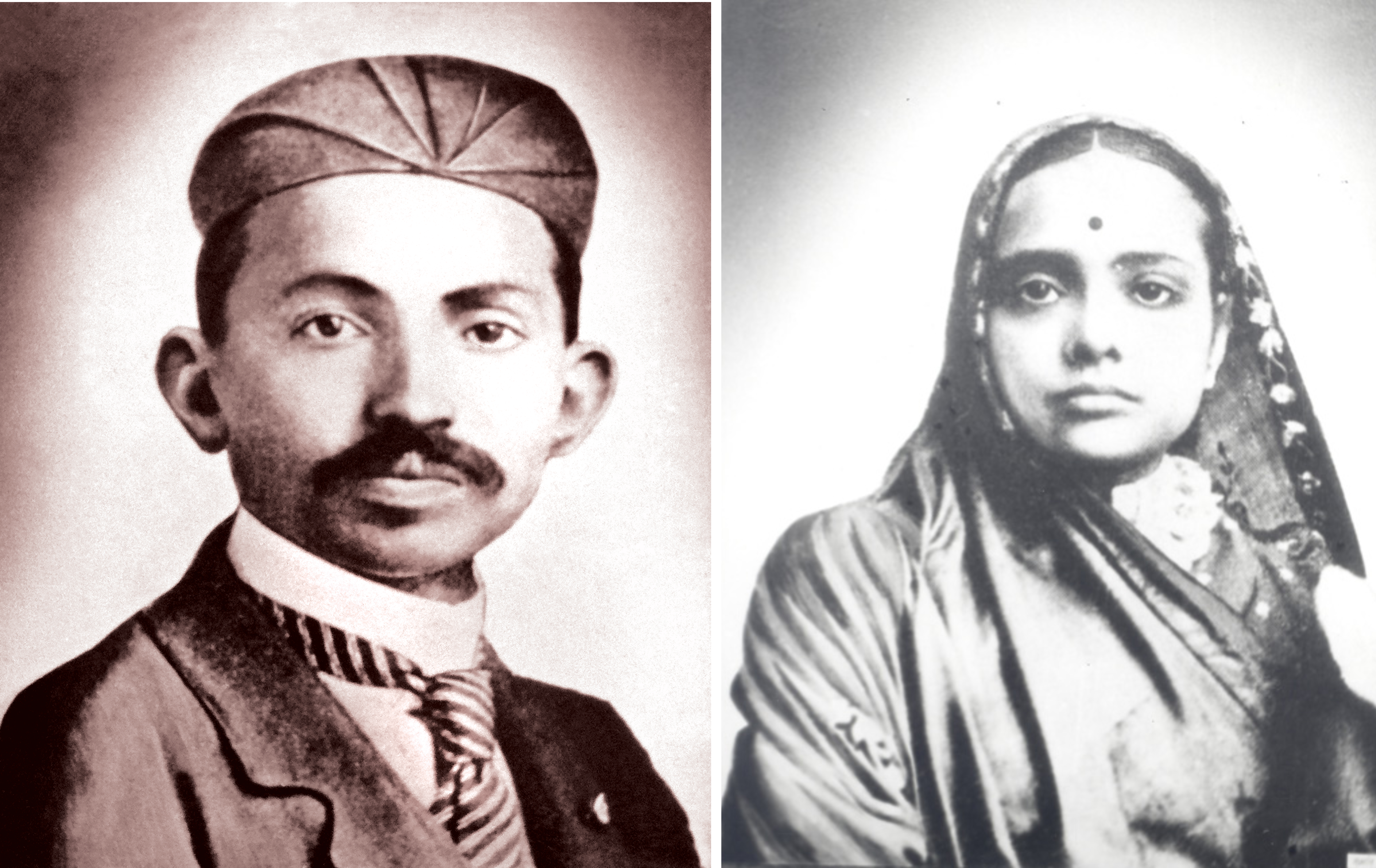
Kasturba (right), and Mohandas in 1902

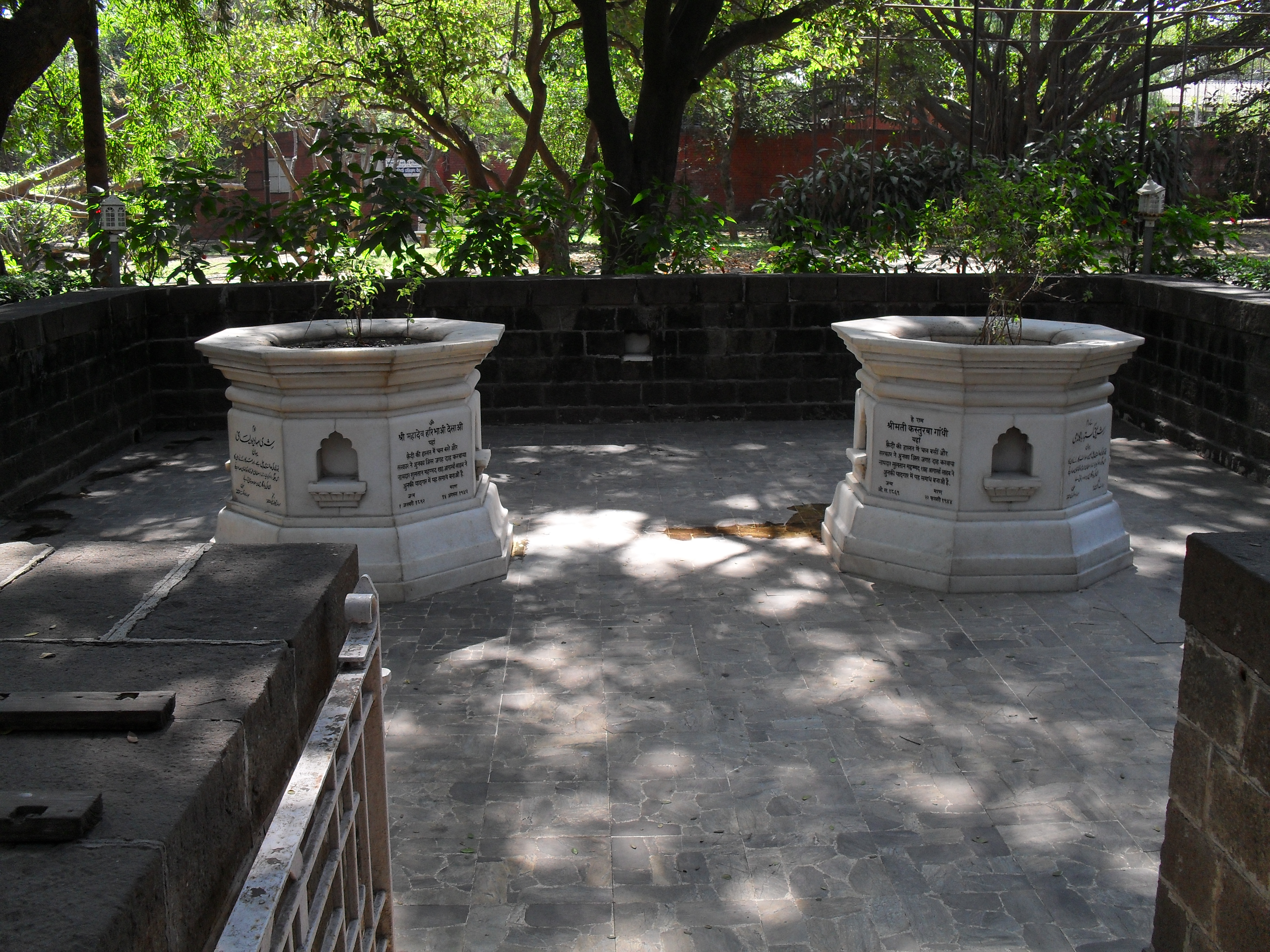
Kasturba Gandhi memorial stone (on the right) with the memorial stone of Mahadev Desai in Aga Khan Palace, Pune where she died

Kasturba suffered from chronic bronchitis due to complications at birth. Her bronchitis was complicated by pneumonia. In January 1908 she fasted while her husband was in prison, and she became gravely ill. She came so close to death that Mohandas apologised to her, and promised he would not remarry if she died. Kasturba would later undergo a major surgery.

In January 1944, Kasturba suffered two heart attacks, after which she was confined to her bed much of the time. Even there she found no respite from pain. Spells of breathlessness interfered with her sleep at night. She asked to see an Ayurvedic doctor, and after several delays, the government allowed a specialist in traditional Indian medicine to attend to her. At first she responded well, recovering enough by the second week in February to sit on the veranda in a wheelchair for short periods and talk with him. Later she suffered a relapse. Her son Devdas ordered penicillin, but her doctors did not want to use it because the final failure of her kidneys could not be relieved by penicillin. The doctors informed the Gandhi family that the condition of Kasturba had already deteriorated enough that penicillin would not be helpful.

She died at the Aga Khan Palace in Pune, at 7:35 PM local time on 22 February 1944, aged 74.

The Kasturba Gandhi National Memorial Trust Fund was set up in her memory. Mohandas requested that this fund be used to help women and children in villages in India.

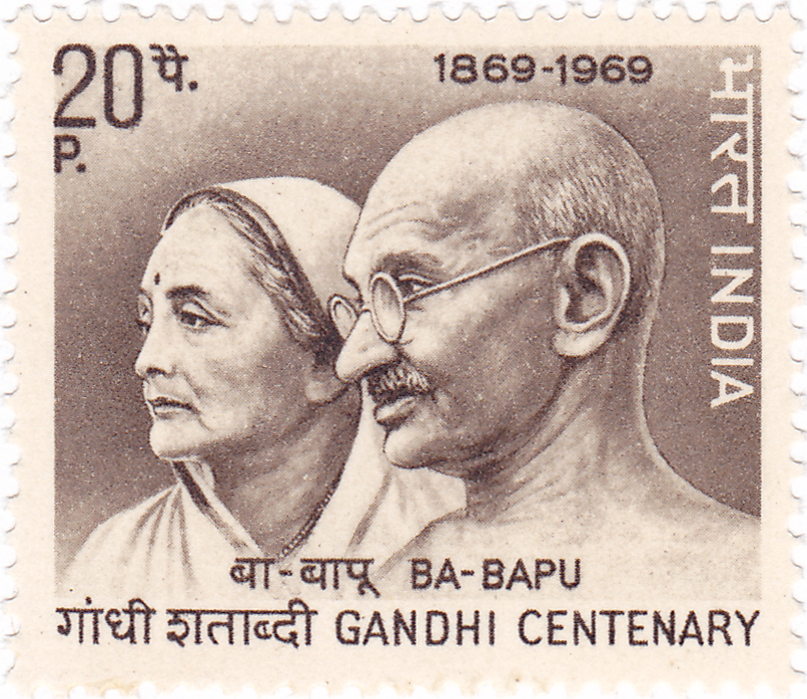
Kasturba and Mohandas on an Indian Postal Stamp (1969)

== Legacy ==
Many institutions, roads, and cities are named after Kasturba Gandhi:

- Kasturba Gandhi College for Women
- Kasturba Polytechnic for Women, Delhi
- Kasturba Hospital (Wardha)
- Kasturba Vaidyakiya Rahat Mandal (Kasturba Hospital, Valsad, Gujarat) Since 1944
- Kasturba Medical College, Manipal
- Kasturba Nagar railway station
- Kasturba Gandhi Balika Vidyalaya
- Kasturba Nagar (Delhi Assembly constituency)
- Kasturba Gandhi National Memorial Trust
- Kasturba Health Society
- Kasturba Nagar, Chennai
- Kasturba Nagar, Puducherry
- Kasturba College for Women, Villianur, Puducherry
- Kasturba Road
- Kasturba Gandhi Marg, New Delhi.
- Kasturba Nagar, Kochi.
- Kasturba Nagar, Bhopal.
- Kasturba Gandhi Primary School, Durban, South Africa

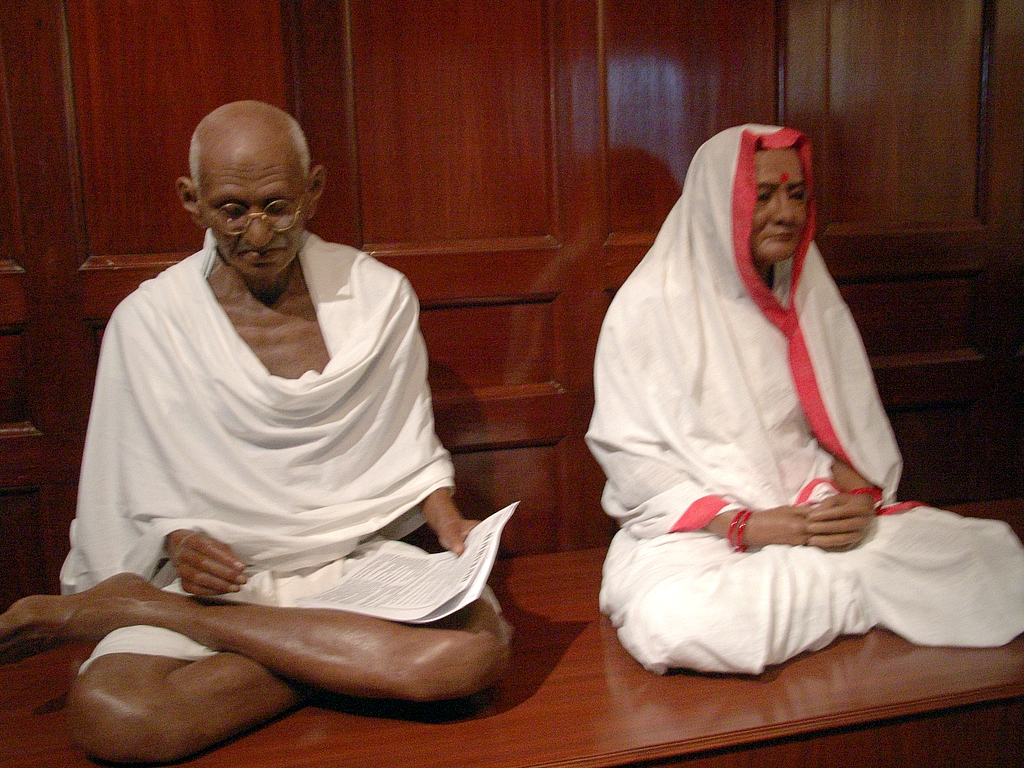
Mohandas Gandhi and Kasturba Gandhi at Eternal Gandhi Multimedia Museum, Gandhi Smriti (Birla House), Tees January Marg, New Delhi.

== In popular culture ==
Narayan Desai wrote a play, Kasturba, based on Kasturba Gandhi. It was directed by Aditi Desai and was staged several times.

In the 1982 film Gandhi, the role of Kasturba Gandhi was played by Rohini Hattangadi.
In the 2007 film Gandhi, My Father, the role of Kasturba Gandhi was played by Shefali Shah.

== See also ==
- List of civil rights leaders

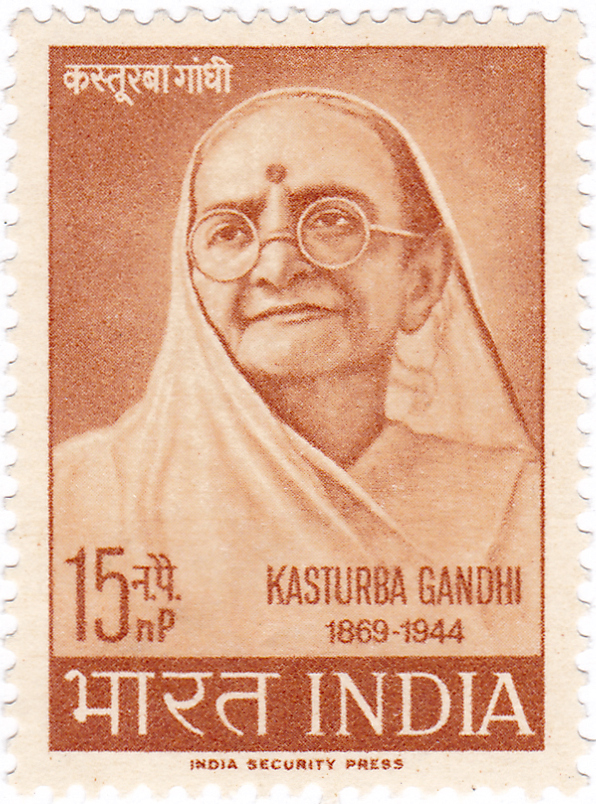
Kasturba Gandhi Postal Stamp (1964)
