= Statue of Mahatma Gandhi =

There are several statues of Mahatma Gandhi located in different countries:

== In Ghana ==
- Statue of Mahatma Gandhi, Accra

== In India ==
- Statue of Mahatma Gandhi, Parliament of India, New Delhi
- Statue of Mahatma Gandhi, Gandhi Maidan, Patna

== In South Africa ==
- Statue of Mahatma Gandhi, Johannesburg
- Statue of Mahatma Gandhi, Pietermaritzburg

== In the United Kingdom ==
- Statue of Mahatma Gandhi, Parliament Square, London
- Statue of Mahatma Gandhi, Tavistock Square, London

== In the United States ==
- Statue of Mahatma Gandhi (Davis, California)
- Statue of Mahatma Gandhi (Houston)
- Statue of Mahatma Gandhi (New York City)
- Statue of Mahatma Gandhi (San Francisco)

== See also ==
- Mahatma Gandhi (disambiguation)
