= List of things named after Mahatma Gandhi =

The following things have been named after Mahatma Gandhi:

== Roads ==
- Mahatma Gandhi Road

== Universities, colleges, schools, and research institutes ==
=== Universities ===
- Mahatma Gandhi Central University
- Mahatma Gandhi Kashi Vidyapith, Varanasi
- Gandhigram Rural Institute, Dindigul in Tamil Nadu
- Mahatma Gandhi College
- Mahatma Gandhi University, Kottayam
- Mahatma Gandhi Antarrashtriya Hindi Vishwavidyalaya
- Mahatma Gandhi University, Nalgonda
- Mahatma Gandhi Chitrakoot Gramoday Vishwavidyalaya
- Mahatma Gandhi Institute for Rural Industrialization
- Mahatma Gandhi Institute of Technology, Hyderabad.
- Mahatma Gandhi University, Meghalaya
- MGM Institute of Health Sciences
- Mahatma Gandhi Institute of Education for Peace and Sustainable Development, New Delhi
- Mahatma Gandhi Labour Institute, Gujarat
- Mahatma Gandhi Institute of Rural Energy and Development, Bangalore, Karnataka

=== Medical Colleges ===
- Mahatma Gandhi Institute of Medical Sciences
- Mahatma Gandhi Memorial Medical College, Indore
- Mahatma Gandhi Memorial Medical College, Jamshedpur
- Mahatma Gandhi Medical College & Research Institute
- Gandhi Medical College

=== Engineering Colleges ===
- Mahatma Gandhi University college of engineering
- Mahatma Gandhi Institute of Technology
- Mahatma Gandhi Mission's College of Engineering and Technology

=== Hospitals ===
- Mahatma Gandhi Memorial Hospital

=== Foundations ===
- Mahatma Gandhi National Foundation
- Gandhi Memorial International Foundation
- Mahatma Gandhi Foundation
- Gandhi Vidya Mandir

=== Arts and Science Colleges ===
- Mahatma Gandhi National Memorial Trust
- Mahatma Gandhi Government Arts College
- Mahatma Gandhi College, Lakshadweep
- Gandhi Memorial College, Srinagar
- Mahatma Gandhi Memorial College
- Mahatma Gandhi Inter College
- Mahathma Gandhi College, Iritty
- Mahatma Gandhi Government College, Mayabunder

=== Schools ===
- Barasat Mahatma Gandhi Memorial High School
- Mahatma Gandhi International School, Pasay
- Mahatma Gandhi Memorial High School (Fiji)
- Mahatma Gandhi College, Purulia
- Mahatma Gandhi High School, Sheragada
- Mahatma Gandhi Centenary Vidyalaya
- Palashipara Mahatma Gandhi Smriti Vidyapith

== Structures and Places ==
- Gandhinagar, Gujarat, India
- Gandhidham, Gujarat, India
- Mahatma Gandhi Bus Station, Hyderabad
- Mahatma Gandhi Memorial (Milwaukee)
- Statue of Mahatma Gandhi, Parliament Square
- Mahatma Gandhi Road metro station (Bangalore)
- Mahatma Gandhi Setu
- Mahatma Gandhi District, Houston
- Mahatma Gandhi Marine National Park
- Gandhi Smriti
- Mahatma Gandhi Park
- Gandhi Market
- Mahatma Gandhi Road metro station
- National Gandhi Museum
- Gandhi Bhawan, Chandigarh
- Mahatma Gandhi Super Thermal Power Project
- Gandhi Heritage Portal
- Gandhi Memorial Museum, Madurai
- Gandhi Smarak Sangrahalaya
- Gandhi Maidan
- Gandhi Mandapam (Chennai)
- Gandhi Sangrahalaya, Patna
- Mahatma Gandhi Stadium
- Gandhi Promenade
- Kaba Gandhi No Delo
- Gandhi Teerth
- Gandhi Temple, Bhatara
- Mahatma Gandhi Square, Kiryat Gat, Israel
- Gandhi Square, Johannesburg, South Africa
- Gandhi Square, Rivière du Rempart, Mauritius
- Gandhi Square, Falcon's Lea Park, Davie, Broward County, Florida, United States
- Gandhi Village, Debe, Trinidad and Tobago

== Films ==
- Gandhi
- Mahatma: Life of Gandhi, 1869–1948
- Gandhi, My Father
- Gandhi Godse – Ek Yudh
- The Gandhi Murder

== Books written on Mahatma Gandhi ==
- Gandhi the Man
- Gandhi: The Years That Changed the World
- Gandhi: Behind the Mask of Divinity
- Great Soul: Mahatma Gandhi and His Struggle With India

== National Holiday ==
- Gandhi Jayanti

== Others ==
- Mahatma Gandhi Series (banknotes)
- Gandhi cap
- India 10 Rupees Mahatma Gandhi postage stamp
- Gandhi Peace Award
- 120461 Gandhi, a Florian asteroid named in his honor in September 2020
- 2019 Gandhi March

== Awards ==
- Gandhi Peace Prize
