= Mahatma Gandhi Memorial =

Mahatma Gandhi Memorial may refer to:

- Mahatma Gandhi Memorial (Coimbatore), Tamil Nadu, India
- Mahatma Gandhi Memorial (Milwaukee), 2002 statue
- Mahatma Gandhi Memorial (Washington, D.C.), 2000 statue
- Mahatma Gandhi Memorial Centre, Matale, Sri Lanka
- Mahatma Gandhi Memorial College, Karnataka, India
- Mahatma Gandhi Memorial Hospital, Telangana, India
- Mahatma Gandhi Memorial Hospital (Bhojpur), Nepal
- Mahatma Gandhi Memorial Medical College (disambiguation)
- Mahatma Gandhi Memorial Post Graduate College, Uttar Pradesh, India

== See also ==
- Gandhi (disambiguation)
