= Gandhi (disambiguation) =

Mahatma Gandhi (1869–1948) is widely regarded as the main icon of the Indian independence movement.

Gandhi or Ghandhi may also refer to:

- Gandhi (surname), a surname, and list of people with the name
- Gandhi (Chhimba clan), a clan of the Chhimba caste in India

== Arts ==
- Gandhi Before India, a biography of Gandhi written by historian Ramachandra Guha
- Gandhi: The Years That Changed the World, a biography of Gandhi written by historian Ramachandra Guha
- Gandhi (film), a 1982 biographical film about Gandhi
- Gandhi, My Father, a 2007 film about the relationship between Gandhi and his son
- Gandhi (American band)
- Gandhi (Costa Rican band)
- "Gandhi", a song by Anne McCue
- "Gandhi", a song from the Patti Smith album Trampin'

== People ==
- Indira Gandhi, former Prime Minister of India
- Rajiv Gandhi, former Prime Minister of India
- Rahul Gandhi, Member of Parliament and former President of the Indian National Congress
- Sonia Gandhi, Member of Parliament and former President of the Indian National Congress
- Mahatma Gandhi (footballer), Brazilian footballer
- Gandhi Djuna, Congolese-French rapper and songwriter also known as Gims

== Other ==
- Gandhi (bookstore), a Mexican bookstore chain
- Gandhi Hospital, several hospitals in multiple countries
- MV Hannington Court (1954) or Gandhi, a cargo ship
- Nickname of Rehavam Ze'evi (1926–2001), Israeli general and politician
- Gandhi (Mexico City Metrobús), a BRT station in Mexico City
- Gandhi (Clone High), a character of the animated sitcom Clone High

== See also ==
- Gandhi family (disambiguation)
- Gandhism, ideology of Mahatma Gandhi
- Gandhigiri, a revival of Gandhism in India
- Gandi, a French domain name registrar and web host
- Gandy (disambiguation)
- Gandha (disambiguation)
- Gondi (disambiguation)
- Statue of Mahatma Gandhi (disambiguation)
- Mahatma Gandhi Memorial (disambiguation)
- Mahatma Gandhi Memorial Medical College (disambiguation)
- Mahatma Gandhi University (disambiguation)
- List of things named after Mahatma Gandhi
- Gandhian socialism (disambiguation)
- Gandhinagar (disambiguation)
- Indira Gandhi ministry (disambiguation)
- Rajiv Gandhi ministry (disambiguation)
