= Institute of Medical Sciences =

The Institute of Medical Sciences may refer to one of several organisations:

== India ==
- A J Institute of Medical Science, a medical college in Mangalore, Karnataka
- All India Institutes of Medical Sciences, autonomous Indian public medical institute group
  - All India Institute of Medical Sciences, New Delhi, its flagship medical college and hospital in New Delhi
- Amala Institute of Medical Sciences, a private medical college near Amalanagar, in Thrissur District, Kerala
- Atal Bihari Vajpayee Institute of Medical Sciences and Dr. RML Hospital, New Delhi, India
- Guntur Institute of Medical Sciences, a medical college in Guntur, Andhra Pradesh
- Indira Gandhi Institute of Medical Sciences
- Institute of Medical Sciences, Banaras Hindu University, Varanasi, Uttar Pradesh
- Institute of Medical Sciences and Sum Hospital, Odisha
- Kalinga Institute of Medical Sciences, the health wing of the KIIT Group of Institutions situated in Bhubaneswar, Orissa
- Karnataka Institute of Medical Sciences, Hubballi, Karnataka; previously the Karnataka Medical College (KMC)
- Khaja Banda Nawaz Institute of Medical Sciences, Bangalore, Karnataka
- Kempegowda Institute of Medical Sciences, Bangalore, Karnataka
- Maharashtra Institute of Medical Science and Research, Latur, a medical institution in Latur, Maharashtra
- Mahatma Gandhi Institute of Medical Sciences, run by the Kasturba Health Society
- Malabar Institute of Medical Sciences, a hospital located in Kozhikode, Kerala
- MediCiti Institute of Medical Sciences, a medical college, affiliated with the NTR University of Health Sciences, Andhra Pradesh
- N. S. Memorial Institute of Medical Sciences, Kollam, Kerala
- Nizam's Institute of Medical Sciences, a university in Hyderabad, Telangana
- P.E.S. Institute of Medical Sciences and Research, a medical college in the town of Kuppam, Andhra Pradesh
- Pondicherry Institute of Medical Sciences, a private educational institute located in Pondicherry
- Rajarajeswari Medical College and Hospital (RRMCH) in Bangalore, Karnataka
- Rajendra Institute of Medical Sciences, an institute at Ranchi University, Ranchi, Jharkhand
- Rajendra Memorial Research Institute of Medical Sciences, Agam Kuan, Patna, Bihar
- Regional Institute of Medical Sciences, Imphal, Manipur
- Rural Institute of Medical Sciences and Research, a medical college in Saifai, Uttar Pradesh
- Sanjay Gandhi Postgraduate Institute of Medical Sciences, Lucknow, Uttar Pradesh
- Sikkim Manipal Institute of Medical Sciences, a medical college located in Sikkim
- Sree Chitra Tirunal Institute for Medical Sciences and Technology, Trivandrum, Thiruvananthapuram, Kerala
- Telangana Institute of Medical Sciences and Research (TIMS), Hyderabad, Telangana
- Vijayanagar Institute of Medical Sciences, Bellary, Karnataka; previously the Bellary Medical College
- Vydehi Institute of Medical Sciences and Research Centre, Whitefield, Bangalore

== Japan ==
- Institute of Medical Science (Japan), an ancillary establishment of University of Tokyo
- Nihon Institute of Medical Science, a private university in Moroyama, Saitama

== Pakistan ==
- Kust Institute of Medical Sciences of Kohat University of Science and Technology (KUST)
- Pakistan Institute of Medical Sciences, Islamabad
- Services Institute of Medical Sciences, a public medical school, attached to Services Hospital in Lahore

== United Kingdom ==
- Institute of Medical Sciences, University of Aberdeen

== United States ==
- National Institute of General Medical Sciences

== See also ==
- Rajiv Gandhi Institute of Medical Sciences (disambiguation)
