= Rajiv Gandhi (disambiguation) =

Rajiv Gandhi (1944–1991) was an Indian politician who served as the Prime Minister of India from 1984–89.

Rajiv Gandhi may also refer to:

== Colleges and research institutes in India ==
- Rajiv Gandhi University (disambiguation)
  - Rajiv Gandhi University of Health Sciences, Bangalore, Karnataka
  - Rajiv Gandhi Technical University, a multi-campus technical institute in Madhya Pradesh
- Rajiv Gandhi Centre for Biotechnology, a research institute in Thiruvananthapuram, Kerala
- Rajiv Gandhi Institute of Medical Sciences (disambiguation)
- Rajiv Gandhi Institute of Technology (disambiguation)
  - Rajiv Gandhi Institute of Technology, Kottayam, an engineering college in Kerala
  - Rajiv Gandhi Institute of Technology, Mumbai, an engineering college affiliated to the University of Mumbai, Maharashtra
- Rajiv Gandhi Medical College, Thane, Maharashtra
- Rajiv Gandhi School of Intellectual Property Law, a law school based at the Indian Institute of Technology, Kharagpur, West Bengal

== Other uses ==
- Rajiv Gandhi Foundation, a charitable institution in India
- Rajiv Gandhi International Airport, Hyderabad, Telangana, India
- Rajiv Gandhi International Cricket Stadium, Hyderabad, Telangana, India
- Rajiv Gandhi Khel Ratna, India's highest sporting honour
- Rajiv Gandhi National Park (disambiguation), four national parks in India

== See also ==
- Rajiv Gandhi ministry (disambiguation)
- List of things named after Rajiv Gandhi
