= RGIT =

RGIT may refer to:

- Rajiv Gandhi Institute of Technology (disambiguation)
- Robert Gordon's Institute of Technology, the former name of The Robert Gordon University,
