= Hannington Court =

Three ships of the Court Line have borne the name Hannington Court:

- SS Hannington Court was a cargo ship launched in 1912. She was renamed Elios in 1936, Empire Brigade in 1940, and was sunk later that year.
- SS Hannington Court (1939) was a cargo ship launched in 1939. She caught fire in 1941 and was scuttled.
- MV Hannington Court (1954) was a cargo ship launched in 1954. She was renamed Gandhi Jayanti in 1963, Gandhi in 1974 and was scrapped in 1976.
