= Mahatma Gandhi University =

Mahatma Gandhi University may refer to these universities in India named after Indian independence leader Mahatma Gandhi:

- Mahatma Gandhi Central University, Bihar
- Mahatma Gandhi Kashi Vidyapith, Uttar Pradesh
- Mahatma Gandhi University, Kerala
- Mahatma Gandhi University, Meghalaya
- Mahatma Gandhi University, Telangana
- Mahatma Gandhi University, West Bengal
- Mahatma Gandhi University of Medical Sciences & Technology, Rajasthan

== See also ==
- Gandhi (disambiguation)
