= Rajiv Gandhi Institute of Technology =

Rajiv Gandhi Institute of Technology may refer to the following institutes of Technology in India named after former Indian prime minister Rajiv Gandhi:

- Rajiv Gandhi Institute of Technology, Kottayam, Kerala
- Rajiv Gandhi Institute of Technology, Mumbai, Maharashtra

== See also ==
- Rajiv Gandhi (disambiguation)
- Rajiv Gandhi Institute of Medical Sciences (disambiguation)
- Rajiv Gandhi University (disambiguation)
