= Gandhian socialism =

Gandhian socialism may refer to two separate concepts related to Mahatma Gandhi:

- Practices and beliefs of Mahatma Gandhi, including his views on socialism
  - Gandhian economics
- Gandhian socialism (Hindu nationalism), a Hindu nationalist variant of socialism

== See also ==
- Socialism in India
- Gandhi (disambiguation)
