= Rajiv Gandhi ministry =

Rajiv Gandhi ministry may refer to these Indian governments headed by Rajiv Gandhi as prime minister:

- First Rajiv Gandhi ministry, from October to December 1984
- Second Rajiv Gandhi ministry, from December 1984 to December 1989

== See also ==
- Rajiv Gandhi (disambiguation)
- Indira Gandhi ministry (disambiguation)
- Gandhi (disambiguation)
