= Indira Gandhi ministry =

Indira Gandhi ministry may refer to:

- First Indira Gandhi ministry, the Indian government headed by Indira Gandhi from 1966 to 1967
- Second Indira Gandhi ministry, the Indian government headed by Indira Gandhi from 1967 to 1971
- Third Indira Gandhi ministry, the Indian government headed by Indira Gandhi from 1971 to 1977
- Fourth Indira Gandhi ministry, the Indian government headed by Indira Gandhi from 1980 to 1984

== See also ==
- Gandhi (disambiguation)
- Indira Gandhi, the first female prime minister of India
- Rajiv Gandhi ministry (disambiguation)
  - First Rajiv Gandhi ministry (1984), of Rajiv Gandhi (her son) after her assassination
  - Second Rajiv Gandhi ministry (1984 - 1989)
