= Sanjay Srivastava (academician) =

Indian political scientist (born 1968)

Professor Sanjay Srivastava

Vice-chancellor of Mahatma Gandhi Central University Bihar
- Incumbent
- Assumed office April 2023
- Appointed by: President of India
- Chancellor: Dr. Mahesh Sharma
- Preceded by: Sanjeev Sharma

Personal details
- Born: 28 January 1968 (age 58)
- Education: Allahabad University; SIS/JNU Kumaun University

Sanjay Srivastava (born 28 January 1968) is an Academician currently serving as the Vice-Chancellor of Mahatma Gandhi Central University, Motihari. (MGCU), since April 2023. Previously, he was a Professor of political science at Banaras Hindu University.

== Biography ==
Before joining Mahatma Gandhi Central University as Vice Chancellor, Srivastava was a Political Science professor at Banaras Hindu University, specializing in international relations, India’s foreign policy, and conflict resolution. He was also involved in curriculum development, research supervision, and administration.

He has held international academic positions, including as a Fulbright Visiting Scholar at American University, Washington, D.C. (2016–17), and served on key university bodies like the BHU Court (2018–21) and Jamia Millia Islamia’s Executive Council and Finance Committee (2022–25).

His administrative experience includes NAAC accreditation, UGC committees, ICSSR, and HRDC at JNU (2019–21). He was Vice Chairman of the BHU School Board (2019–22) and served on Arya Mahila PG College’s Management Committee (2019–21).

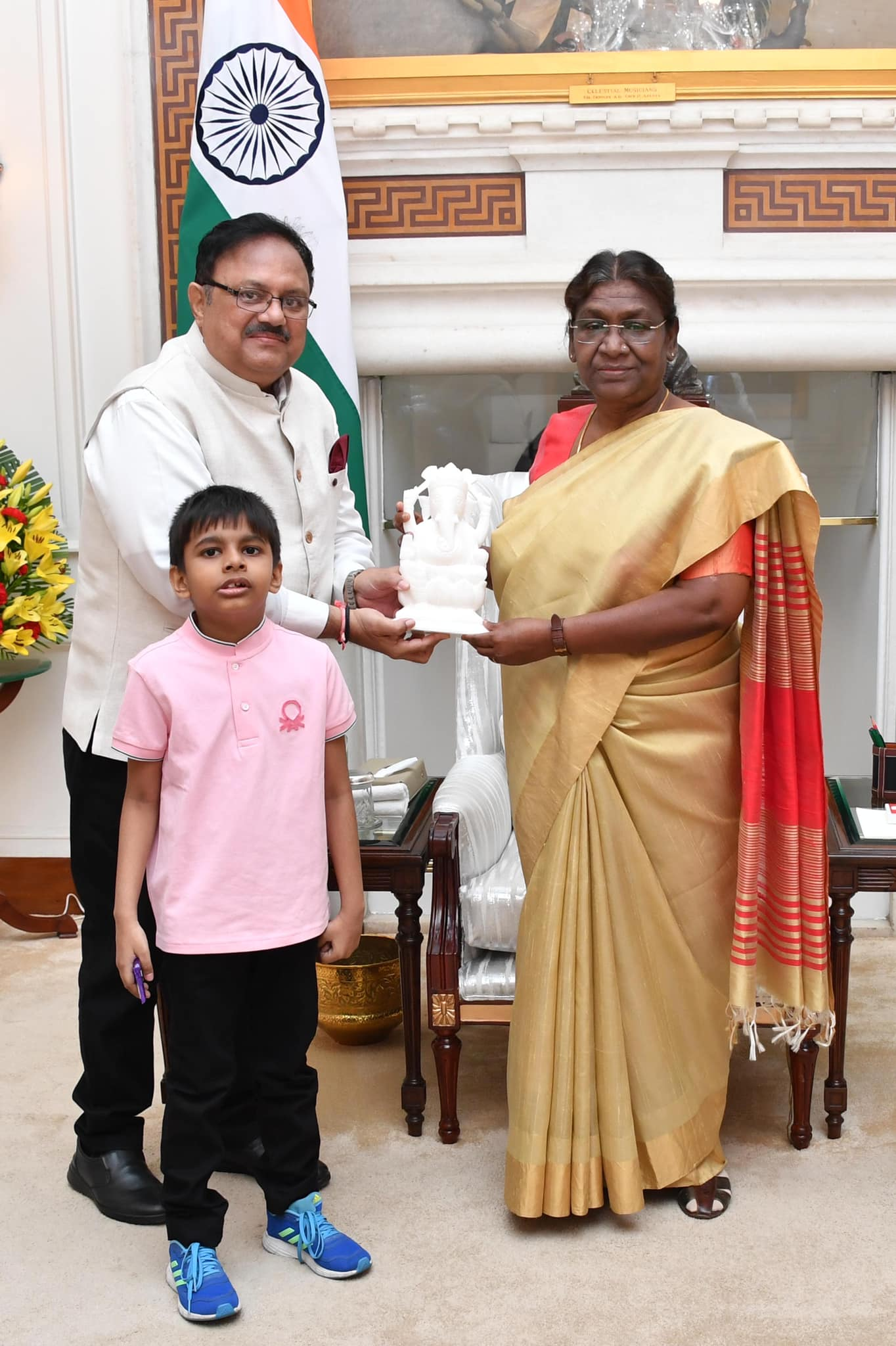
VC_MEETS_THE_PRESIDENT

Srivastava has engaged in global collaborations, serving as the ICCR Chair at Yerevan State University, Armenia (2013–14), and lecturing at institutions like Barry University and the College of Southern Nevada. He participated in academic events at Syracuse University (2016) and the International Studies Association (2017).

He completed the Leadership for Academicians Program (LEAP) at the University of Cambridge and IIT Kharagpur (2019). His research focuses on public diplomacy, including experimental research.

Awarded with the UGC Career Award (2004) and Salzburg Seminar Fellowship (2005), he has presented internationally and published extensively. He has also been a visiting professor at the Diplomatic Academy of Armenia and Yerevan State University.

Recognized for contributions to higher education, he has received awards like the Gaur Mani Award, Loknayak Jai Prakash Award (presented by former President Ram Nath Kovind), and Shiksha Shri Samman (2023).

== Work History ==
Academic Experience
Duration	Post	Organization
2009 - continuing	Professor	Department of Political Science, Banaras Hindu University
2016 - 2017	Fulbright Award	American University, Washington D.C
2013 - 2014	ICCR Chair of Contemporary Indian Studies	Yerevan State University
2006 - 2009	Associate Professor	Department of Political Science, Banaras Hindu University
2003 - 2006	Reader	Department of Political Science, Dr.H.S. Gour University, Sagar
1997 - 2003	Lecturer	Department of Political Science, Dr.H.S. Gour University, Sagar

== Awards ==
'Fulbright Professional and Academic Excellence Fellowship Award' by ‘United States India Educational Foundation' in 2016

'ICCR's Chair at Yerevan State University, Armenia Award' by 'Indian Council for Cultural Relations' in 2013

'Member, BHU Court Award' by 'BHU' in 2018

'UGC Research Award Award' by 'UGC' in 2004

'Fellow at LEAP Award' by 'MHRD, New Delhi' in 2019

'Fellow, Salzburg Seminar Award' by 'Salzburg Seminar, Austria' in 2005

'Member, Executive Council Award' by 'Jamia Millia Islamia, New Delhi’ in 2022

Loknayak Jai Prakash Award 2023 Loknayak Jai Prakash Award 2023 for his contributions to the education sector. The 14th President of India, Shri Ram Nath Kovind, presented the award in a ceremony held at Delhi

Shiksha Shri Samman by the Dr. Shambhu Sharan & Shanti Sharan Memorial Trust

Gaur Mani On the occasion of the 154th birth anniversary of Dr. Sir Harisingh Gaur, founder of Dr. Harisingh Gaur University, educator, jurist, member of the Constituent Assembly, and philanthropist, Srivastava was awarded the "Gaur Mani" award, which recognizes individuals who have made significant contributions to education, law, and public service.
