= Mahatma Gandhi Memorial Medical College =

Mahatma Gandhi Memorial Medical College may refer to these medical schools in India:

- Mahatma Gandhi Memorial Medical College, Indore
- Mahatma Gandhi Memorial Medical College, Jamshedpur

== See also ==
- Mahatma Gandhi Memorial (disambiguation)
- Gandhi (disambiguation)
