= Rajiv Gandhi Institute of Medical Sciences =

Rajiv Gandhi Institute of Medical Sciences may refer to the following medical schools in India named former Indian prime minister Rajiv Gandhi:

- Rajiv Gandhi Institute of Medical Sciences, Adilabad, Telangana
- Rajiv Gandhi Institute of Medical Sciences, Kadapa or Government Medical College, Kadapa, Andhra Pradesh
- Rajiv Gandhi Institute of Medical Sciences, Ongole or Government Medical College, Ongole, Andhra Pradesh
- Rajiv Gandhi Institute of Medical Sciences, Srikakulam or Government Medical College, Srikakulam, Andhra Pradesh

== See also ==
- Rajiv Gandhi (disambiguation)
- Institute of Medical Sciences (disambiguation)
- Rajiv Gandhi Institute of Technology (disambiguation)
- Rajiv Gandhi University (disambiguation)
