= Gandhi family =

Gandhi family may refer to:

- The family of Mahatma Gandhi, one of the leader for Indian independence movement
- The unrelated Nehru–Gandhi family, which has produced three Indian prime ministers

== See also ==
- Gandhi (disambiguation)
