= Rajiv Gandhi University (disambiguation) =

Rajiv Gandhi University is a university in Arunachal Pradesh, India.

Rajiv Gandhi University may also refer to the following universities in India named after former Indian prime minister Rajiv Gandhi:

- Assam Rajiv Gandhi University of Cooperative Management, in Assam
- Rajiv Gandhi Proudyogiki Vishwavidyalaya or Rajiv Gandhi Technical University, in Madhya Pradesh
- Rajiv Gandhi University of Knowledge Technologies, Basara, in Telangana
- Rajiv Gandhi University of Knowledge Technologies, Nuzvid, in Andhra Pradesh
- Rajiv Gandhi University of Health Sciences, in Karnataka

== See also ==
- Rajiv Gandhi (disambiguation)
- Rajiv Gandhi Institute of Medical Sciences (disambiguation)
  - Rajiv Gandhi Institute of Medical Sciences, Kadapa, in Andhra Pradesh
- Rajiv Gandhi Institute of Technology (disambiguation)
