= Statue of Mahatma Gandhi (Davis, California) =

Statue of Mahatma Gandhi in Davis, California, U.S.

- Medium: Sculpture
- Subject: Mahatma Gandhi
- Location: Davis, California, U.S.; 38.54605°N 121.74467°W

A statue of Mahatma Gandhi was installed in Davis, California, until 2021.

== See also ==
- List of artistic depictions of Mahatma Gandhi
