= Mahatma Gandhi Memorial (Washington, D.C.) =

Statue in Washington, D.C.

- Artist: Gautam Pal
- Year: 2000
- Type: Bronze
- Location: Washington, D.C., United States; 38°54′40″N 77°02′49″W

The Mahatma Gandhi Memorial is a public statue of Mahatma Gandhi, installed on a triangular island along Massachusetts Avenue, in front of the Embassy of India, Washington, D.C., in the United States. A gift from the Indian Council for Cultural Relations, it was dedicated on September 16, 2000 during a state visit of Indian Prime Minister Atal Bihari Vajpayee in the presence of US President Bill Clinton.

Sparked to action in the wake of the 50th anniversary of Indian independence in 1947, the US Congress passed a bill in 1998 authorising the Government of India to establish a memorial to Gandhi on US federal land in the District of Columbia.

The 8 ft 8 in (2.64 m) bronze statue depicts Mahatma Gandhi in ascetic garb, in reference to his 1930 march against the salt tax in India. It was designed by Gautam Pal, a sculptor from Kolkata. The statue is mounted on a 16 ton plinth of ruby granite from Ilkal, Karnataka, standing in a circular plaza of gray granite pavers. Behind it are three slabs of Karnataka red granite with inscriptions honoring Gandhi's memory, and in front of it is a seat also of red granite. The statue bears an inscription with Gandhi's answer to a journalist who asked for his message to the world: "My life is my message."

The Mahatma Gandhi Memorial unveiled in Milwaukee in 2002 includes a similar statue by Gautam Pal, also mounted on a red granite plinth.

== Vandalization ==
In June 2020, during the George Floyd protests, the Mahatma Gandhi Memorial in Washington, D.C. was vandalized by unknown individuals on the intervening night of June 2 and 3. The incident prompted the Indian Embassy to register a complaint with law enforcement agencies. Taranjit Singh Sandhu, the Indian Ambassador to the United States called the vandalism "a crime against humanity". U.S. President Donald Trump called the defacement of Mahatma Gandhi's statue a "disgrace".

The statue was defaced and vandalized during a Khalistani separatist rally on 12 December 2020.

== See also ==
- List of artistic depictions of Mahatma Gandhi
- List of public art in Washington, D.C., Ward 2
