= Gandhi (bookstore) =

Mexican bookstore chain

Gandhi Bookstore
- Type: Subsidiary
- Industry: Retail
- Founded: Mexico (June 1971)
- Founder: Mauricio Achar
- Headquarters: Mexico City, Mexico
- Area served: Mexico
- Website: www.gandhi.com.mx

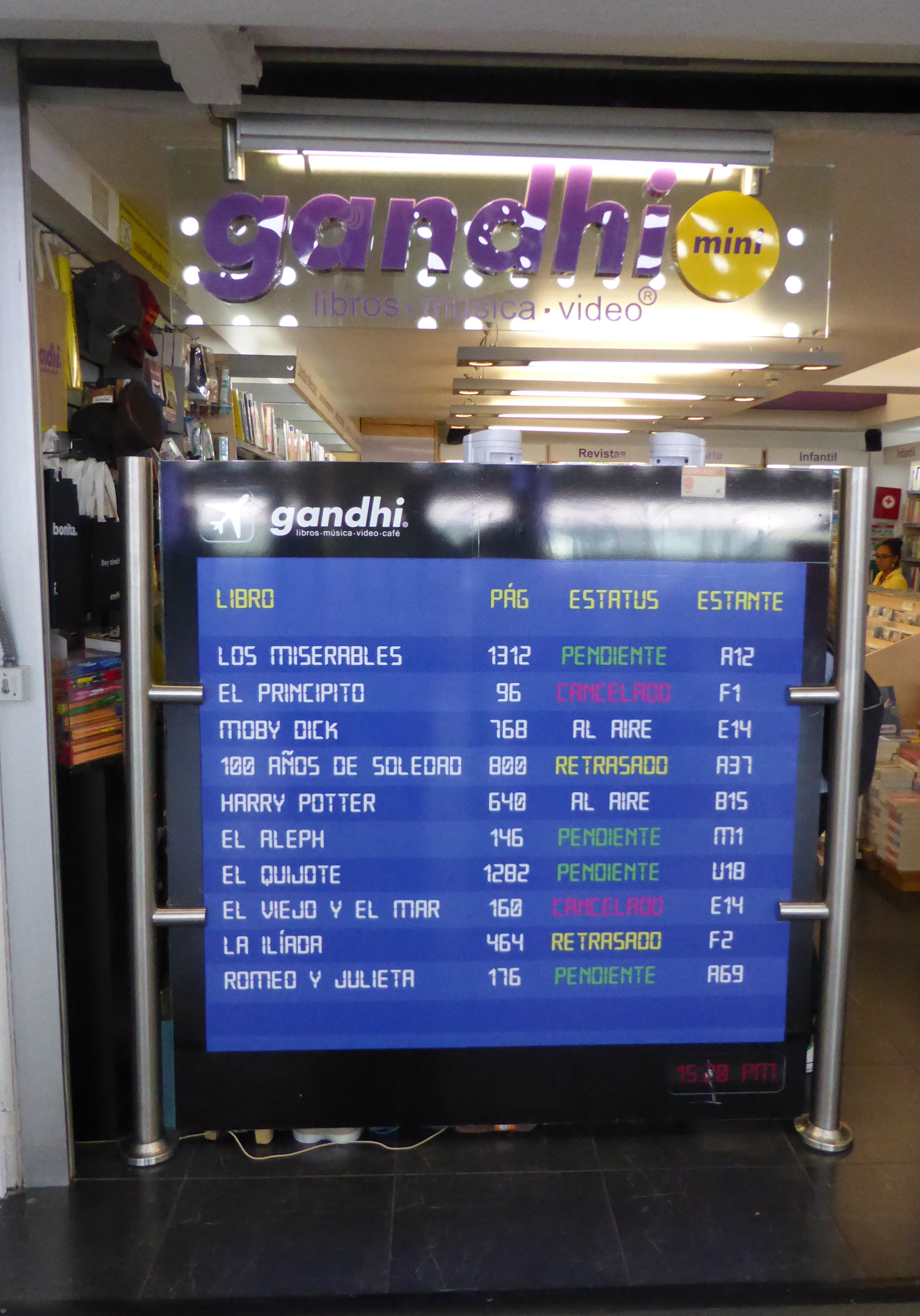
"Mini Gandhi" inside the Mexico City Airport

Librerías Gandhi (Gandhi Bookstores) is a bookstore chain in Mexico. They were created in 1971 and are one of the biggest bookstore chains in Mexico. After 55 years they now have more than 50 stores all over the country. The public that comes to the bookstores are mostly students, teachers, young adults, professionals, and anyone interested in culture and looking for information or entertainment.

== History ==
Gandhi Bookstores were founded in June 1971, by Mauricio Achar. He created the bookstore in the belief that a great amount of the country's problems were due to the lack of reading by its population. The bookstore took its name from Mahatma Gandhi and his influence; Achar wanted to do the same. The original store occupied 150 square meters, and was located at Miguel Ángel de Quevedo 128, south of Mexico City. Even though it was small, the store had a cafeteria of its own, where people would gather not just to read, but for cultural activities such as watching movies, theatrical plays, listening to music, etc. These were the basic things that made people more interested in going more often to the bookstore.

== Stores ==
Today, there are 51 different Gandhi Bookstores; 20 are located within Mexico City and 31 in other parts of the country. One store is located inside El Palacio de Hierro in the country's capital, and more exist in select Walmart Supercenters, and also in Mexico City's airport. They also have an online store that sells books internationally, allowing people from outside Mexico to access unique books from Latin American authors.

== Products ==
- Books
- CDs
- DVDs
- T-shirts
- Games for children
