= Mahatma Gandhi Memorial Centre, Matale =

Sri Lankan memorial centre

Mahatma Gandhi Memorial, Matale
- Year: 2015
- Location: Matale

Mahatma Gandhi Memorial Centre, Matale is a memorial situated in Matale in Central Province, Sri Lanka.

It was inaugurated by President Maithripala Sirisena and Indian High Commissioner Y. K. Sinha on 22 November 2015. The Mahatma Gandhi Memorial was built in remembrance of Mahatma Gandhi's historical visit to Sri Lanka (then called Ceylon) in 1927.

== See also ==
- Mahatma Gandhi's visit to Ceylon
