= Telangana Institute of Medical Sciences and Research =

Telangana Institute of Medical Sciences
- Department of Health, Medical & Family Welfare, Government of Telangana
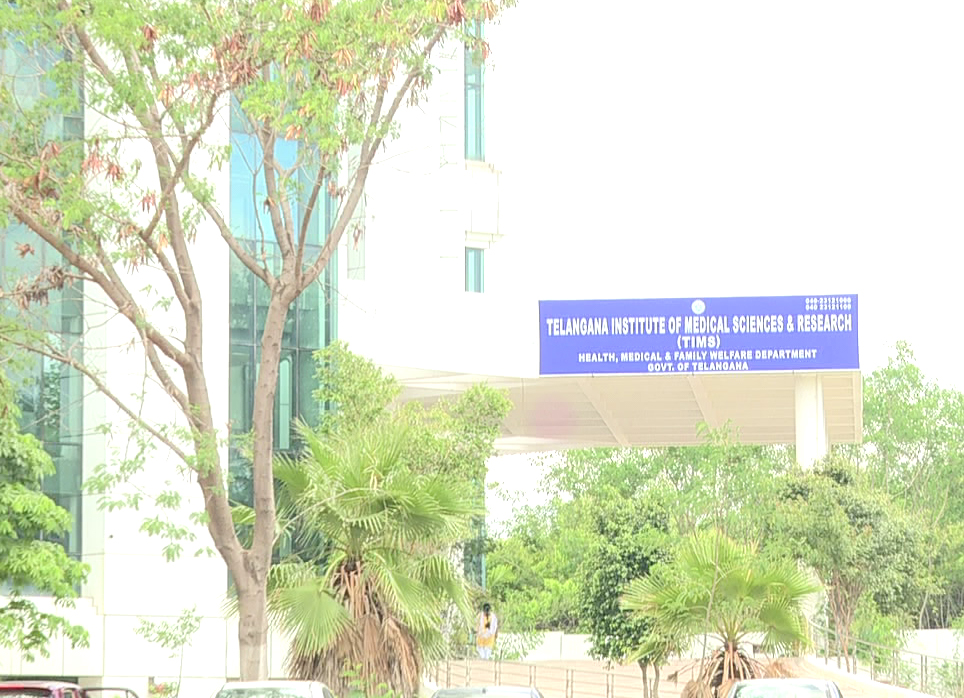

Geography
- Location: G.M.C Balayogi Athletic Stadium, Hyderabad, Telangana, India
- Coordinates: 17°26′34.1″N 78°20′37.4″E

Organisation
- Type: Specialist

Services
- Beds: 1,500
- Specialty: COVID-19

History
- Former names: Sports Village, G.M.C Balayogi Athletic Stadium
- Constructed: 2007
- Opened: 6 July 2020

Links
- Website: http://health.telangana.gov.in/
- Lists: Hospitals in India

The Telangana Institute of Medical Sciences (TIMS) is a hospital in Telangana, India. It is later to be developed as a medical school and public hospital. The hospital came into existence with the issue of G.O.Ms.No. 22, Health, Medical and Family Welfare Department on 25 April 2020.

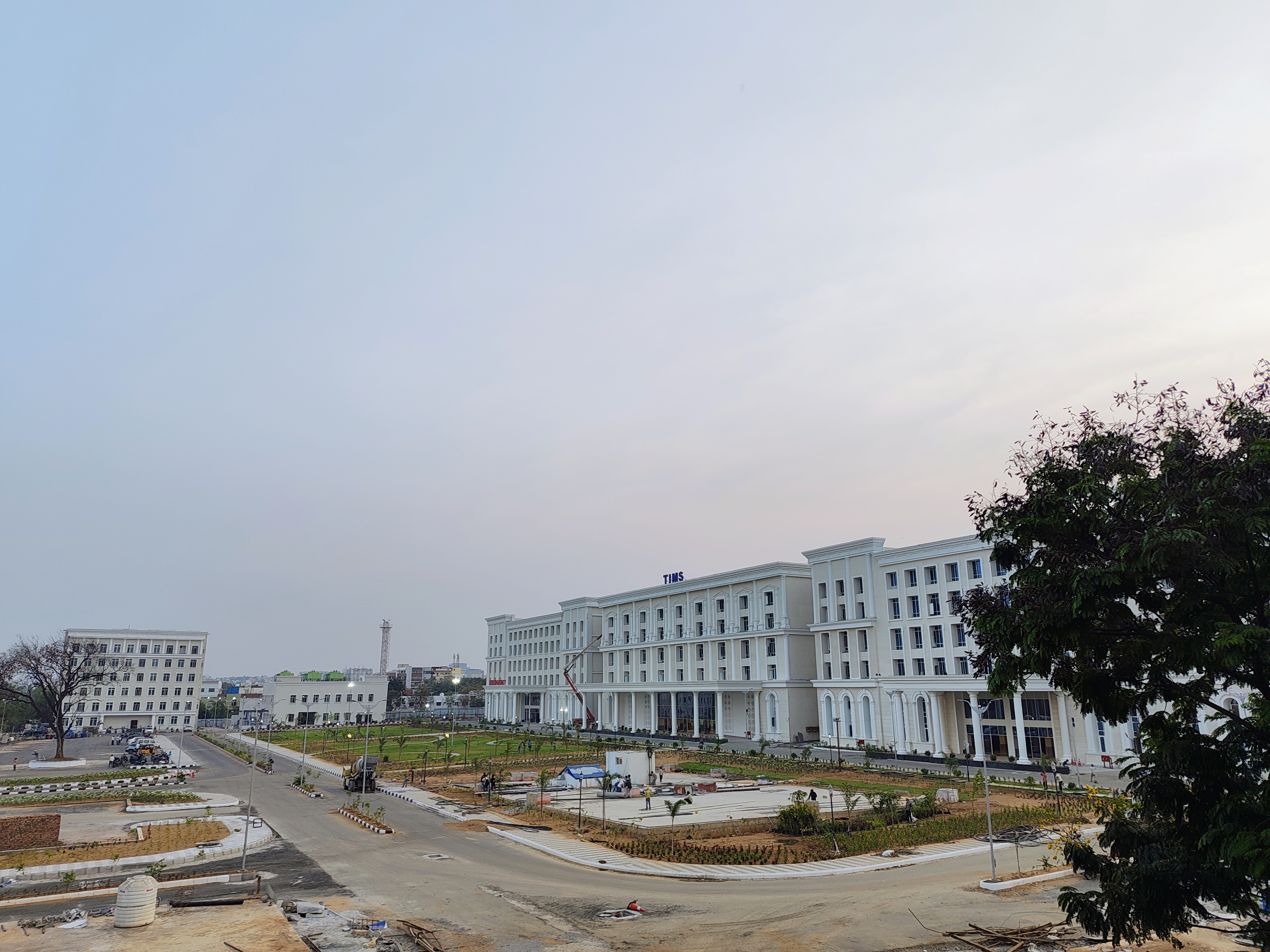
Telangana Institute Of Medical Sciences TIMS Sanathnagar Hyderabad Telangana

== History ==
In view of COVID-19 pandemic in India, it was decided by the Government of Telangana to establish a hospital in the Sports Hostel Building at G.M.C Balayogi Athletic Stadium, Gachibowli, Ranga Reddy District to provide health services. Pursuant to this decision, the Youth Advancement, Tourism and Culture Department has issued orders, transferred the Sports Village building at Gachibowli, along with appurtenant land of 9 Acres 16 Gunta, to the Health, Medical and Family Welfare Department to develop it as an exclusive COVID-19 Hospital to begin with and then to develop as a Multi–Specialty Hospital cum Premier Medical College.

In fall 2023, the facility shrank, no longer accepting inpatients, and treating outpatients with a small staff. The final fate of the medical facility has yet to be decided.
