= Statue of Mahatma Gandhi, Pietermaritzburg =

Statue in Pietermaritzburg, South Africa

Statue of Mahatma Gandhi
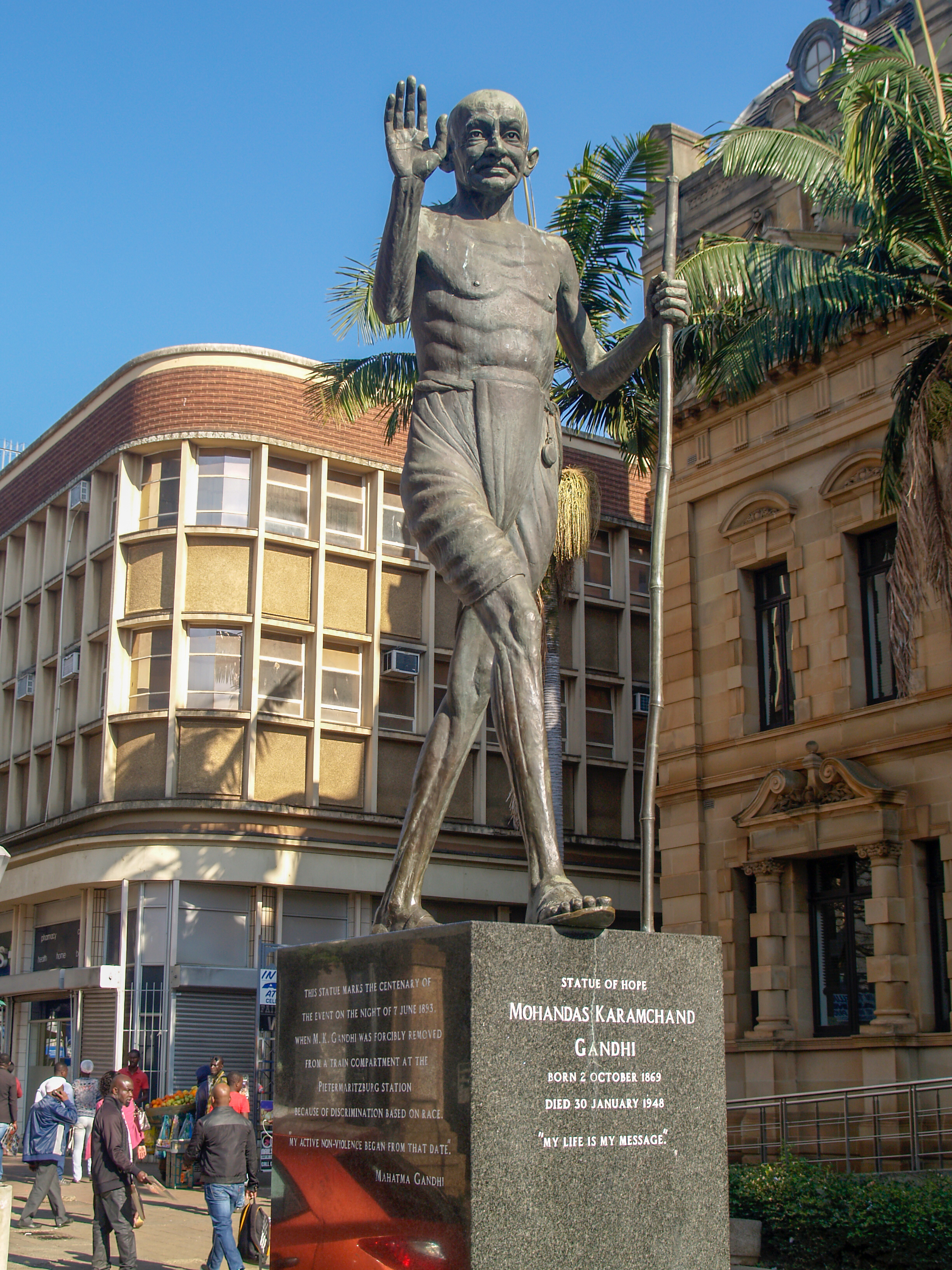

- Year: 1993
- Subject: Mahatma Gandhi
- Location: Church Street, Pietermaritzburg; 29°36′07″S 30°22′42″E

Mahatma Gandhi is a bronze statue of Mahatma Gandhi in Church Street, Pietermaritzburg, depicting the Indian independence campaigner and nonviolent pacifist as a young man.

The statue was unveiled in 1993 by Archbishop Desmond Tutu, marking the centenary since Gandhi was thrown from a train at Pietermaritzburg railway station.
