= Rajiv Gandhi National Park =

Rajiv Gandhi National Park may refer to any of the following national parks in India:

- Mukundara Hills Tiger Reserve in Rajasthan
- Nagarhole National Park in Karnataka
- Orang National Park in Assam
- Rajiv Gandhi National Park (Rameswaram) in Andhra Pradesh
