= Gandhi Temple, Bhatara =

Temple dedicated to Mahatma Gandhi

Religion
- Affiliation: Gandhism

Location
- Location: Bhatara, Sambalpur
- State: Odisha
- Country: India

Gandhi Temple built in 1974 is situated at Bhatara in Sambalpur district of the state of Odisha on the eastern coast of India. This temple is dedicated to Mahatma Gandhi. This is the first temple of India, dedicated to Gandhiji.

== History ==
In the 1960 decade Untouchability was still prevailing in Sambalpur. To stop this heinous practice of untouchability the villagers of Bhatara decided to construct a Gandhi Temple in their village. Abhimanyu Kumar, a former legislator of Rairakhol assembly constituency too the lead and was supported by all the villagers. The foundation stone of the temple was laid on 23 March 1971 and the temple was formally open by then Chief Minister of Odisha Nandini Satpathy on 11 April 1974.

== Deity and temple rituals ==
A bronze idol of Gandhiji of height 3.5 ft is installed in the temple. Ashoka Stambha, the State Emblem of India is placed at the entrance of the temple. Tiranga, the tri-colour national flag of India is waved on the shikhara of the temple. The statue inside the temple is being worshiped by a dalit priest every day. Gandhiji's favourite scriptures Bhagavad Gita and Ram Dhun are read every morning and evening. Republic Day, Independence Day and Gandhi Jayanti are celebrated as special occasions here.

== Location ==
The temple is located within a distance of 500m from the National Highway No 53. Jharsuguda Airport is 61 km and Kshetarajpur railway station is 10 km away from the temple. The temple is well connected to the district headquarter of Sambalpur via road.
