= Mahatma Gandhi Memorial Hospital (Bhojpur) =

Hospital in Bhojpur, Nepal

Geography
- Location: Bhojpur, Koshi Province, Nepal

Organisation
- Funding: Public hospital
- Type: District General
- Patron: Government of India

Services
- Emergency department: Yes
- Beds: 15 beds

History
- Opened: 17 March 2022

Mahatma Gandhi Memorial Hospital is a hospital built with the assistance of the Government of India in the Bhojpur District, Nepal, Koshi Province, Nepal.

== History ==
It was jointly inaugurated by the Indian Deputy Chief of Mission, Namgya C Khampa and the then Minister of Information and Communications of Nepal, Gyanendra Bahadur Karki on 17 March 2022.

== Services ==
The following services are provided by the hospital:

- Indoor Ward
- Maternity
- Pharmacy Unit
- Pathology Department
- General Surgery
- General Medicine
- pediatrics
