= Gandhi Vidya Mandir =

Coordinates: 28°45′23″N 74°49′03″E

- Motto: "May The Sun of Knowledge Shine"
- Type: Public
- Established: 1930's
- Founders: Shri Kanhaiyalal Dugar
- Vice-Chancellor: Prof. (Dr) R N Sharma
- Students: 10,000 Resident & Non-Resident
- Location: Sardarsahar, Rajasthan, India
- Campus: Rural
- Website: www.gandhividyamandir.org.in

The Gandhi Vidya Mandir is a non-profit-motive making registered society located in the Thar Desert, near the town of Sardarshahr in India's north-western state of Rajasthan. The Gandhi Vidya Mandir was founded in 1950. It has sponsored many schools and Institutes.

== History ==
The Gandhi Vidya Mandir was established in 1950 envisioned by Shri Kanhaiyalal Dugar, on the Gandhian ideals, who later embraced sainthood. In 1950 it stood on a 1000-acre land on one of the harshest and backward terrains in India. Conceived as India's first rural university, the foundation stone was laid by India's first president, Dr. Rajendra Prasad GVM was moulded as a university and education started through its Basic Teacher's Training College in 1953, postgraduate studies in 1958 and the facility of Ph.D. in 1968. Thereafter, the IASE was formed under the Centrally Sponsored Scheme of Education in 1993. In 2002, the Government of India and UGC formally recognized the IASE as a Deemed University. Between the year 1986–1989 the GVM with funding from NCERT and NIEPA did a series of projects, seminars and researches in the area of changes to be made in Education curricula and especially Teachers’ Education for making it more rural oriented. In 1987 G.V.M. in collaboration with NCERT and India International Centre drafted a Blue Print of Rural Education for development. Many of the recommendations made are still being implemented by the Government. The first lesson was delivered by the Saint-poet Shri Viyogi Hari in 1952, to three students. There are about 10,000 students on a campus of 1,200 acres, today.

== Institutes and schools under GVM ==
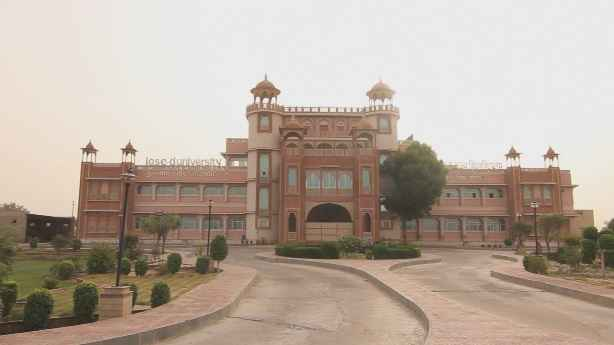
The IASE is a Deemed University The Gandhi Vidya Mandir was founded in 1950 and worked as a non-governmental, non-profit-motive making registered society which sponsored the IASE.

=== Institutes ===
1. Basic Teacher Training College :
2. IASE Institute of Advance Studies in Education:
3. Department of Life Sciences: With the combination of Biological Science and Technology, the Department of Life Sciences was formed.
4. Shri Bhanwar Lal Dugar Ayurved Vishwa Bharti (Ayurvedic Medical College & Hospital) Women's College of Arts, Commerce, Science and Home Science.
5. Faculty of Physiotherapy and Allied Medical Sciences.
6. Department of Veterinary & Animal Sciences.
7. Krishi Vigyan Kendra (KVK) for the training of farmers.
8. Institute of Global Harmony.

=== Schools ===
1. Meera Niketan Senior Secondary School for Girls.
2. Basic Senior Secondary School for Boys.
3. Seth Sampatram Dugar Senior Secondary School for Boys.
4. Basic Public School (CBSE board, English School).
5. Balbari – Montessori school.
