= Gandhi Square =

Plaza in Central Business District, Johannesburg, South Africa

Coordinates: 26°12′24″S 28°02′35″E

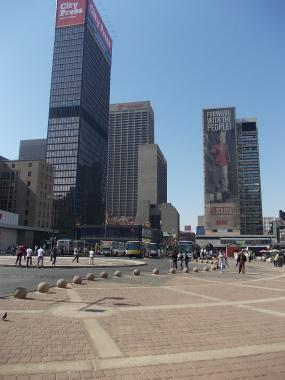
Gandhi Square Johannesburg

Gandhi Square (formerly Van Der Bijl Square and Government Square) is a plaza located in the Central Business District of Johannesburg, South Africa. It is named after the political activist and pacifist, Mahatma Gandhi.

== History ==
In 1900 on what was then called Government Square near the Court House, on 31 May Field Marshal Roberts accepted the surrender of the city from Z.A.R. Commandant, Dr. F.E.T. Krause. Judge Krause had been put in command of the city and had earlier prevented the dynamiting of the goldmines. The British allowed them a day to evacuate Johannesburg provided they did not set off the mines.

The square is just off Rissik Street and it was a corner of Rissik and Anderson that Mahatma Gandhi once had his legal offices. A statue of Gandhi was erected in the square in October 2003.

Before it was named Gandhi Square, Van Der Bijl square was falling apart. It was in the centre of one of Johannesburg's most destitute neighbourhoods. Then, in the early 1990s, Gerald Olitzki, a property developer, approached the government with the project. Although initially denied, the project was eventually undertaken with the support of the government, and was finished in 2002, at a cost of approximately R2 million. The local bus terminal has also been renovated, as there is now 24-hour security, and many of the shops along the square have returned.
