= A J Institute of Medical Science =

Coordinates: 12.86936°N 74.84256°E

AJ Institute of Medical Science is a medical college in Mangaluru with an annual intake of 150 students. The college is an offshoot of A J Hospital and Research centre.

== History ==
The college is promoted by industrialist A.J. Shetty. The college was established on 21 October 2002. This college is situated at Kuntikana junction on NH-66. The medical college is currently affiliated with RGUHS and recognized by the National Medical Commission. The first batch passed out of final MBBS in February 2007 and completed internship on 2008.

The college has post-graduate courses including M.D. and M.S. degrees in various departments like Anatomy, Physiology, Biochemistry, Forensic Medicine & Toxicology, Pharmacology, Pathology, Microbiology, Community Medicine, ENT, Ophthalmology, Dermatology, PTCD, Anaesthesiology, Radiology, General Medicine, General Surgery, Paediatrics, and Obstetrics & Gynecology. Prashanth Shetty is the Director of AJIMS.

A J Institute of Medical Science is equipped with campus management software for automation of workflow processes and has thus enhanced communication and user experience for the students, faculty and parents as well.

A 2020 pandemic controversy highlighted that the college was withholding the full stipend for the post-graduate doctors. While the administration denied any discrepancy, evidence of doctors working under-risk conditions without full payment came up.
