= Statue of Mahatma Gandhi, Accra =

Statue in Accra, Ghana

Statue of Mahatma Gandhi
- Subject: Mahatma Gandhi
- Location: AITI-KACE; Accra

In 2016, a statue of Mahatma Gandhi was installed at the University of Ghana in Accra. It was relocated in 2018 to a more prestigious location at the AITI-KACE.

Upon the unveiling of the statue at AITI-KACE, Ghanaian foreign minister Shirley Ayorkor Botchwey hailed Gandhi as a "great son" of India, who is admired across the world for being one of the most inspirational figures.

== See also ==
- List of artistic depictions of Mahatma Gandhi
