= Rajarajeswari Medical College and Hospital =

Medical college in India

- Type: Private
- Established: 2005
- Affiliations: Dr.M.G.R Education and research institute
- Chairman: A. C. Shanmugam
- Director: Dr. D. L. Rama Chandra
- Location: Bengaluru, Karnataka, India; 12.896255°N 77.461852°E
- Campus: 25 acres (10 ha), Mysore Road
- Website: www.rrmch.org www.drmgrdu.ac.in

The Rajarajeswari Medical College and Hospital (RRMCH) was set up by the Moogambigai Charitable and Educational Trust and is situated on Mysuru Road, Bengaluru. The Moogambigai Charitable and Educational Trust serves to develop as a renowned educational institution in the fields of Engineering, Medicine, Dental, Paramedical, Management and other sciences with a special infrastructure for health related issues. The Rajarajeswari Medical College and Hospital

The Rajarajeswari Medical College and Hospital is situated in the serene 25 acre campus in South-West Bengaluru. Rajarajeswari Medical College and Hospital has been approved and recognized by National Medical Commission and Ministry of Health and Family Welfare and is affiliated to Dr.M.G.R Education and research institute deemed to be university, Tamilnadu.

== Healthcare ==
The Rajarajeswari Medical College Hospital offers Super Specialty clinics in cardiology, plastic surgery, orthopedic Surgery, pediatric surgery, endocrinology, neurology, and nephrology.

It offers various treatments such as dysplasia, Coronary angiogram, Coronary angioplasty, IVC filter placement, renal angiogram, Pediatric Minimally invasive surgery, Laparoscopic and Single Incision Laparoscopic Surgery (SILS), neonatal surgery, cosmetic plastic surgery and aesthetic enhancement, oncologic reconstruction procedures, paediatric neurosurgery, and dialysis.

The hospital offers comprehensive critical care facilities with an 18 bedded ICU, 6 beds each are devoted to MICU, SICU and ICCU. The hospital offers 24/7 ambulance, casualty, eye bank, Pharmacy, Blood bank, and Laboratory Services.

== Education ==
The college has Ground + 5 floors and offers UG, PG and super specialty courses in various disciplines. With a massive built area of 40,000 sqft, the Central Library stocks more than 10,000 volumes in medical and allied health sciences. Both Indian and foreign journals are subscribed to and are pretty much available at the departmental libraries. The Wi-Fi enabled Digital library is available where the students can refer to thousands online volumes through Helinet.

The Medical Museum at RRMCH comprises 350 dissected specimens and more than 1000 models that enable students to add an extra dimension to medical learning.

== Highlights ==
Since 2006, functions held at RajaRajeswari Medical College and Hospital have attracted notable guests. These include Dr. Madhavan Nair former ISRO chief, Mr. H. Muniyappa, Minister of State for Railway Ministry, Bharat Ratna Dr. Abdul Kalam Mr. Anil Kumble, and Dr. Ian Anderson and Dr. Francis G. Dunn, former chairmen of the Royal College of Physicians and Surgeons.

== Professional memberships ==
RRMCH is an institutional member of IMSA, International medical Sciences Academy which is a body aiming to provide enhanced medical care globally. The college has entered into student exchange programs with Hammersmith University – UK besides others like Mayo Clinic – US, Royal College of Physicians and Surgeons, Glasgow, UK. RRMCH has also entered into an MOU with Melbourne University Australia, RAK University, Middle East.

== Conferences organized ==
Rajarajeswari Medical College and Hospital were privy to host a number of National and International conferences.

- AIMA 2012, IMSACON 2012, KISACON 2013, IMSACON 2011
