= Statue of Mahatma Gandhi, Johannesburg =

Statue in Johannesburg

Statue of Mahatma Gandhi
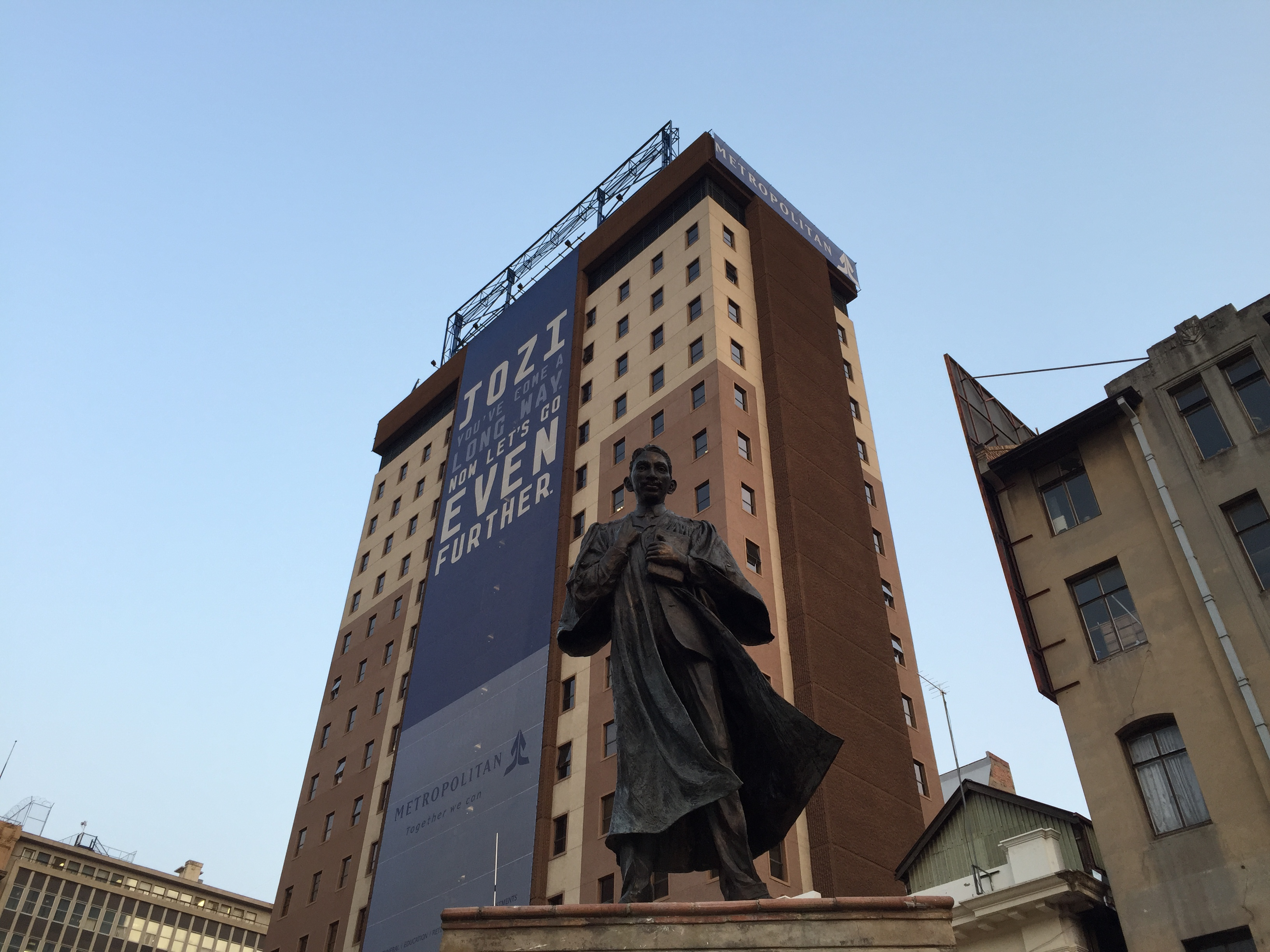
- The statue of Gandhi in 2004.

- Location within South Africa
- Artist: Tinka Christopher
- Year: 2003
- Subject: Mahatma Gandhi
- Location: Gandhi Square, Johannesburg; 26°12′23″S 28°02′35″E

M. K. Gandhi is a bronze statue of Mahatma Gandhi in Gandhi Square, Johannesburg, which depicts the Indian independence campaigner and nonviolent pacifist as a young man.

== Description and history ==
Prior to the statue's unveiling, the site was known as Government Square and housed the Johannesburg Law Courts, where Gandhi practiced law. The statue was unveiled on October 2, 2003, Gandhi's birth anniversary, by Johannesburg Mayor Amos Masondo. The main Johannesburg bus terminus now stands on the former courthouse location.

Tinka Christopher was chosen as the statue's sculptor by the advisory committee of the Johannesburg Art Gallery. The piece took Christopher three months to complete, with Christopher saying that she worked "...worked 10 hours each day, seven days a week, to complete the work in time". The other shortlisted artists were Naomi Jacobson, Ben Omar, and Maureen Quin.

The bronze statue is mounted on a 5-metre (16 ft) high plinth surrounded by benches. It depicts Gandhi as a young man during his years in Johannesburg. He is shown looking forward and holding a book, wearing a legal gown over his suit with its cloak billowing in the breeze. To prevent theft and vandalism, the statue is equipped with an anti-vibration alarm system monitored by a private security company.

The statue was half funded by the city of Johannesburg, with the remainder coming from private donations.

== See also ==
- List of artistic depictions of Mahatma Gandhi
