= Mahatma Gandhi Memorial (Milwaukee) =

- Artist: Gautam Pal
- Year: 2002
- Type: Bronze sculpture
- Dimensions: 260 cm (104 in)
- Location: Milwaukee County Courthouse; Milwaukee, Wisconsin, U.S.; 43°2′29.759″N 87°55′23.847″W
- Owner: Milwaukee County

The Mahatma Gandhi Memorial is a 2002 public sculpture by Gautam Pal located at the Milwaukee County Courthouse in downtown Milwaukee, Wisconsin, United States.

== Description ==
The 8 ft 8 in (2.64 m) sculpture depicts Indian civil rights leader Mahatma Gandhi dressed in traditional attire and walking with a long staff. His head is bald, and his chest, shoulders, and legs are bare. He wears glasses and his gaze is directed toward the path he is walking. He wears sandals. The figure is oriented away from the Courthouse, appearing to walk eastward toward downtown and Lake Michigan. The Mahatma Gandhi Memorial in Washington, D.C. includes a similar statue by Gautama Pal, also mounted on a red granite plinth.

The sculpture stands on a tapered red granite base on which bronze plaques are mounted on four sides to display texts. Placement between Courthouse doors labeled "TRUTH" and "JUSTICE" reinforces the message of the sculpture.

== Historical information ==
The Wisconsin Coalition of Asian Indian Organizations (WCAIO) raised $12,000 for the sculpture and its installation. WCAIO represents 16 Indian American groups in the Milwaukee area. The Indian Council for Cultural Relations also provided support. Kumar Dhaliwal, retired dean of the Marquette University School of Dentistry, and his wife Darshan led the campaign to bring the sculpture to Milwaukee and donated $25,000. Dhaliwal told the India-West newspaper, "Mahatma Gandhi's messages are not only of importance to prevent violence in the world, but also domestic violence and violence in the streets."

Milwaukee County accepted the offer to donate the sculpture and initially proposed ten possible sites. The Indian American community selected the site at MacArthur Square because "it's a beautiful, serene setting."

The sculpture was unveiled on October 5, 2002, and the dedication event included a peace march, speeches by Wisconsin elected officials and Indian Ambassador Lalit Mansingh, and singing of bhajans. According to the India-West Newspaper, 850 people attended the dedication.

The sculpture is a gathering place for the local Indian American community and for peace activists holding vigils.

== See also ==
- List of artistic depictions of Mahatma Gandhi
