= Mahatma Gandhi Central University =

Central university in Motihari, Bihar, India

Coordinates: 26.6468°N 84.9060°E

- Motto: मयि श्रीः श्रयतां ‌यशः (I be blessed with prosperity, name and fame)
- Type: Public
- Established: 2016 (10 years ago)
- Affiliations: UGC
- Chancellor: Dr. Mahesh Sharma
- Vice-Chancellor: Sanjay Srivastava
- Visitor: President of India
- Location: Motihari, Bihar, India
- Campus: Urban
- Website: www.mgcub.ac.in

Mahatma Gandhi Central University (MGCU), is a central university located in Motihari, Bihar, India. MGCU has 7 schools and 20 academic departments.

== History ==
The Central Universities (Amendment) Act, 2014 which received presidential assent on 17 December 2014, provided for the establishment of Mahatma Gandhi Central University having its territorial jurisdiction extending to the territory in the North of the River Ganges in the State of Bihar.

This is the second Central University in Bihar after the Central University of South Bihar (CUSB).

== Organisation and administration ==
=== Governance ===
The university is governed by the rules set by the Central Universities Act, 2009. The president of India is the visitor of the university. The chancellor is the ceremonial head of the university while the executive powers rest with the vice-chancellor. The court, the executive council, the academic council, the board of studies and the finance committee are the administrative authorities of the university.

=== Schools and departments ===
The university has 7 schools and 20 departments covering wide range of subjects such as commerce, management, computer science, education, humanities, languages, life sciences, physical sciences, and social sciences.

== Academics ==
=== Admission ===
The university admits students to various UG, PG, and PhD programmes through the Entrance exam conducted by the university itself. Entrance Exam held annually on various exam centres across India.

=== Library ===
Atal Bihari Vajpayee Central Library (a learning resource centre) of Mahatma Gandhi Central University was established in the year 2016. The university library has more than 26000+ books, 13 magazines, 11 newspapers and 125+ donated book which providing access to scholarly information, research support and study facilities to the teaching and non-teaching staff, students and research scholars.

== Controversies ==
In 2017, the university terminated two assistant professors without citing any prior notice, which caused heavy protest by the students of university. In June 2018, students of the university launched heavy protest after the university increased fees. Later that month, faculty members sat on hunger strike after the university issued a show cause notice to a professor.

In August 2018, Sanjay Kumar, an assistant professor of the university, was attacked by BJP/RSS led goons for criticising Ex Prime Minister Atal Bihari Vajpayee in a Facebook post. This led to the closure of the university for a 15-day period.

In October 2018, the vice-chancellor of the university, Arvind Kumar Agrawal, was accused of some anomalies in his educational qualifications. This led to his resignation a week later, and the appointment of the pro-chancellor Anil Kumar Rai for the position.
