= MV Hannington Court =

History
- Name: Hannington Court (1954–63); Gandhi Jayanti (1963–74); Gandhi (1974-76)
- Owner: Court Line Ltd. (1954–63); Jayanti Shipping Co. Ltd (1963–67); Shipping Corp of India Ltd (1967-76)
- Operator: Haldin & Co. (1954–63); Jayanti Shipping Co. Ltd (1963–67); Shipping Corp of India Ltd (1967-76)
- Builder: Bartram & Sons Ltd, Sunderland
- Yard number: 342
- Launched: 19 July 1954
- Completed: December 1954
- Identification: UK official number 186168
- Fate: Scrapped in 1976

General characteristics
- Type: Cargo ship
- Tonnage: 6,266 GRT; 3,467 NRT
- Length: 476 feet (145 m)
- Beam: 62 feet (19 m)
- Depth: 27 feet (8.2 m)
- Propulsion: 6 cylinder 4-stroke cycle single-acting Burmeister & Wain oil engine; single screw
- Speed: 12.5 knots (23.2 km/h)

MV Hannington Court was a cargo ship of the Court Line. Launched in 1954 as part of the company's rebuilding programme after the Second World War, she sailed for a number of years before being sold to an Indian company in 1963 and renamed Gandhi Jayanti. She was again sold in 1967, was renamed Gandhi in 1974, and was scrapped in 1976.

== Career ==
Hannington Court was the third ship of the name to sail for the company. Built by Bartram & Sons Ltd, Sunderland and launched on 19 July 1954, she was completed in December 1954. Measuring 6,266 GRT, she was 476 feet (145 m) long, had a beam of 62 feet (19 m) and a depth of 27 feet (8.2 m). A 6 cylinder 4-stroke cycle single-acting Burmeister & Wain oil engine drove a single screw, allowing her to make 12.5 knots (23.2 km/h).

Hannington Court sailed for the Court Line, under the management of Haldin & Company, until 1963, when she was sold to the Indian shipping company Jayanti Shipping Co. Ltd, based in Bombay. The company renamed her Gandhi Jayanti, and she spent the next four years sailing for them. Sold to Shipping Corporation of India in 1967, she retained her name until 1974, when she was renamed Gandhi. Her career almost over by this point, she sailed for another two years before being sold off for scrap. She arrived at Universal Shipbreakers Ltd, Bombay, in April 1976 and was broken up.
