= Rajiv Gandhi Institute of Technology, Kottayam =

Government engineering college in Kerala

Rajiv Gandhi Institute of Technology (Government Engineering College)
- Other name: RIT
- Type: Education and research institution
- Established: 1991; 35 years ago
- Affiliations: MG University (1991-2015); APJ Abdul Kalam Technological University (2015-present)
- Principal: Dr. Prince Ashok
- Academic staff: 200
- Undergraduates: 1500
- Postgraduates: 300
- Location: Kottayam, Kerala, India; 9°33′54″N 76°37′5″E
- Campus: 87 acres (35 ha)
- Website: rit.ac.in

Rajiv Gandhi Institute of Technology (RIT) or Government Engineering College, Kottayam (GEC Kottayam) is a state-government-owned engineering college in the Indian state of Kerala, located 14 km away from Kottayam. The college was founded in 1991 by the Government of Kerala, and has been affiliated with the APJ Abdul Kalam Technological University since the latter was founded in 2015.

== Academics ==
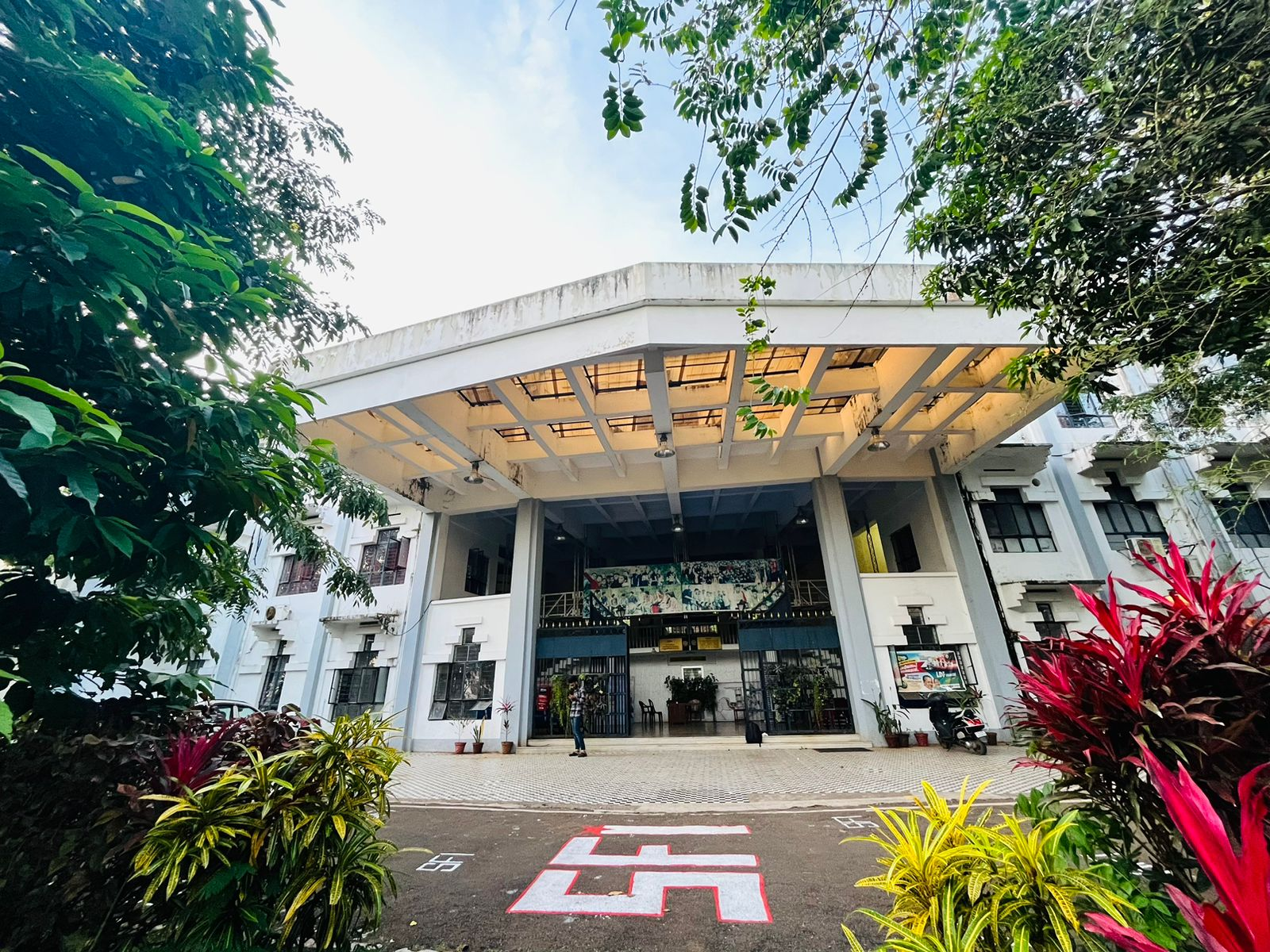
Front view of RIT Kottayam Administrative Block.

Due to its nature as an engineering college, the college offers degrees in Civil Engineering, Computer Science and Engineering, Electrical and Electronics Engineering, Electronics and Communication Engineering, Mechanical Engineering, Robotics and Artificial Intelligence Engineering, Architecture and post graduate and doctoral programs in engineering disciplines.

The university uses the Kerala Engineering Architecture Medical to screen undergraduate students and the Graduate Aptitude Test in Engineering to screen postgraduate students, with separate entrance tests for its Master of Computer Application and architecture courses.

=== ICRIT ===
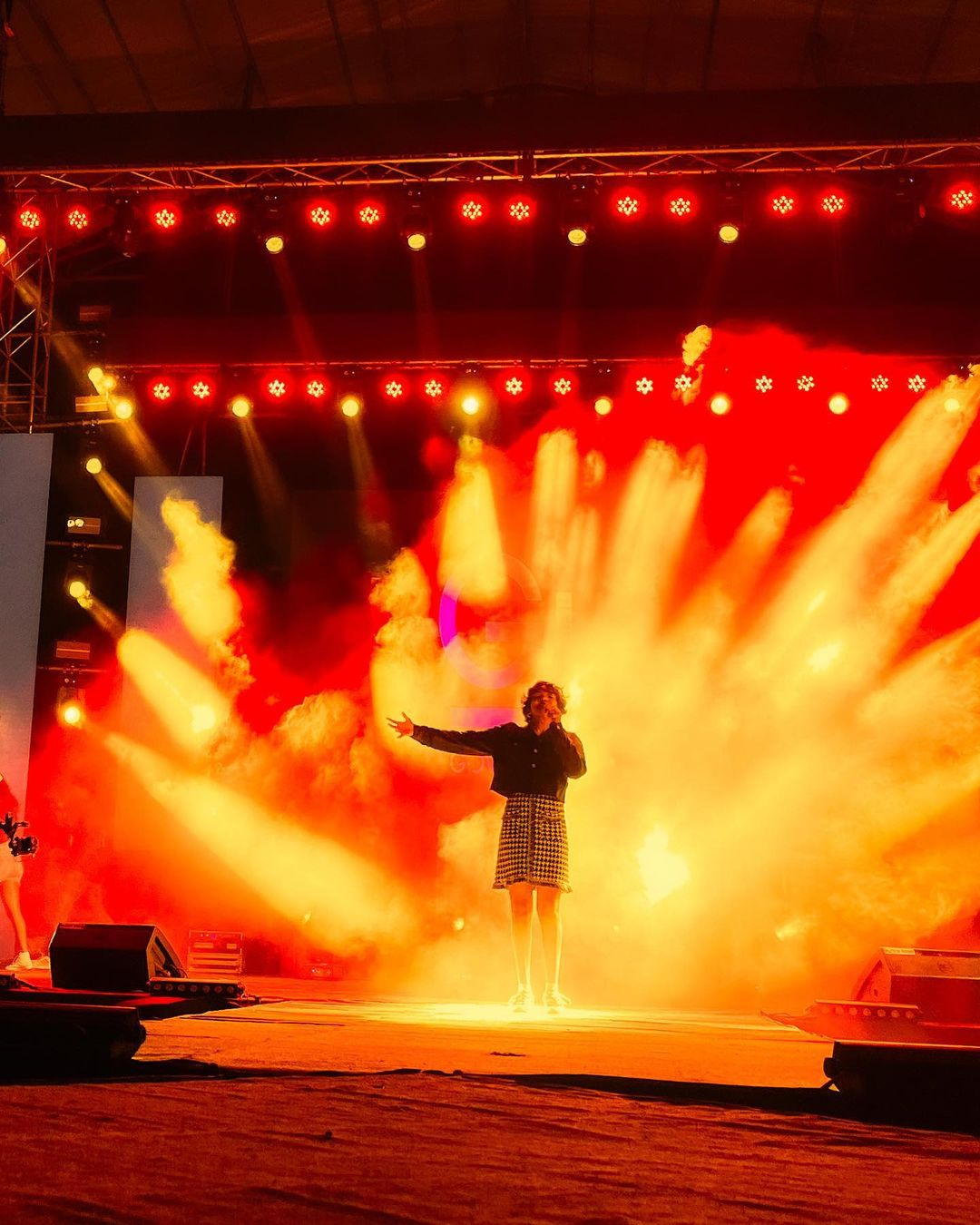
Gowry Lakshmi Performing at RIT Kottayam FEST

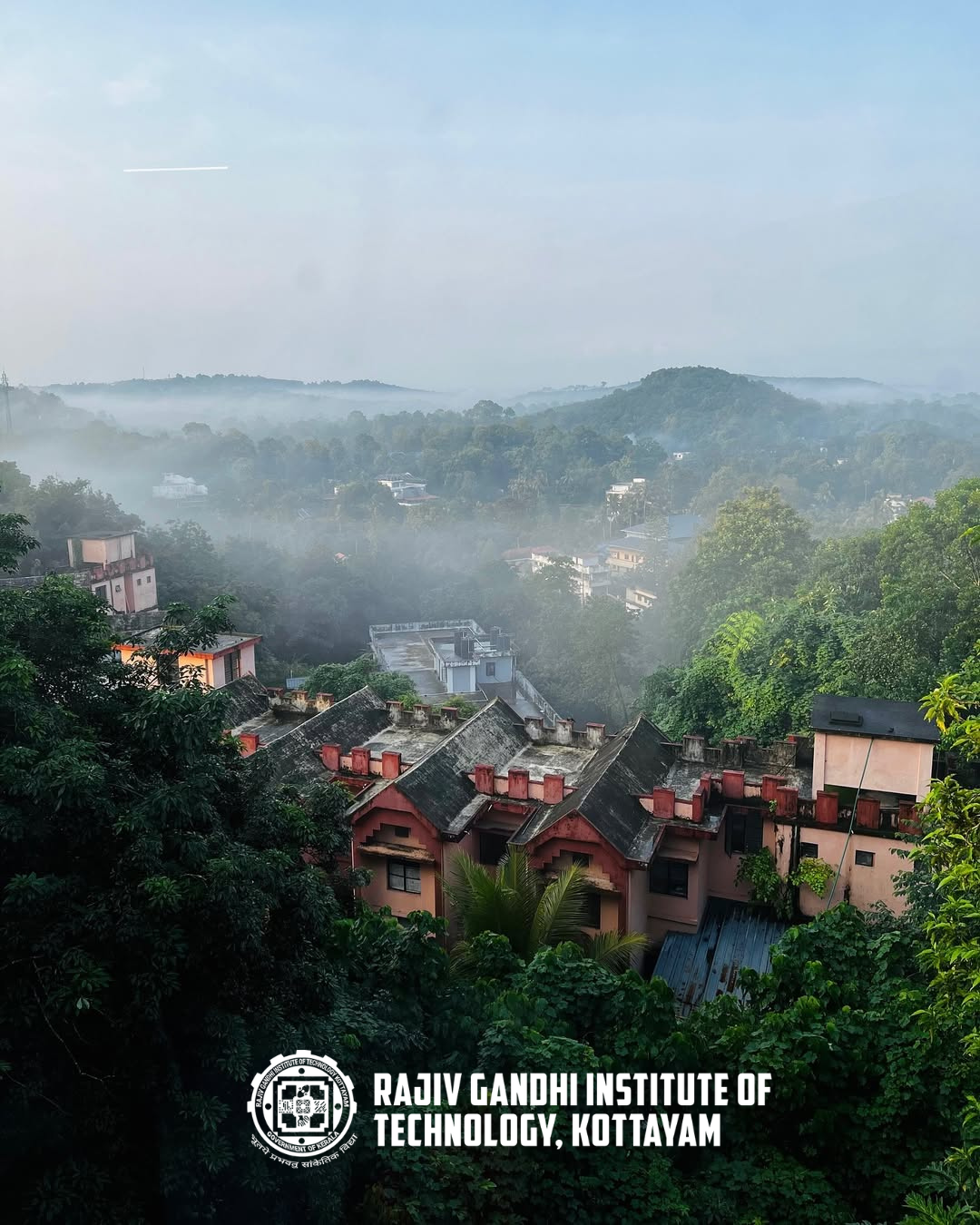
view of rit kottayam, during a foggy morning, from LH

From 2009 to 2010, the university hosted an academic conference titled the National Conference on Recent Innovations in Technology (NCRIT), which featuring paper presentations and panel discussions for professionals, academics, researchers, and industrialists. The conference topics were chosen based on trending areas of research in academia and industry. In 2011, the title was changed to International Conference on Recent Innovations in Technology (ICRIT) instead.

=== NATCON 2013 ===
RIT in association with The Centre for Engineering Research and Development (CERD), Government of Kerala, is part of the organizing team of National Technological Congress (NATCON). The conference is designed to boost research activities in engineering colleges. It will also be a platform for talented academicians, students scientists to share their experiences and knowledge. The third edition of the NATCON as held on 17–19 January 2013.

== Student Life ==
=== Student organisations & clubs ===
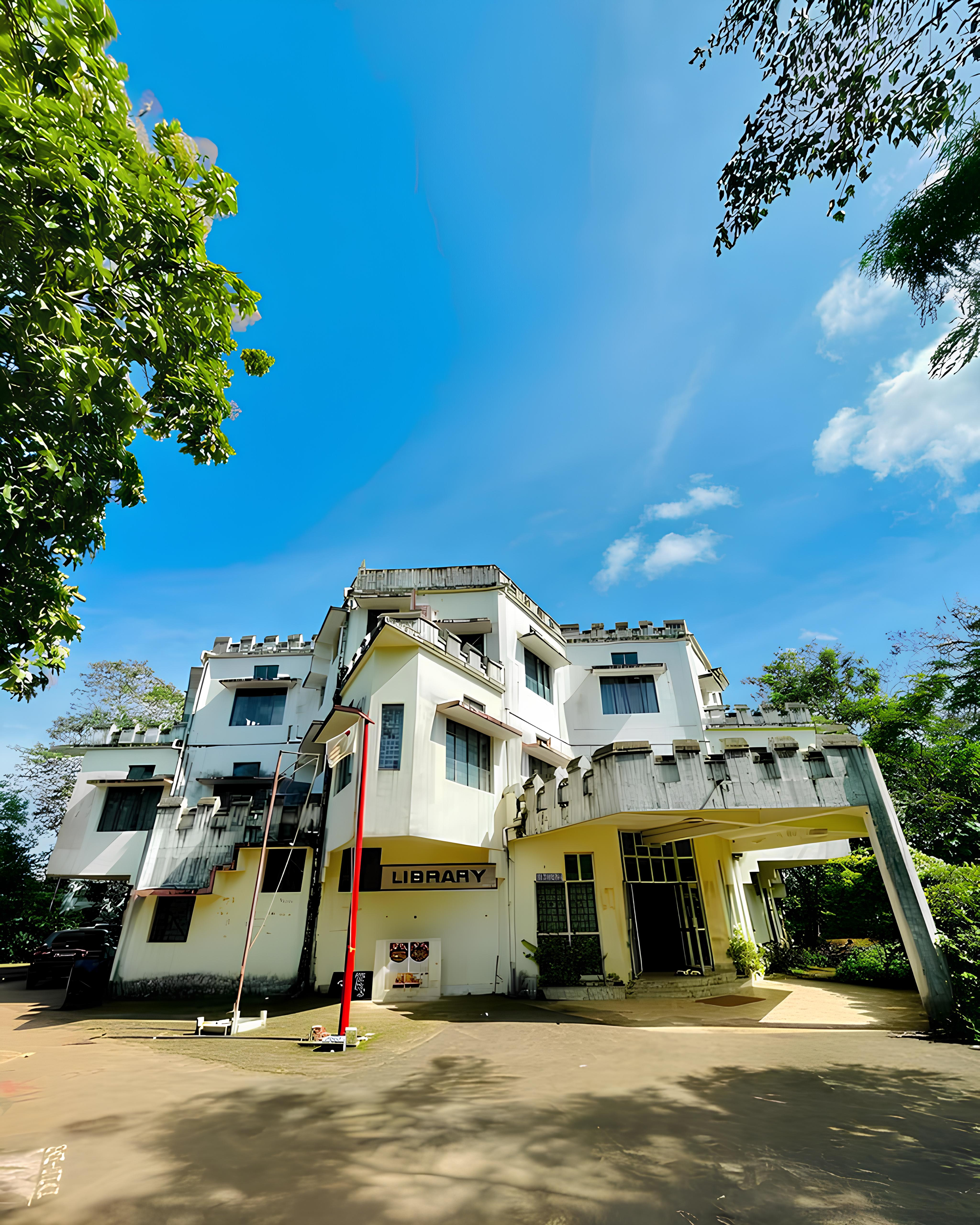
Library Of RIT

- SAE
- IEEE
- Tinker Hub
- Indian Society for Technical Education
- Astronomical Society of RIT
- BODHI, RIT Quiz Club
- IEDC Start-up Bootcamp
- National Service Scheme (NSS)
- Society of Student Architects
- RITM - RIT Music club
- Tritanz - Dance Club
- Ritunes - Radio
- PSoc - Photography Society
- Sabdika - Literary Club

=== Events ===
==== RITU ====
RITU, aka RIT Utsav is the annual techno-cultural fest of Rajiv Gandhi Institute of Technology, Kottayam. The event hosts multiple programs and competitions in technical and cultural fields. Being a prominent tech fest in kerala, Ritu attracts huge number of footfalls.

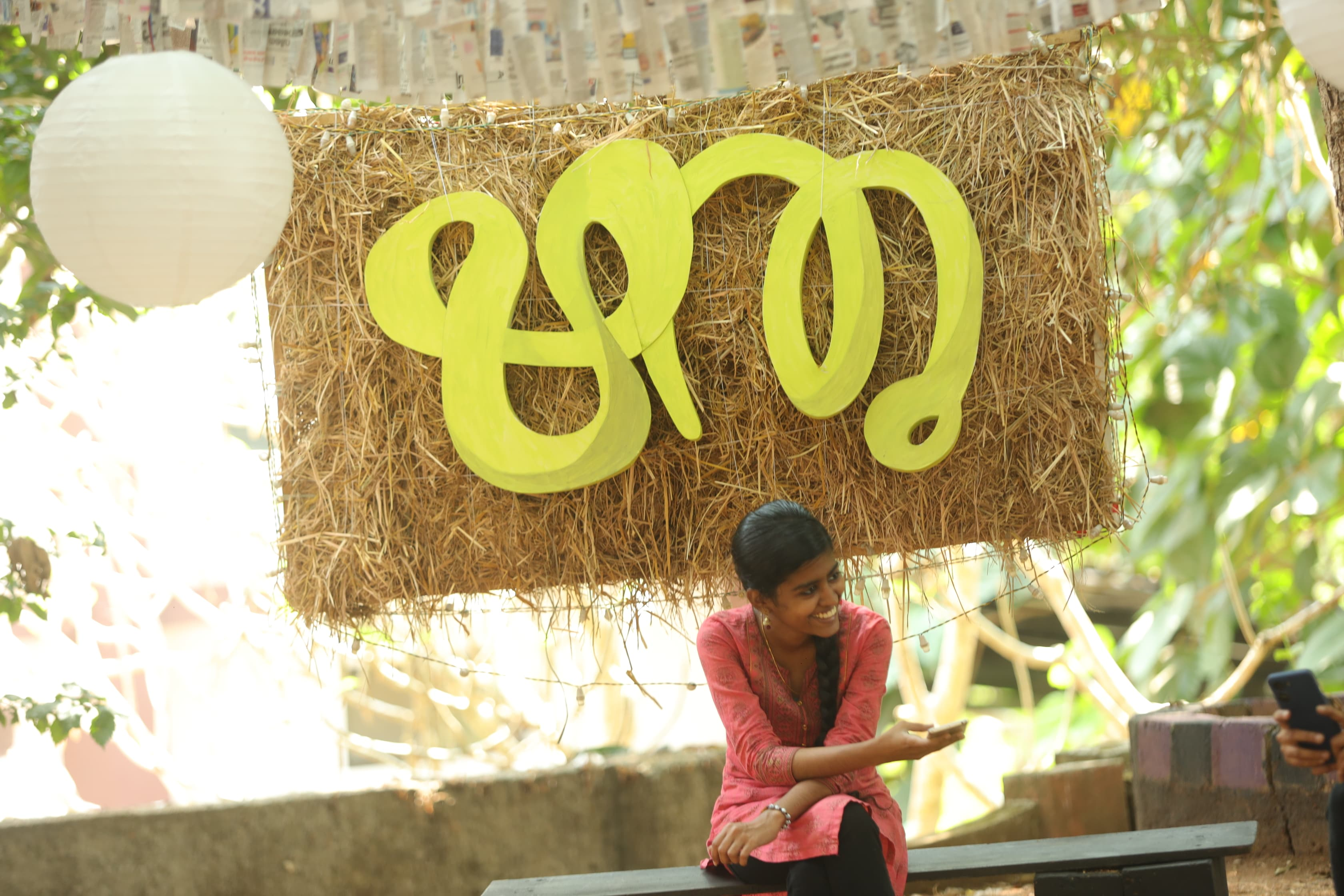
RITU 25 Glimpses RIT Kottayam

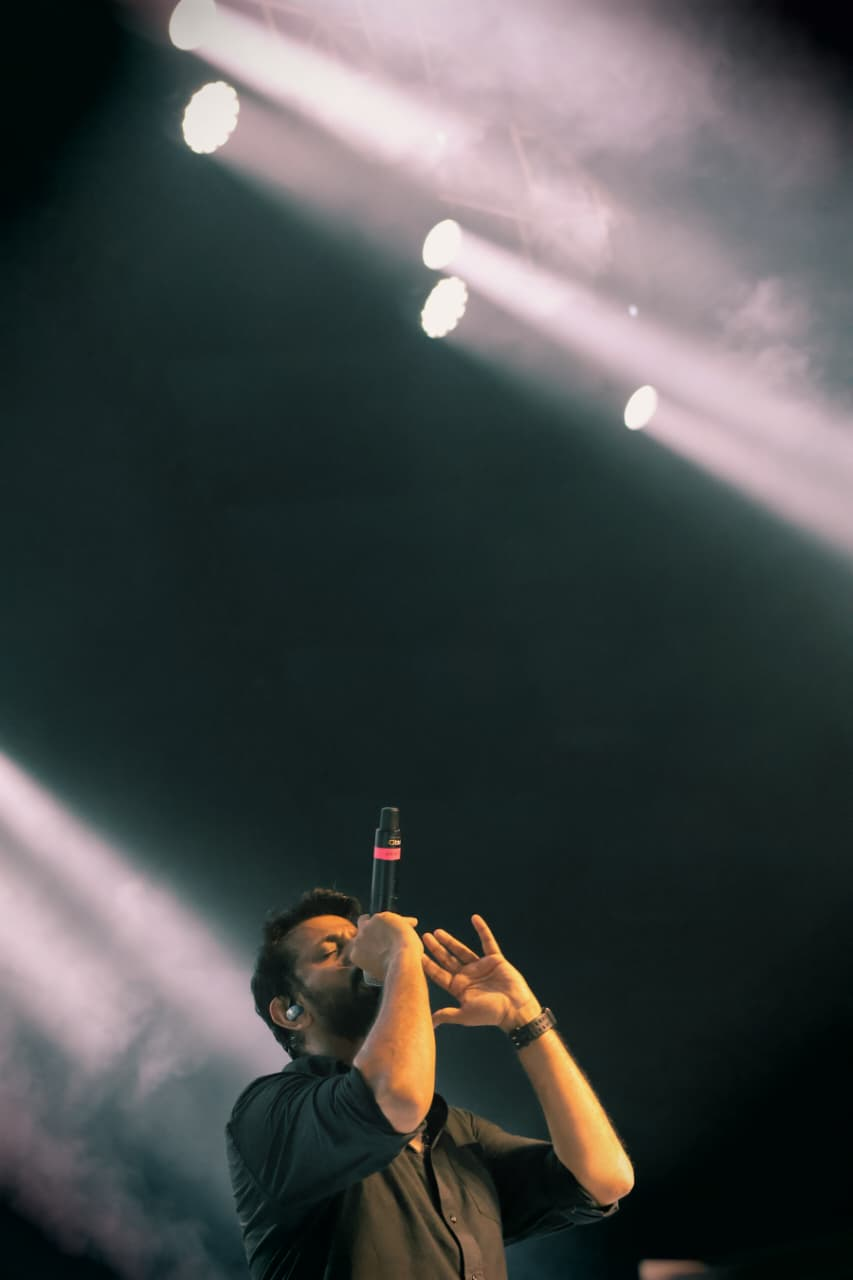
RITU 25 Glimpses RIT Kottayam

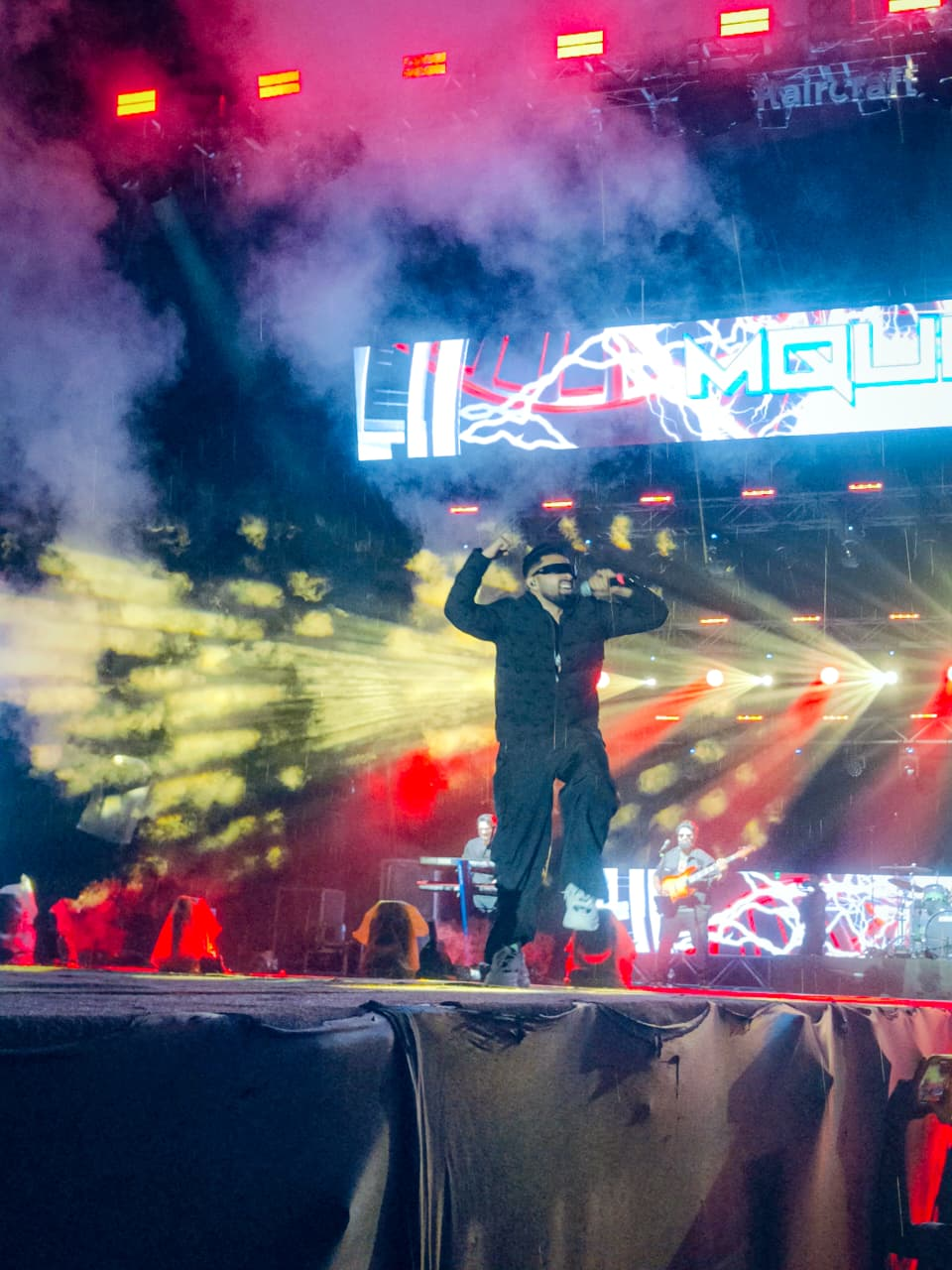
RITU 25 Glimpses RIT Kottayam

==== Keli ====
Keli is the intra-college arts festival of the college. The event is made competitive by grouping the entire college into 5 groups each named as part of a traditional piece of art, Sruthi, Noopura, Pallavi, Surabhi and Thillana.

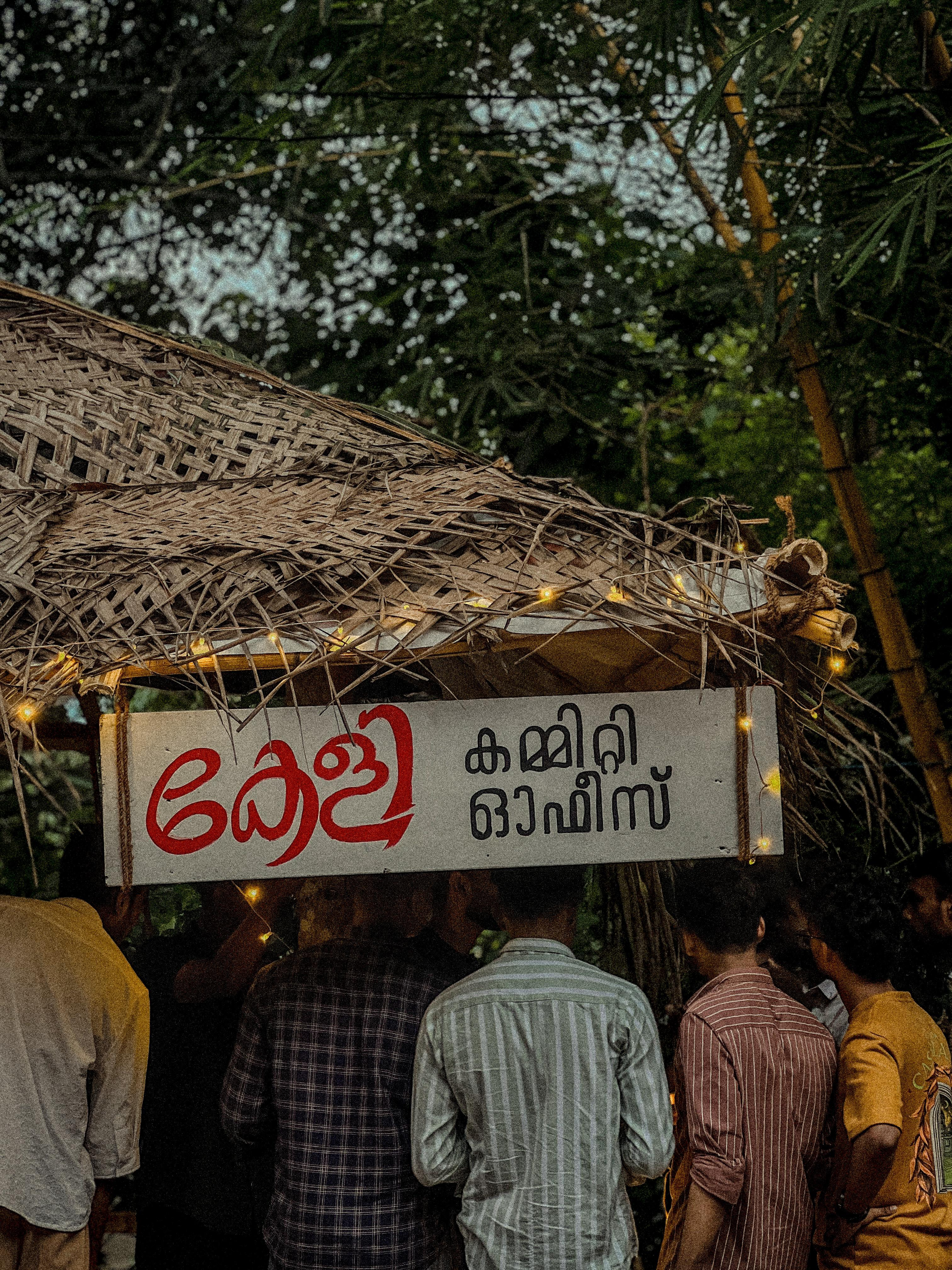
Keli ARTS FEST Glimpses RIT Kottayam

==== Aaravam ====
Aaravam is the annual Sports festival of RIT.

==== Department Fest ====
Several departments organize department festivals.

Fest name	Department
Vastheya	Civil Engineering
Ensemble	Computer Science and Engineering
Vidyuth (Previously Eniac)	Electrical and Electronics Engineering
Prominence (Previously Echo)	Electronics and Communication Engineering
Mechnova	Mechanical Engineering
Ad Astra	Computer Applications

== Gallery ==
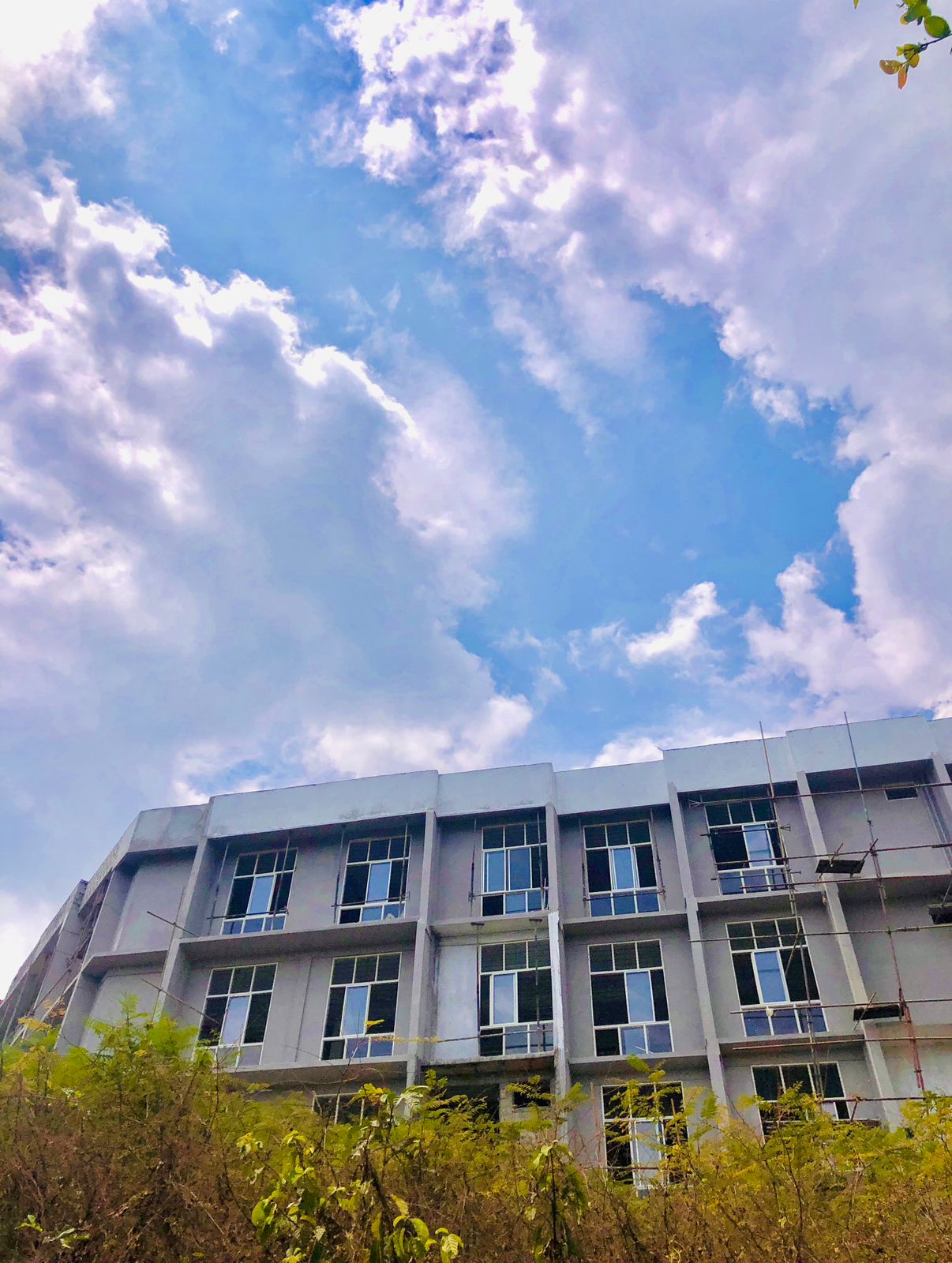
Scenic B-Arch Department RIT KOTTAYAM

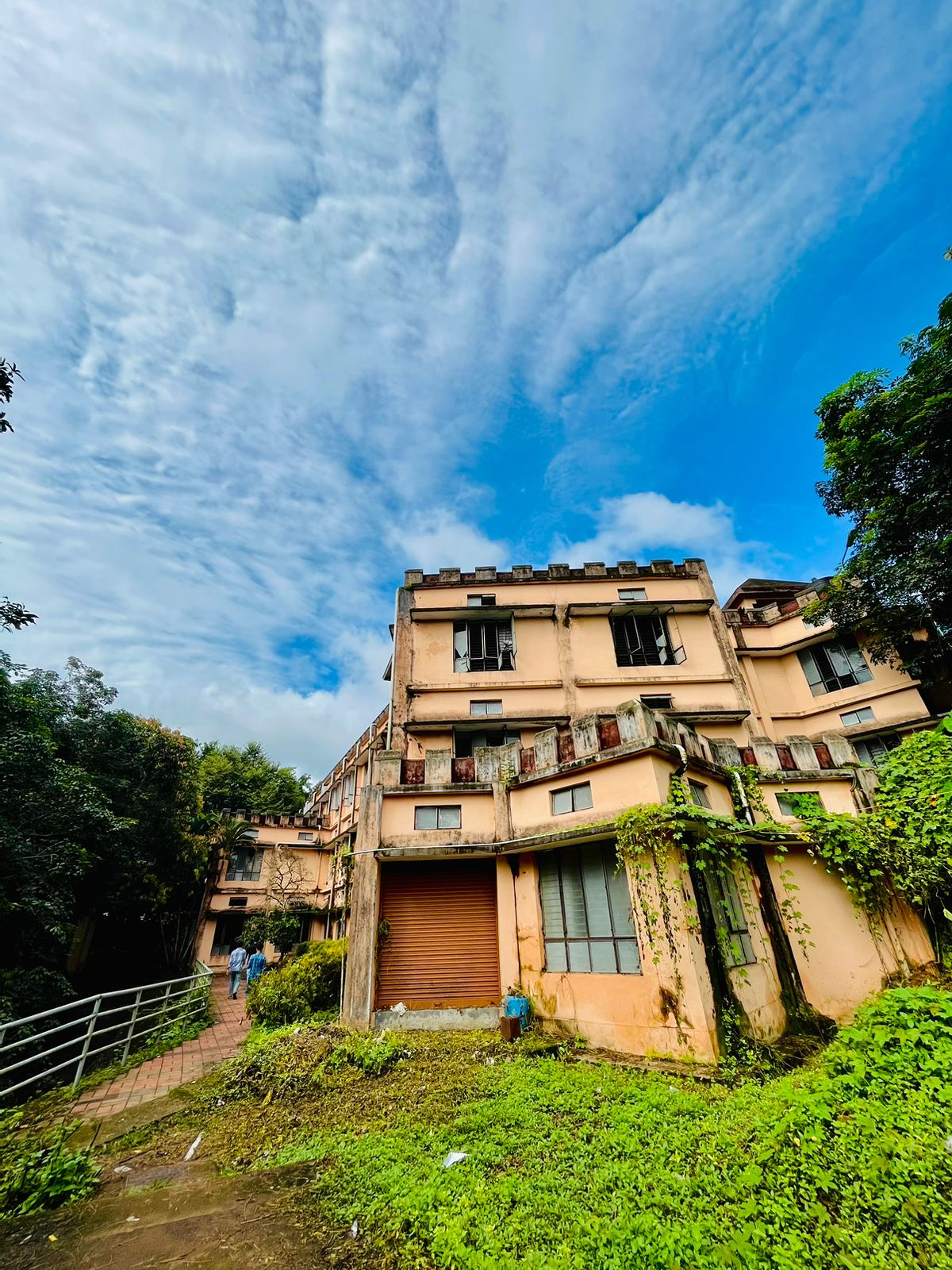
Electrical Department RIT KOTTAYAM

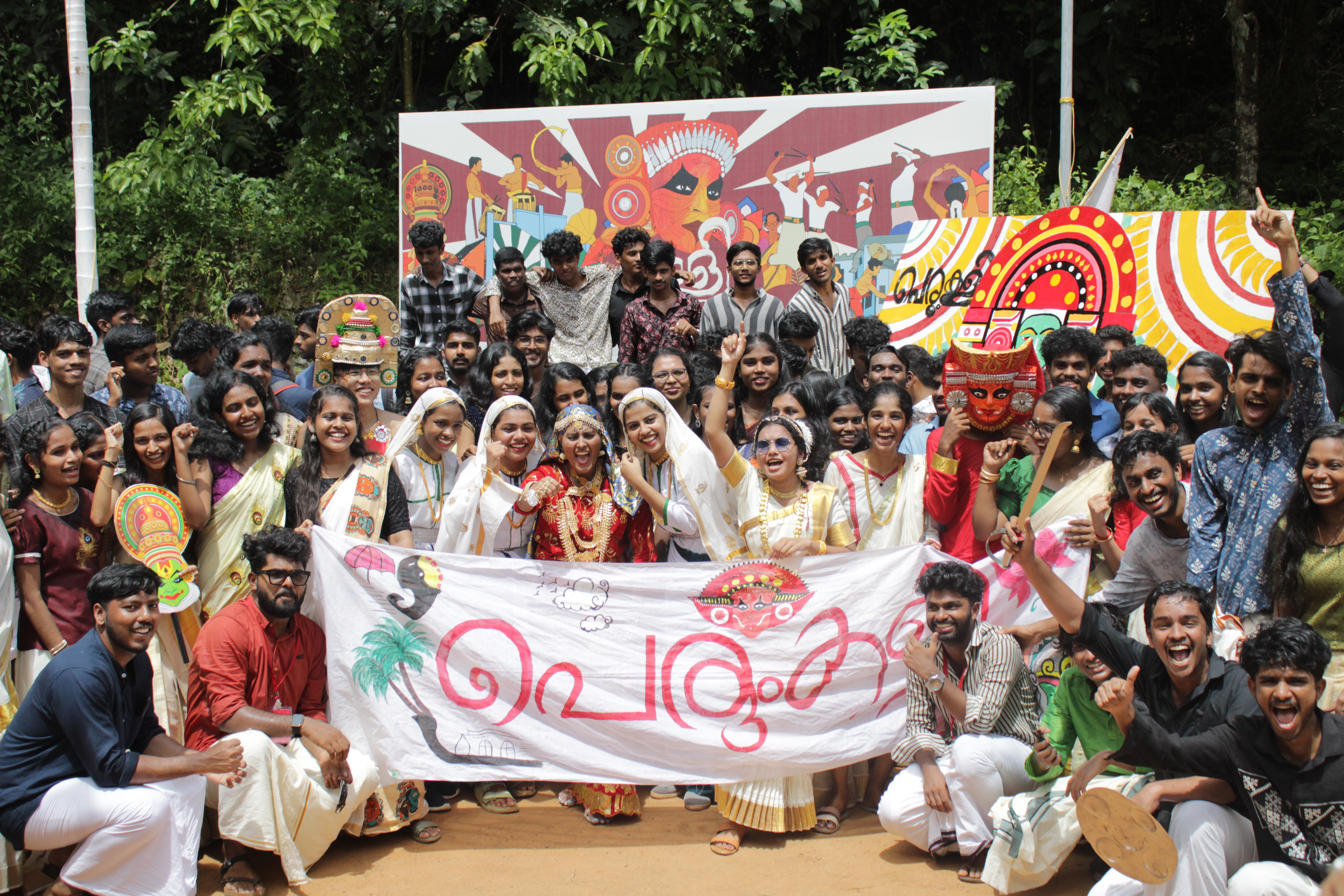
KELI 24

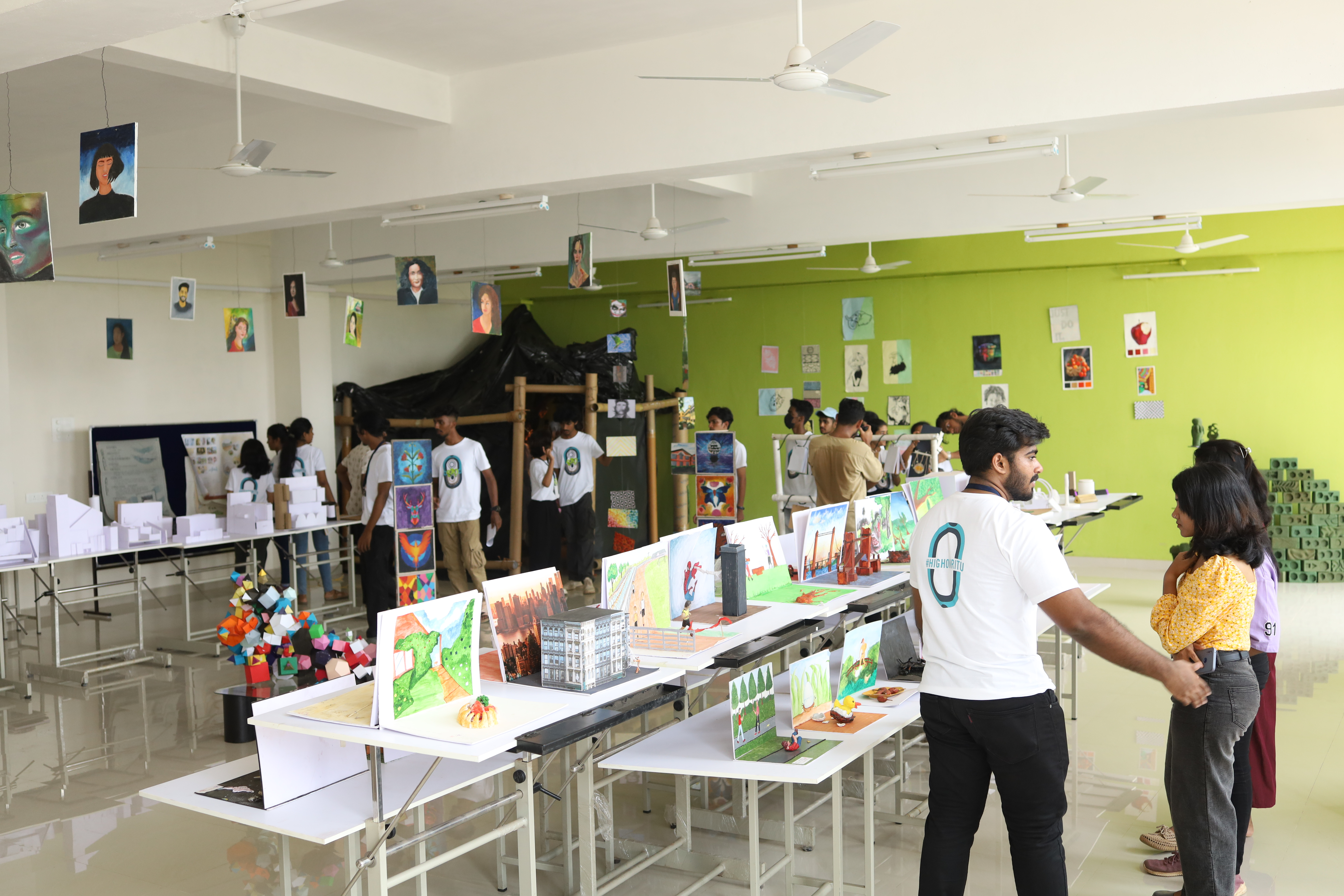
Architecture b arch of Rajiv Gandhi Institute of Technology (RIT) Kottayam campus in Kerala, 2025

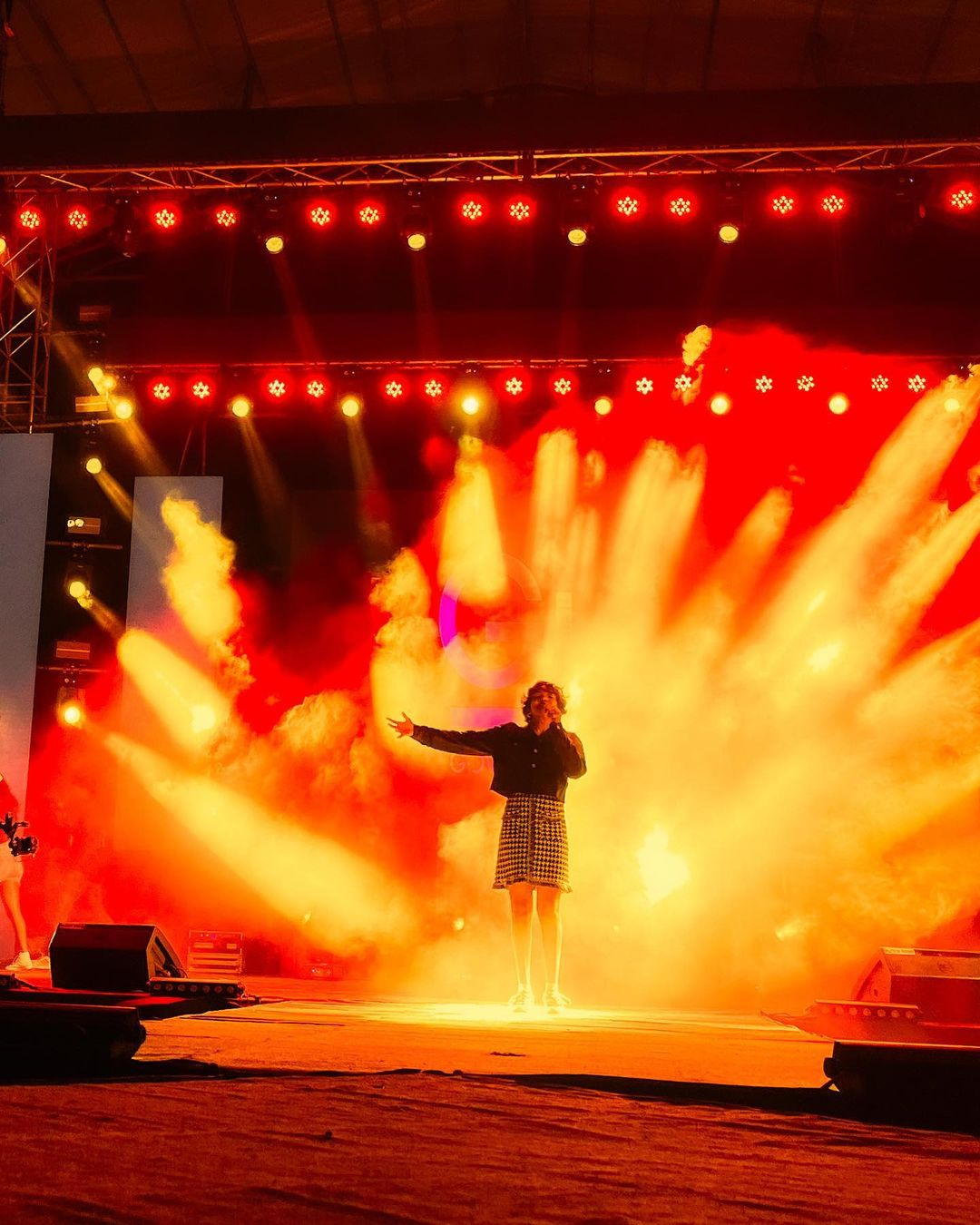
RITU 2023 Day1

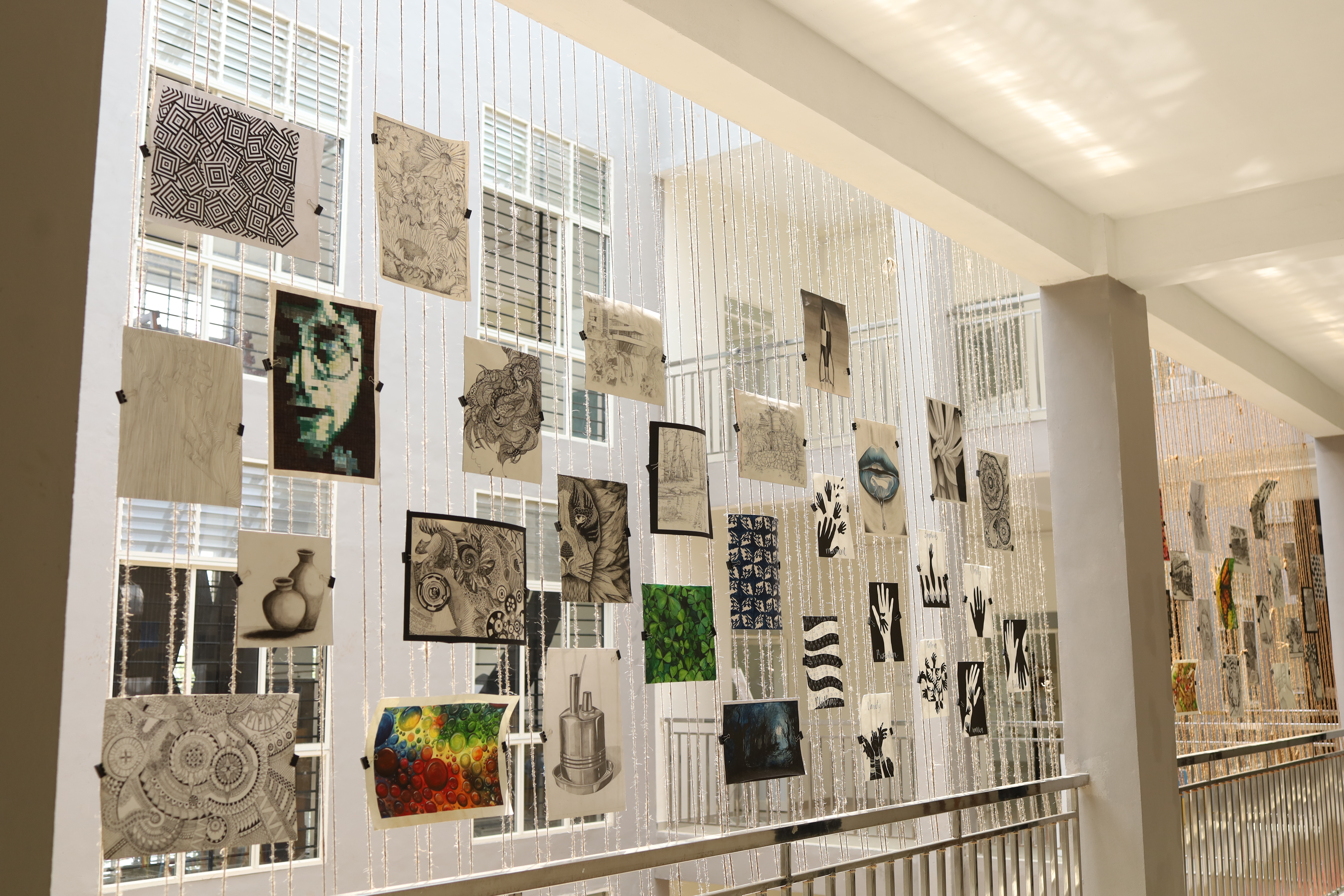
Architecture b arch of Rajiv Gandhi Institute of Technology (RIT) Kottayam campus in Kerala, 2025

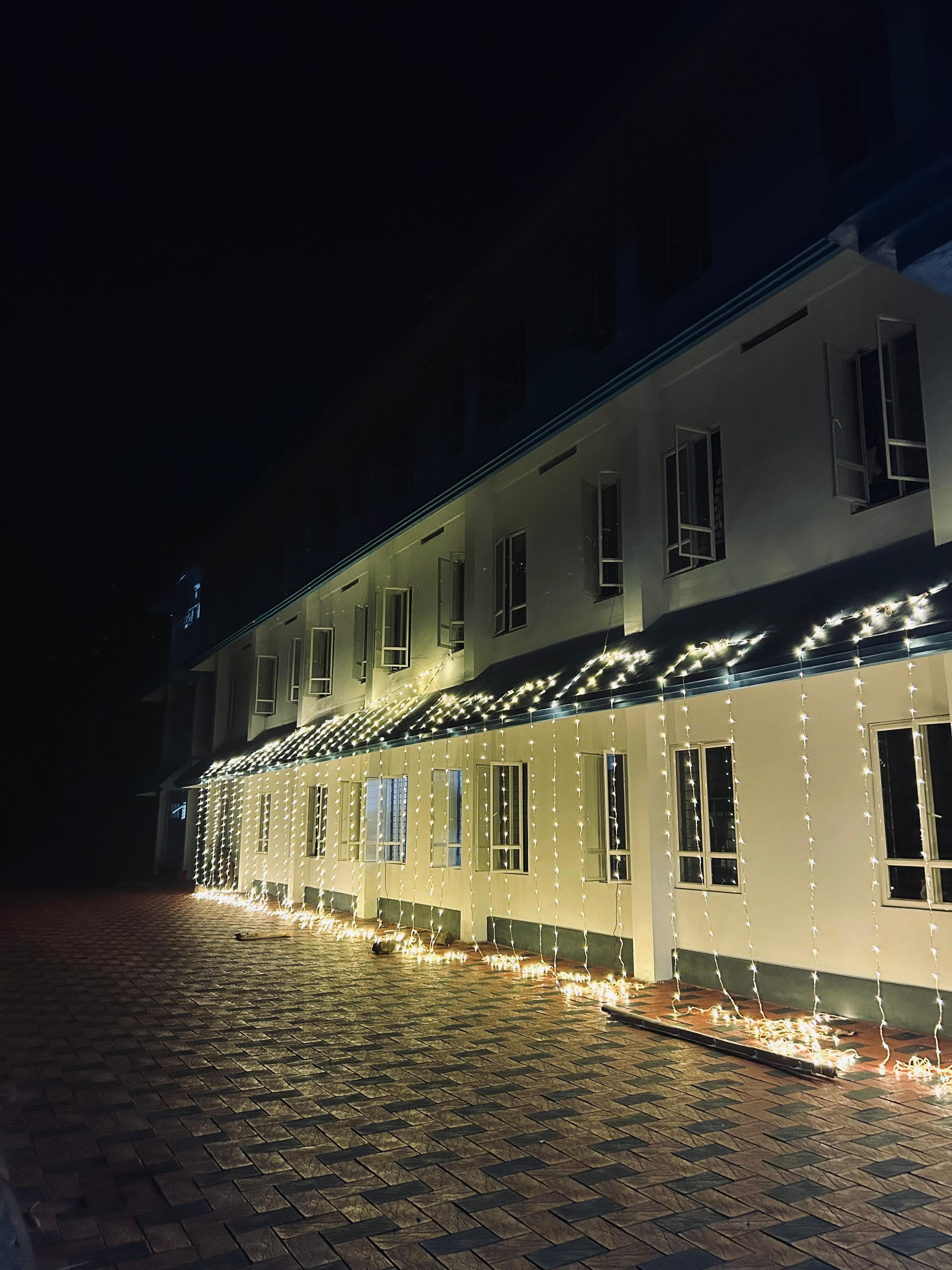
RIT Kottayam MENS HOSTEL

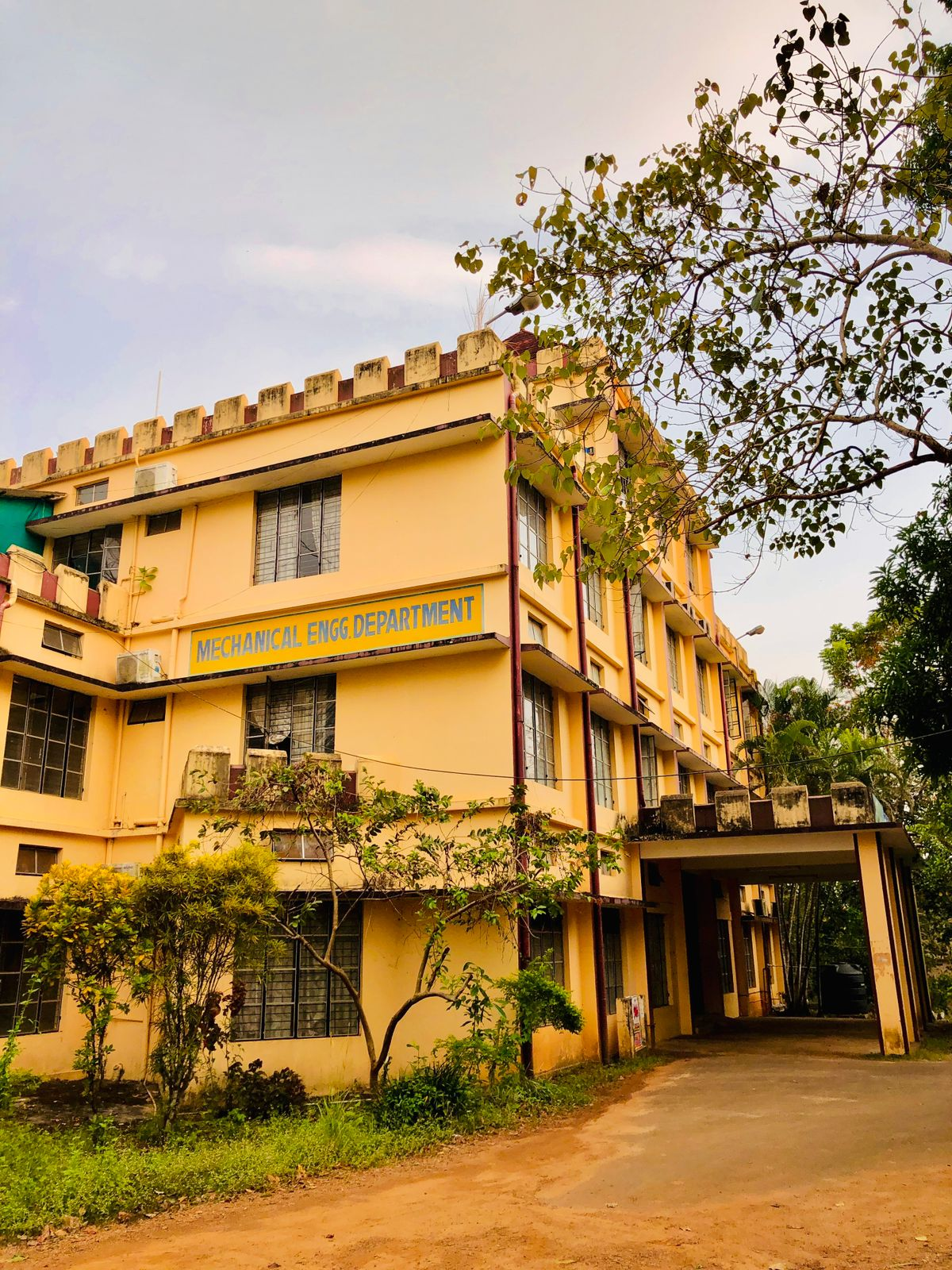
Mechanical Dept

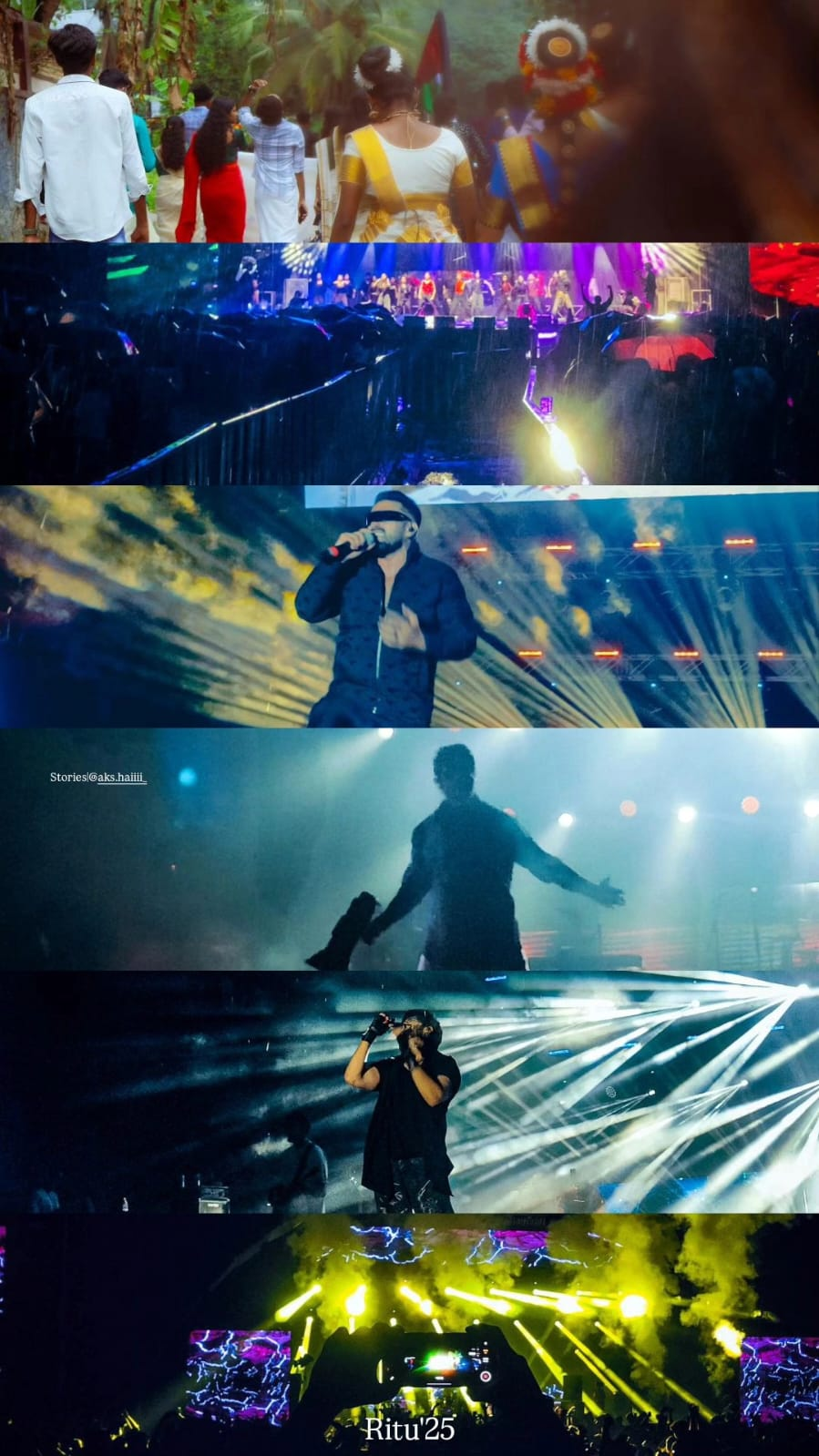
RITU 25 Glimpses RIT Kottayam

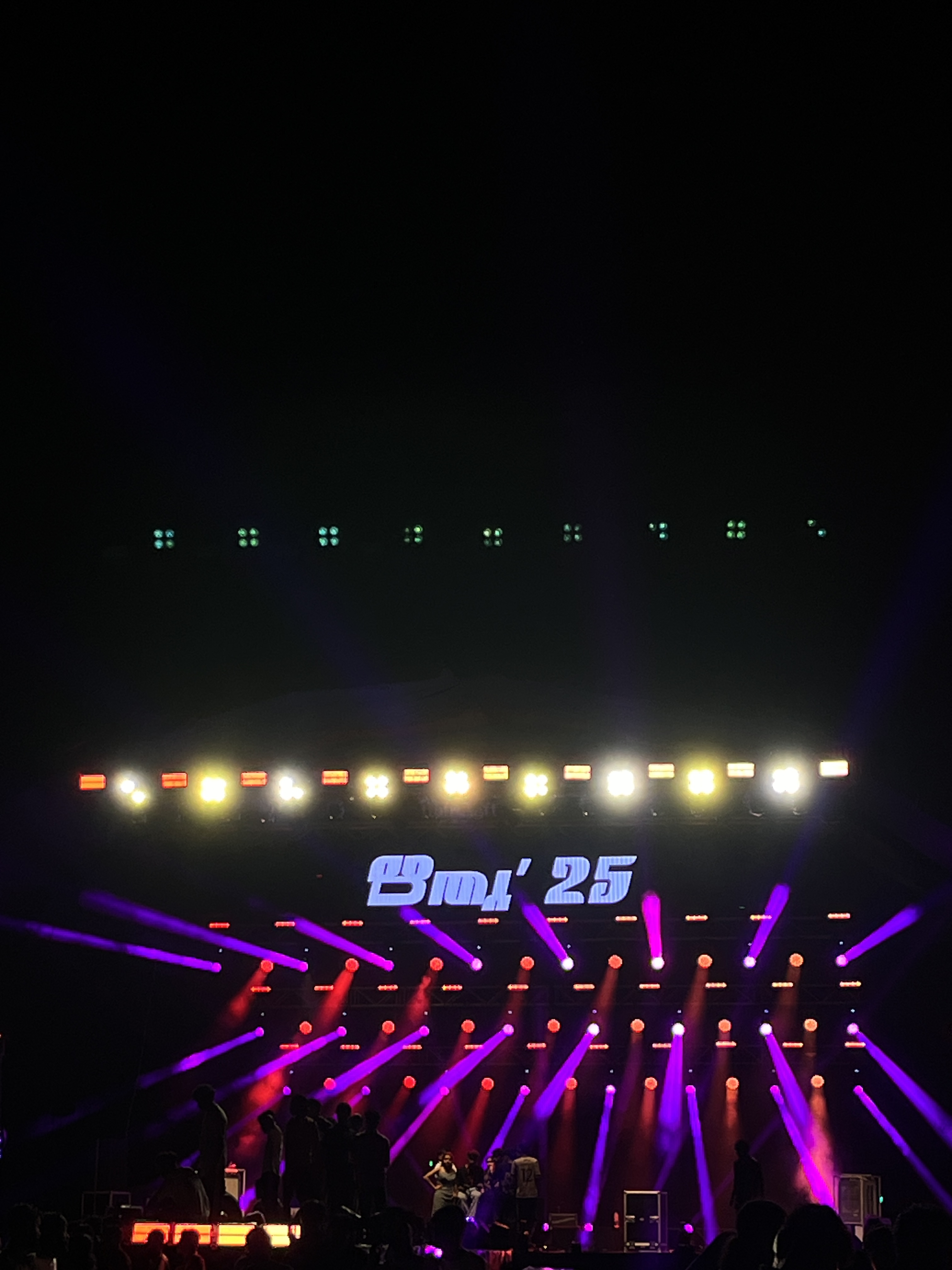
RITU 25 Glimpses RIT Kottayam
