= Kaba Gandhi No Delo =

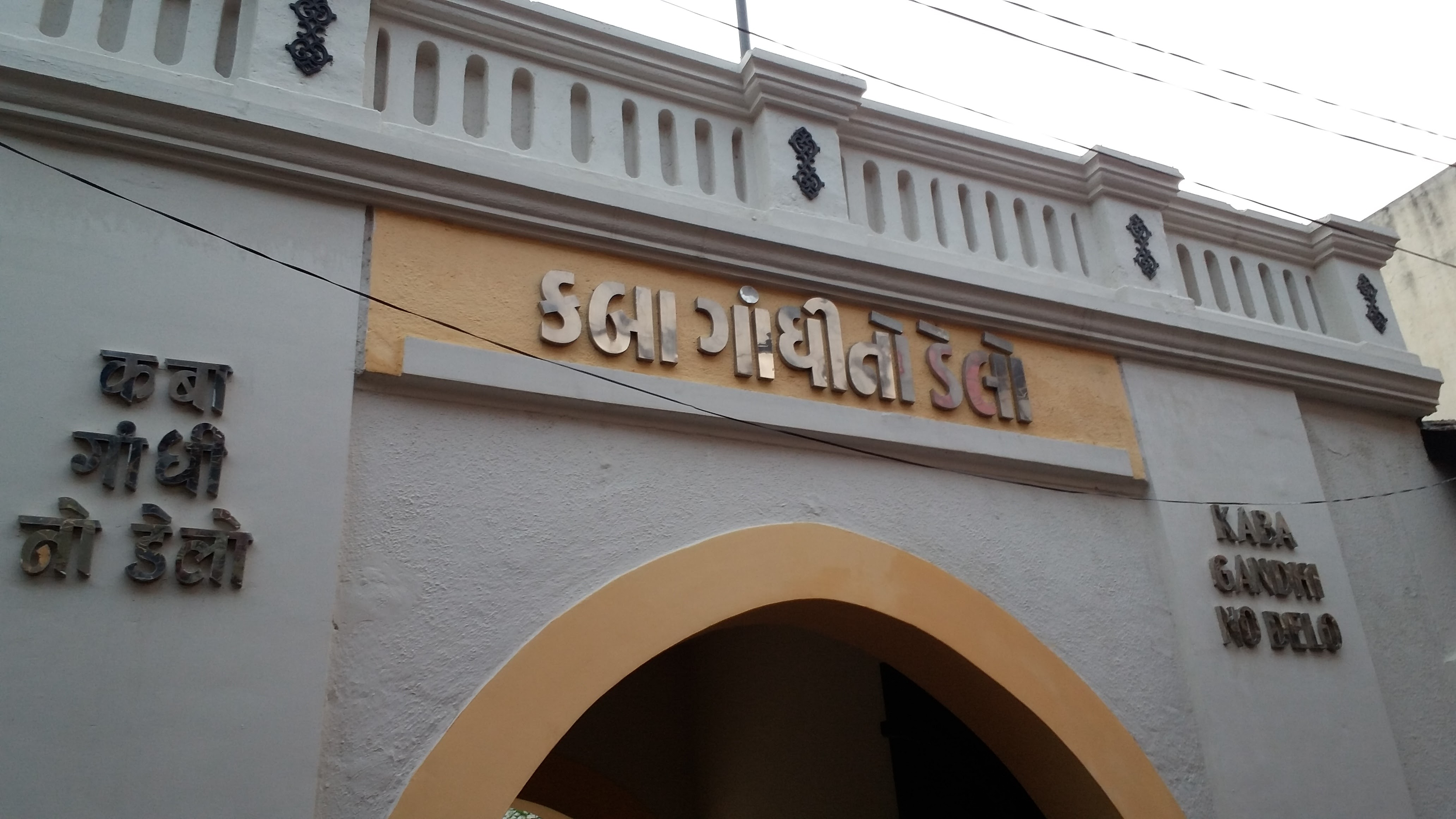
- Entrance
- Location: Rajkot, Gujarat, India
- Coordinates: 22°17′49″N 70°48′18″E
- Type: Museum
- Collections: Photographs, objects, belongings of Mahatma Gandhi
- Owner: Gandhi Smriti Trust
- Building details
- Alternative names: Gandhi Smriti

General information
- Type: Haveli
- Architectural style: Saurashtrian architecture
- Year built: 1880-1881

Technical details
- Floor count: 2
- Floor area: 400 square yards (330 m^{2})

Kaba Gandhi No Delo (lit. 'Kaba Gandhi's residence') is a house and a museum in Rajkot, Gujarat, India. It was Indian independence leader Mahatma Gandhi's primary family home from 1881 to 1915. It is built in the traditional Saurashtrian architectural style and houses a permanent pictorial exhibition called Gandhi Smriti.

== History ==
Mahatma Gandhi's father Karamchand Gandhi was popularly known as Kaba Gandhi and thus his home was known as Kaba Gandhi No Delo in Gujarati language, meaning 'Kaba Gandhi's residence'. Kaba Gandhi was a native of Porbandar and moved to Rajkot in 1874 when he was appointed Diwan (prime minister) of the Rajkot State. The family moved Rajkot two years later. The Rajkot State gave him 400 square yards (330 m^{2}) of land in early 1880 where he constructed the house and the family moved in new house in 1881 from a rented house. Mahatma Gandhi was 12 years old when they moved here. He married Kasturba and had the birth of their elder sons, Harilal and Manilal, during his stay in the house from 1881 to 1887. Kaba Gandhi died in 1885. It was a primary family home until 1915, including during those years when Gandhi stayed in London and in South Africa. Later on, on return from South Africa in 1915, he established Kochrab Ashram in Ahmedabad.

The Gandhi family sold the house in 1920. After independence of India, the Government of Saurashtra State bought it in 1948 from the owner then. It was handed over to the Gandhi Smriti Trust in 1969 on the birth centenary of Gandhi. Putliba Udyogmandir Trust, an NGO, conducted educational and sewing classes for few years from here before moving elsewhere. It houses a permanent exhibition now, called Gandhi Smriti.

== Architecture and features ==
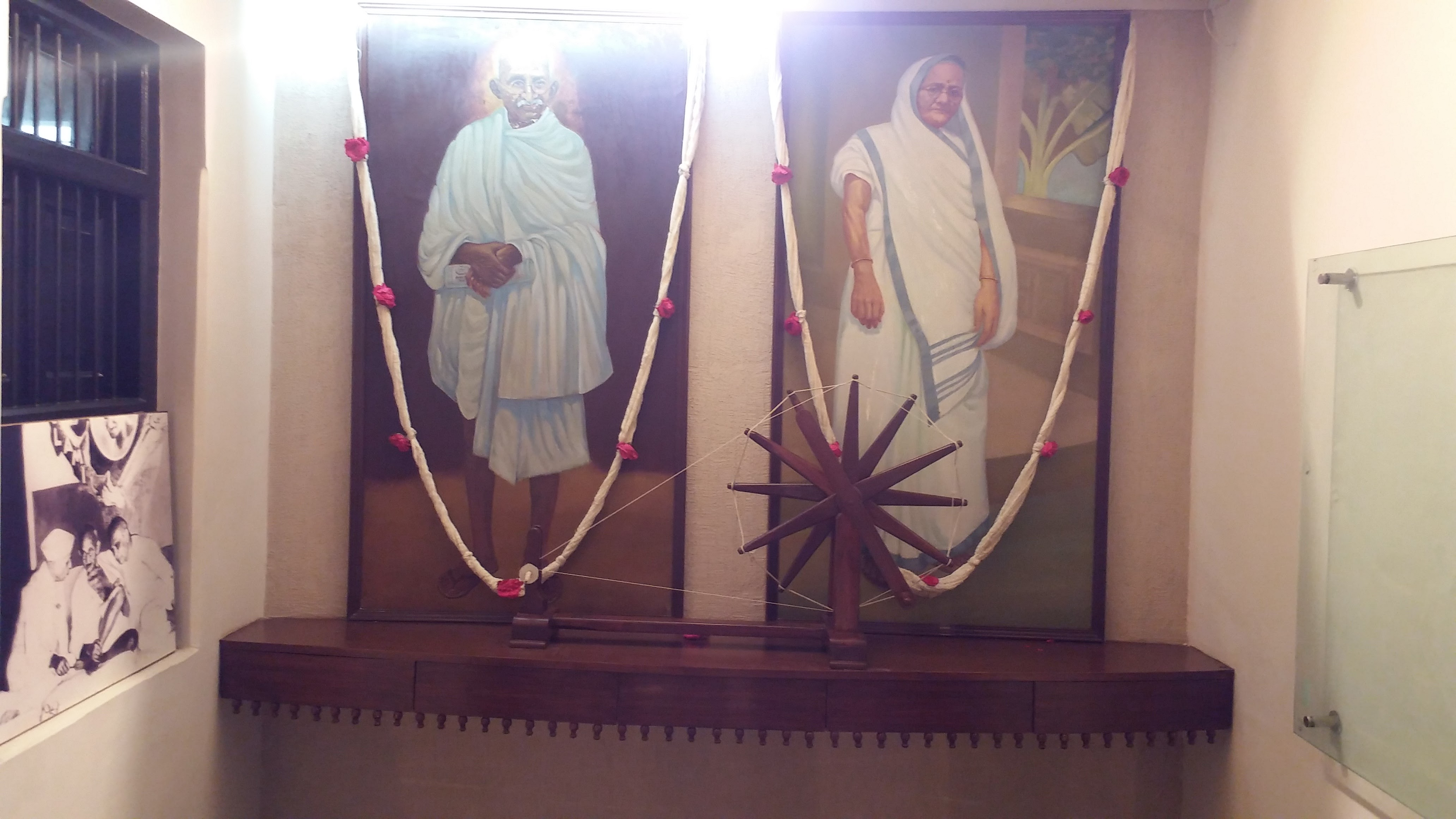
Paintings in the house

The haveli is built in the traditional Saurashtrian (Kathiawari) architectural style featuring an arched gateway leading to the courtyard surrounded by rooms. The house is marked 8, Kadiya Navline. It is located on Lakhajiraj Road and off Gheekanta Road.

The building has two floors. It is painted in white and yellow. It has a large gate compared to other gates and small shops in a neighbourhood. The house has nine rooms and a kitchen adjacent to the courtyard. There is a permanent pictorial exhibition in the house now which displays photographs, paintings, objects and the belongings of and related to Mahatma Gandhi. There is a hand pump in the courtyard.

== See also ==
- Kochrab Ashram
- Tolstoy Farm
- Sabarmati Ashram
- Sevagram
