= Kochrab Ashram =

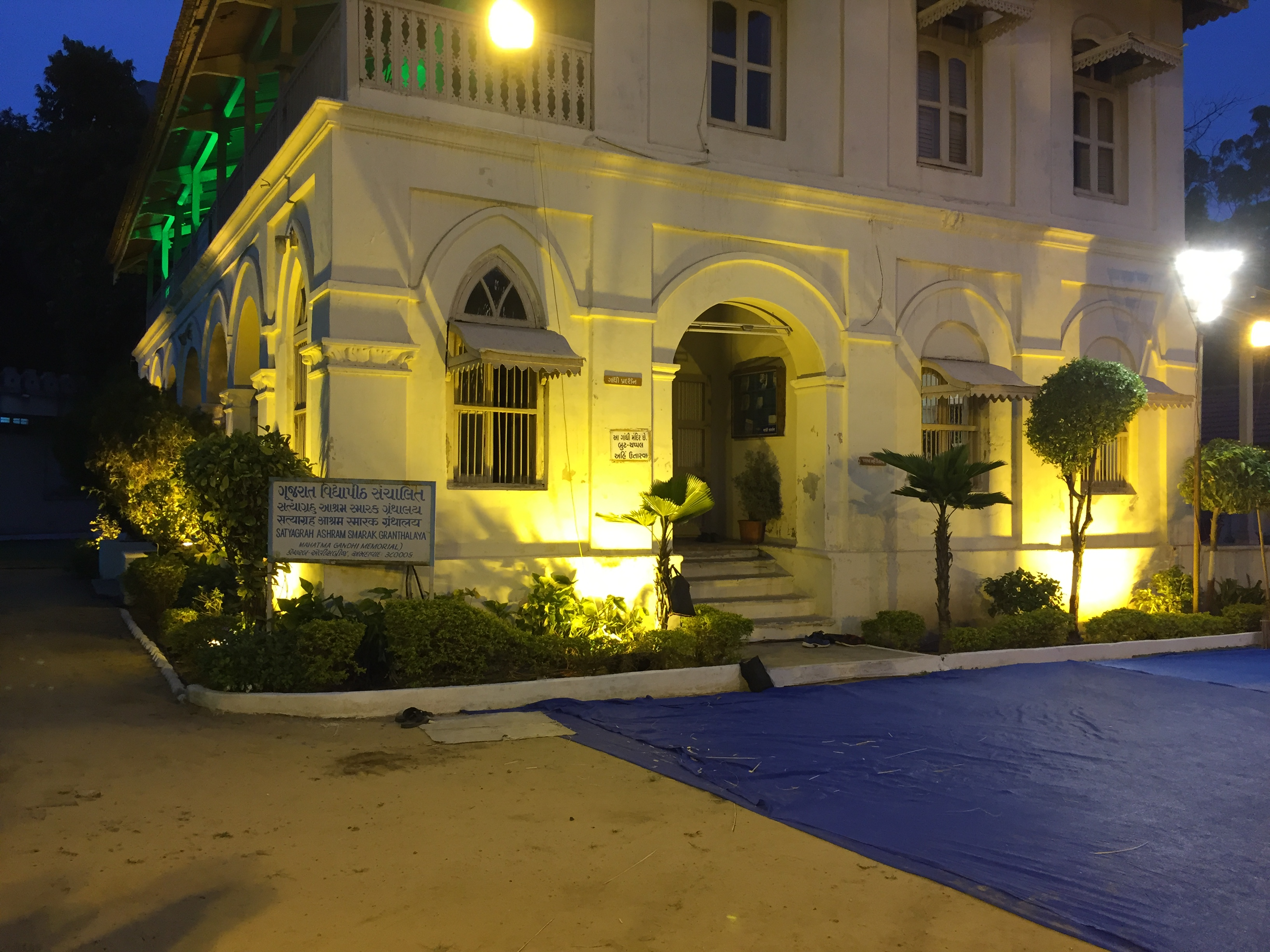
- Kochrab Ashram at night
- Established: 1915 (ashram), 1953 (museum)
- Location: Ahmedabad, Gujarat, India
- Coordinates: 23°00′57″N 72°34′00″E
- Type: museum
- Collections: Photographs, objects, belongings of Mahatma Gandhi
- Visitors: 19,500 (2015)
- Owner: Government of Gujarat
- Public transit access: AMTS
- Parking: Yes
- Building details
- Alternative names: Satyagraha Ashram

General information
- Type: House
- Architectural style: European architecture
- Year built: 19th century
- Renovated: 2024

Technical details
- Floor count: 2
- Floor area: 5,000 square metres (54,000 sq ft)

Kochrab Ashram, also known as Satyagraha Ashram, is a historic site and museum in Ahmedabad, Gujarat, India. The ashram was the founded in May 1915 by Mahatma Gandhi, leader of the Indian independence movement. For the next two years he lived in the ashram with several other members of the movement. Some of his Gandhian ideas were conceived during that time. In 1953 the Bombay State named the ashram a memorial and tendered it to the Gujarat Vidyapith a year later. Its renovation and redevelopment into a museum were completed in 2024.

The site includes a European style two-storey bungalow, a large garden, separate kitchen, and activity buildings.

== History ==
Gopal Krishna Gokhale had requested Mahatma Gandhi return to India from South Africa to organise a community for the Swaraj movement. When he did return In 1915, Gandhi planned to establish a shared living space to foster personal growth, self-reliance, and community service - an ashram. Many cities including Ahmedabad, Calcutta, Rajkot and Haridwar invited him to build his ashram in their communities. During a visit in January 1915, Hariprasad Desai and others persuaded Gandhi to choose Ahmedabad. According to Gandhi, as a Gujarati, he could better serve using his native language. A large textile industry and history of loom weaving would also help to revive the cottage industry of hand spinning. He also hoped for financial support from Ahmedabad's wealthy citizens. On 11 May 1915, Gandhi gave a list of items required for the ashram to mill owner Mangaldas Girdhardas, and estimated an annual expenditure of ₹6000.

In Ahmedabad, Gandhi resided with his friend, barrister Jivanlal Desai, with whom he had studied in London. Desai offered his "vacation-home", a bunglow in Kochrab village, then on the outskirts of Ahmedabad, for an annual rent of ₹1 while Gandhi was founding the ashram. Gandhi named it the "Satyagraha Ashram" to highlight satyagraha, the approach of nonviolent resistance he had successfully employed in South Africa, and his intention to bring it to India. The ashram is commonly called Kochrab Ashram to avoid confusion with Sabarmati Ashram. Other suggested names included Tapovan and Sevashram.

On 20 May 1915, Gandhi and his compatriots formally took over the bungalow and performed vastu puja. They moved in on 22 May 1915, and formally established the ashram on 25 May 1915. Initially it housed about 25 men and women, including 13 Tamils who had returned from South Africa. Maganlal Gandhi was an initial member. Mahatma Gandhi created rules and observances for members of the ashram. Several Gandhian ideas, including the use of khadi and self-reliance, were implemented during his stay. He urged members to practice celibacy, engage in physical labour and wear swadeshi clothes. The membership increased to about 100, including Vinoba Bhave and Kaka Kalelkar.

Gandhi's admitting of a Dalit family in September 1915 caused a controversy among the members and the cessation of donations. Gandhi stood firm in his decision and was anonymously helped by Ambalal Sarabhai who donated ₹13,000, saving the ashram from closing. During an outbreak of plague, Gandhi noted the risk to the ashram's children and had them moved to a new ashram a safe distance from the city. Gandhi and other members moved to the new Sabarmati Ashram on 17 June 1917.

On 4 October 1953, then Chief Minister of Bombay State Morarji Desai declared the ashram a memorial. In 1954, the management was transferred to Gujarat Vidyapith where Desai was chancellor. The ashram is still owned by the state. The 2001 Gujarat earthquake damaged the structure which was repaired with government funds. The damaged Kota stone floor in Gandhi's room was replaced with new polished stone. Later, the ashram lost about 15-30 feet of land from its front side for expansion of the Ashram Road in exchange for the land granted at the back.

Architect Snehal Shah and Poonam Trambadia managed a renovation and redevelopment from 2019 to 2024. The redeveloped ashram was inaugurated by Prime Minister Narendra Modi on 12 March 2024, the 94th anniversary of the Dandi March.

== Architecture and features ==
The ashram spreads over 5,000 square metres (54,000 sq ft) and has a European-style bungalow with a large garden. The two-storey structure, with a dozen rooms and a tile roof, has thick walls covered with limestone; the wooden ceiling is supported by wooden pillars. Gandhi, Kasturba, and other members used the ground floor rooms. There are bathrooms and a storeroom, surrounded by a veranda. The first floor features a low-seating conference room, a library and a large balcony where a brass bell was used to alert the members of the ashram of scheduled activities. The top floor is wooden and is reached by a wooden staircase.

A writing desk, charkha, photographs and documents associated with Mahatma Gandhi are displayed. A series of wall panels featuring quotes from his autobiography, The Story of My Experiments with Truth, narrate the history of the compound. There are also large portraits of Gandhi, Kasturba and some Gandhi influences, Leo Tolstoy, Shrimad Rajchandra and John Ruskin.

The kitchen is located in the building's rear and consists of a single floor with a tiled roof, a storeroom, toilets and bathrooms. Panch Ordio, “five rooms,” is an elongated building which was utilized for a variety of activities, including weaving and carpentry.

The modern Activities Centre was built in 2024 and has around 10 rooms (four air-conditioned) on the top floor. The rooms are named after various past members of the ashram. There is a book and souvenir shop for visitors. In 2015, 19,500 people toured the ashram.

== See also ==
- Kaba Gandhi No Delo
- Tolstoy Farm
- Sevagram
