= J.B. Petit =

Jehangir Bomanji Petit (21 August 1879 ― 1946) was a noted nationalist, mill owner, philanthropist, and one of Mahatma Gandhi's earliest supporters.

Belonging to the Petit family, Jehangir was the grandson of Sir Dinshaw Maneckjee Petit and the eldest son of the Bomanjee Dinshaw Petit. He was also the cousin of Mithuben Petit and Rattanbai Petit. He inherited ownership of Petit Mills and additionally served as the Chairman of the Bombay Mill Owners Association.

J. B. Petit was amongst the first supporters of Mahatma Gandhi. When Gandhi reached India and Bombay for the first time on 9 January 1915, Petit along with other Indian nationalists like Narottam Morarji, Bhalchandra Krishna, B. G. Horniman, Revashanker Zaveri, Maganlal Gandhi took a launch to reach the steamer to welcome Kasturba and Mohandas Gandhi at Apollo bunder, where a large crowd had gathered to welcome Gandhi. Later on 12 January 1915, J. B. Petit organised a reception at his bungalow, Mount Petit on Pedder Road. There were over 600 distinguished citizens, with both Europeans and Indians present. Prominent among them were Muhammad Ali Jinnah, Seth Bomanjee Dinshaw Petit, Kaikobad Dinshaw, C. H. Setalvad, B. G. Horniman, Gokuldas Kahnadas Parekh, Gopal Krishna Gokhale, Sir Jamshetjee Jeejebhoy, Sir Cowasjee Jehangir, Sir Narayan Chandavarkar, Sir Currimbhoy Ibrahim, Fazulbhoy Currimbhoy, Bhalechandra Krishna, Manmohandas Ramjee, Hazee Esmail, Dinsha Vaccha, Richard Amphlett Lamb, K. M. Munshi, Pherozeshah Mehta, Sir Dorab Tata, C. Dinshaw Adenwallah, Hormusji Wadia, Narayan Madhav Samarth and Sir Claude Hill.

He financially supported the nationalist movement and was amongst the first benefactors of Gandhi in India. He was in contact with Gandhi before his arrival in India, and had supported Gandhi's struggle in Transvaal in South Africa and activities of Servants of India Society. He attended the 1922 trial of Mohandas Gandhi.

J.B. Petit High School for Girls in Mumbai was named after him for his financial support and efforts to allow all castes to attend the school. Jehangir Bomanji Petit also convinced his father, Seth Bomanji D. Petit, to donate the Cumbala Hotel in Cumbala, which led to the foundation of the Bomanjee Dinshaw Petit Parsee General Hospital in 1907. He was the Secretary of the South African Indian Fund and Joint Secretary of the South African Indian Passive Resistance Fund. He was associated with Friends of India. He was a member of the 1927 Bombay Legislative Council as a representative of the Bombay Mill Owners Association. He also helped in promoting the Free Press of India. J. B. Petit also assisted Sir Pherozeshah Mehta in launching the Indian Daily Mail, which he later went on to control. His 1943 book "The superiority and colour complex" was considered for proscription or prosecution, for its potential to stir up trouble between classes, but ultimately the Indian government decided to ignore it.

J.B Petit was married to the social activist, Jaiji Jehangir Petit. He died in 1946.
