= Gandhi Smarak Sangrahalaya =

Museum in India

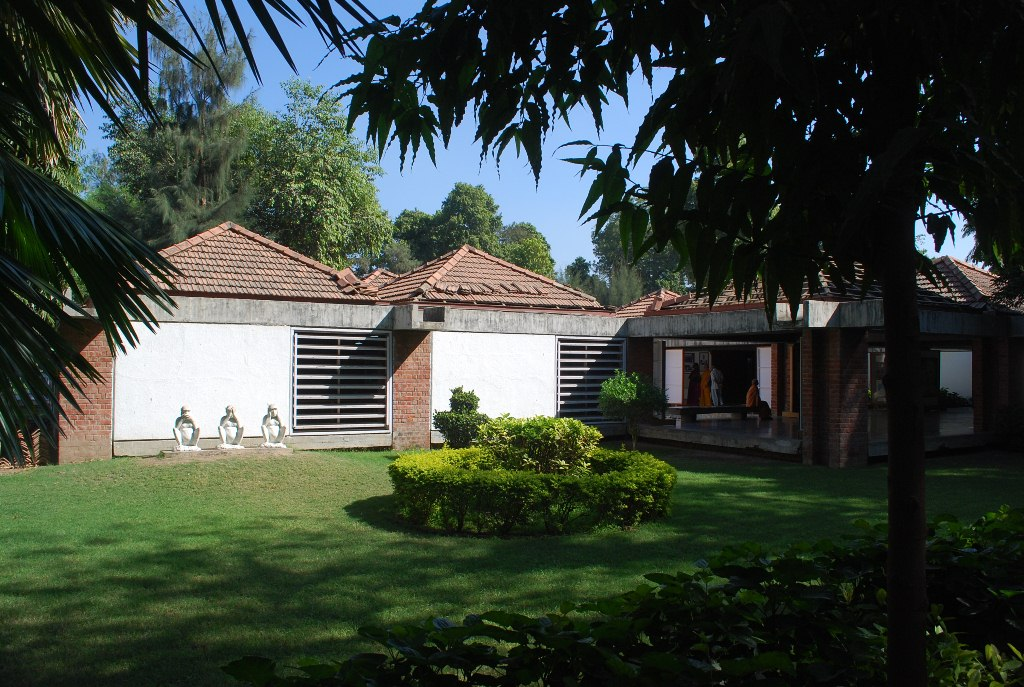
Some of Gandhi Smarak Sangrahalaya's modular buildings.

The Gandhi Smarak Sangrahalaya (Gandhi Memorial Institution) is a museum and public service institution dedicated to preserve the work and memory and commemorate the life of Indian leader Mahatma Gandhi. It is located at Gandhi's Sabarmati Ashram in Ahmedabad, India on the banks of River Sabarmati. It houses tens of thousands of letters to and by Gandhi, as well as photographs and books.

It was designed by the renowned architect Charles Correa beginning in 1958. The museum, Correa's first important commission, consisted originally of 51 modular units, each 6 x 6 metres, surrounding a water court. The complex was inaugurated by Jawaharlal Nehru in 1963.
