= J.B. Petit High School for Girls =

Private school in Mumbai, India

Coordinates: 18.93466°N 72.83182°E

Information
- Former name: Miss Prescott's Fort Christian School
- Funding type: Private school
- Motto: Ever Forward
- Established: 1865; 161 years ago
- Gender: Girls
- Enrollment: 1000 (approx.)
- Website: www.jbpetithighschool.com

The J. B. Petit High School for Girls is a private all-girls school in the Fort neighbourhood of Mumbai, Maharashtra, India established in 1865. The school currently offers the ICSE board. The school is named after Jehangir Bomanji Petit.

== History ==
The school was originally established as 'Miss Prescott's Fort Christian School' by an English woman in 1865, thanks to donations from city philanthropists like the distinguished Premchand Roychand. It was later renamed the 'Frere Fletcher School'. In 1965, the school was sought to be merged with the Cathedral Girls School when Mr. Jehangir Bomanji Petit took over the schools administration. Although established and run by members of the Zoroastrian community, Mr. Petit wanted to ensure that the school maintained its cosmopolitan and diverse character. The 'J. B. Petit High School for Girls' as it came to be called after its savior, still maintains this cosmopolitan nature today. In 1973, the school came under the leadership of principal Shirin Darasha who brought to the school a zeal for drama and the arts that is still prevalent today as well as progressive ideas and methods of education.

== Notable alumni ==
The famous cine actress and singer Suraiya attended the school in the 1940s, from where she used to go for her singing and acting roles in films while still a child. The first Indian woman lawyer at the Bombay High Court, as well as the first Indian woman barrister, Mithan Jamshed Lam was also an alumna of the school. Bollywood actress of 60s & 70s Asha Parekh was also an alumna of the school. Indian revolutionary leader and writer Anuradha Gandhy also attended the school. Other alumnae include RJ Erica D'Souza, Actor Faezeh Jalali, Author Gopika Kapoor, flutist Dilshad Posnock, Illustrator Tara Anand and Journalist and Author Madhumita Murgia.

== See also ==
- List of educational institutions in Mumbai
