= Sevagram =

Village in Maharashtra

- town
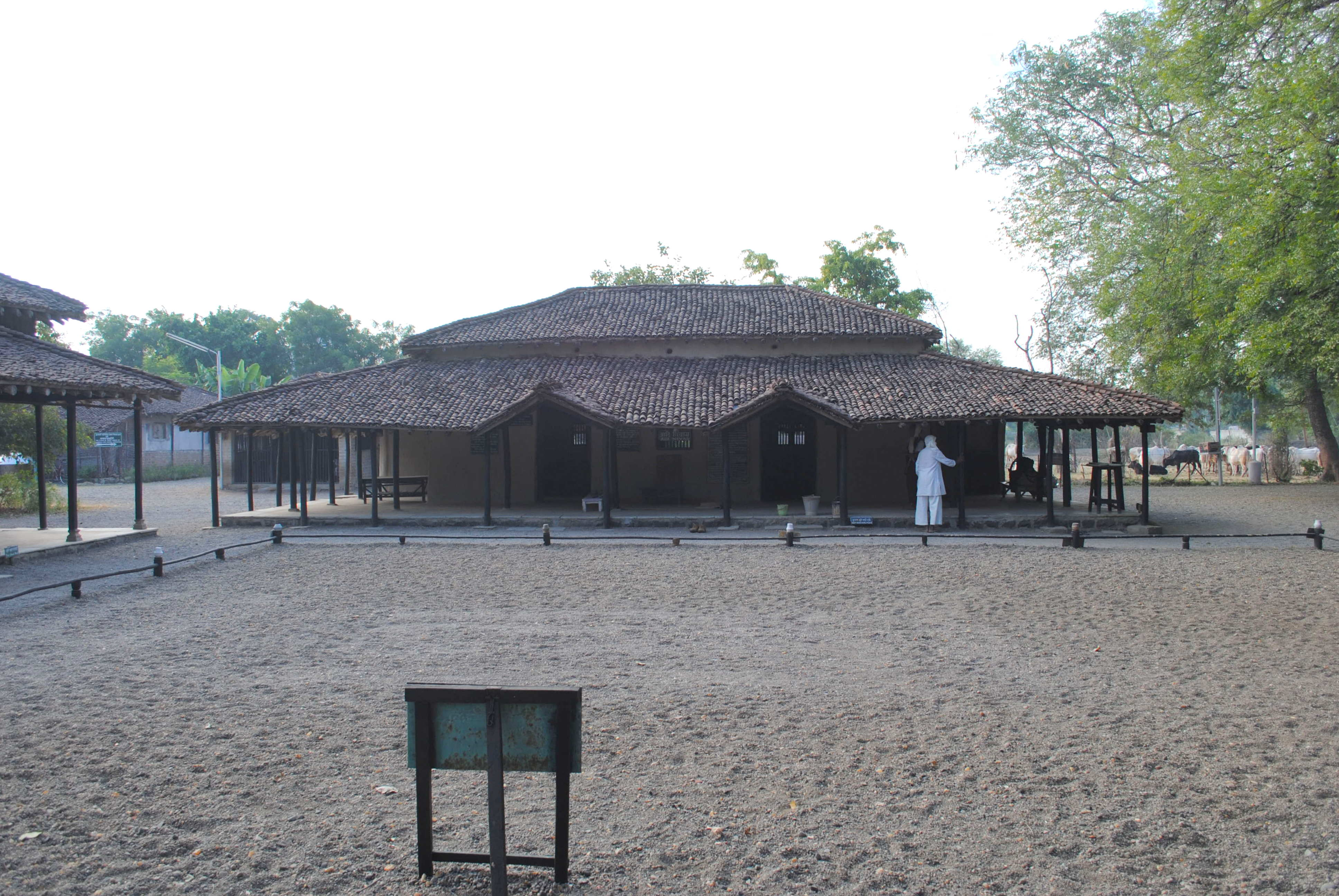
- Adi Nivas, the first residence of Mahatma Gandhi in Sevagram Ashram.

- Location within Maharashtra Location within India
- Coordinates: 20°44′10″N 78°39′45″E
- Country: India
- State: Maharashtra
- District: Wardha

Population (2011)
  - Total: 8,000

Languages
  - Official: Marathi
- Time zone: UTC+5:30 (IST)
- PIN: 442 102
- Telephone code: 91 7152
- Vehicle registration: MH - 32
- Nearest city: Wardha
- Lok Sabha constituency: Wardha
- Vidhan Sabha constituency: Wardha
- Website: maharashtra.gov.in

Sevagram (meaning "A town for/of service") is a town in the state of Maharashtra, India. It was the place of Mahatma Gandhi's ashram and his residence from 1936 to his death in 1948. After Sabarmati, Sevagram Ashram holds immense importance due to the residence of Mahatma Gandhi.

== Overview ==
Sevagram, originally Segaon, is a small village, located about 8 km from Wardha. Gandhi set up what eventually became an ashram in the outskirts of the village. Seth Jamnalal Bajaj of Wardha, a disciple of Gandhi, made available to the ashram about 300 acres (1.2 km^{2}) of land. Near the ashram there is a museum where artifacts of India's freedom struggle are preserved.

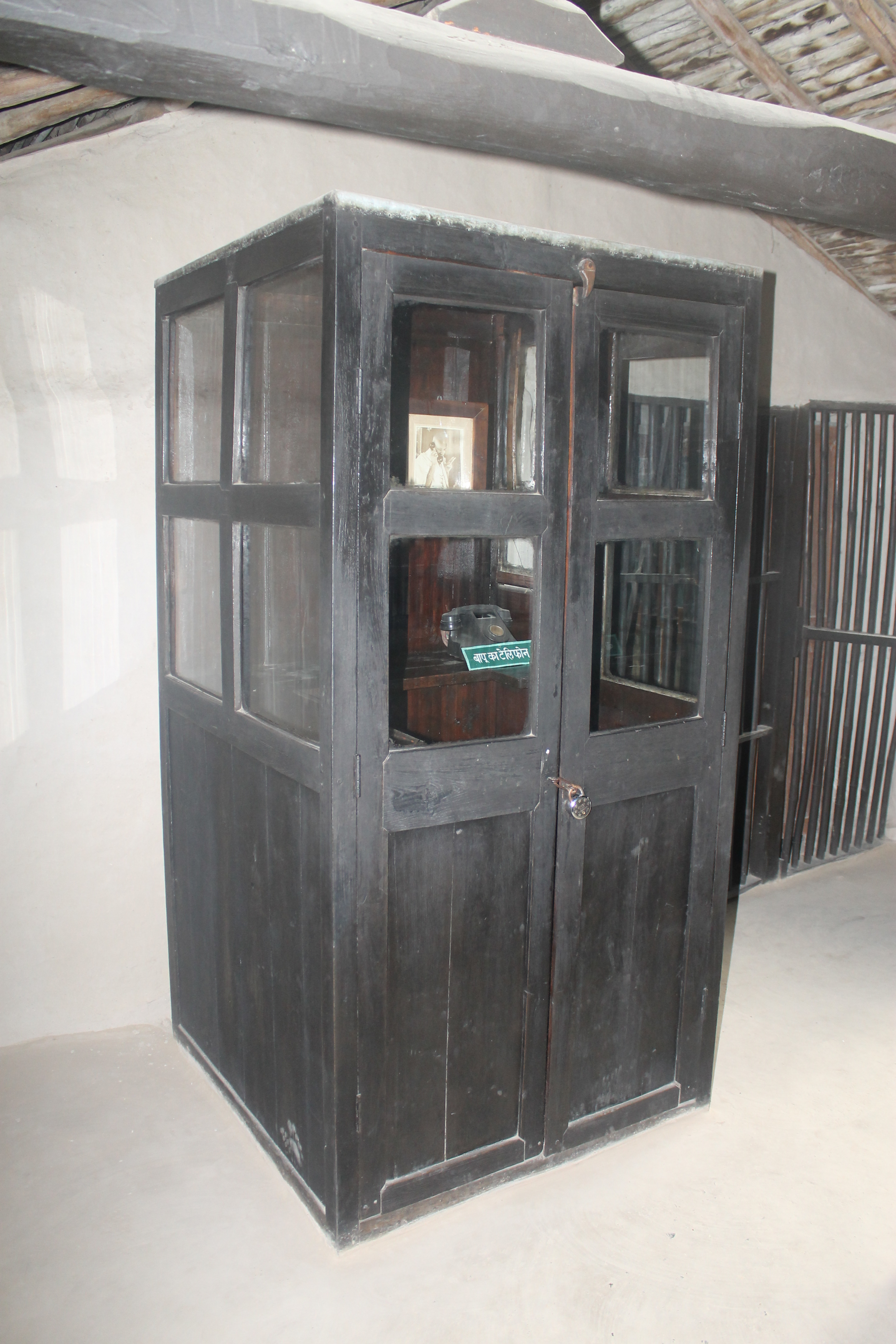
Telephone used by Gandhi, Sevagram ashram

== History ==
When Gandhi started his padayatra in 1930 from Sabarmati Ashram to Dandi for the Salt Satyagraha, he decided not to return to Sabarmati till India achieved independence. Gandhi was imprisoned for more than two years. On his release, he spent some time travelling around India. He decided to make a village in Central India his headquarters. He came to Wardha on 5 August 1934, at the invitation of his follower and industrialist, Jamnalal Bajaj, and stayed in one of the rooms at Jamnalal's bungalow (Bajajwadi) at Wardha, and in the Prarthana mandir of Mahila Ashram for some time.

In April 1936, Gandhiji established his residence in a village called Segaon, at the outskirts of Wardha, which he renamed as Sevagram, which means 'village of service'. Gandhiji was 67 years old when he came to Sevagram. The small homes, which were built in the ashram for Gandhi and his wife Kasturba, and his followers, were similar to the typical village homes. The ashram employed some Harijans in the common kitchen to break the caste barrier. Vinoba Bhave's Param Dham Ashram is located on the banks of the Dhaam river, close by. Many decisions on important national matters and movements were taken at Sevagram. It became the central place for a number of institutions for the nation-building activities devised by Gandhiji to suit the inherent strength of this country.

Sevagram is 8 km from Wardha town in Maharashtra and 75 km from Nagpur. In spite of many practical difficulties, Gandhiji decided to settle here. Though he did not have any intentions of keeping anybody with him except his wife Kasturba, pressure of work necessitated more colleagues with him till Sevagram Ashram became a full-fledged institution. There were no facilities at Sevagram, not even a post or telegraph office. The letters used to be brought from Wardha. There was another village in this region named Shegaon, made famous by the residence of Saint Gajanan Maharaj. So, Gandhiji's letters used to get misdirected. Therefore, it was decided in 1940 to rename this village as Sevagram or 'the village of service'. Gandhiji stayed in Manganwadi during January 1935 paid his first visit Sevagram on 30 April 1936. The British Government provided a telephone connection to Sevagram, so as to have regular communication with Gandhi.

== Transport ==
Sevagram is well connected by rail and bus. Sevagram railway station is 6 km from the main village. Previously the station was named as Wardha East railway station. Sevagram is a station on the Howrah-Nagpur-Mumbai line. Also most trains from the north towards south and east towards west pass through this route. Warud station is nearer but few trains stop there. The closest airport is situated around 55 km away in Nagpur. The British Viceroy, Lord Linlithgow (in office 1936–1943) had installed a hotline in Bapu Kuti. The reason given is that the British wanted to remain in constant touch with Gandhiji. Lord Linlithgow had once spent a night in Sevagram ashram with Gandhi.

== Education ==
Sevagram is the home to the first rural medical college in India, The Mahatma Gandhi Institute of Medical Sciences, and an engineering college, Bapurao Deshmukh College of Engineering, which is also run by a rural trust.

== See also ==
- Tolstoy Farm
- Kochrab Ashram
- Sabarmati Ashram
