= Sabarmati Ashram =

Residence of Mahatma Gandhi (1917–1930)

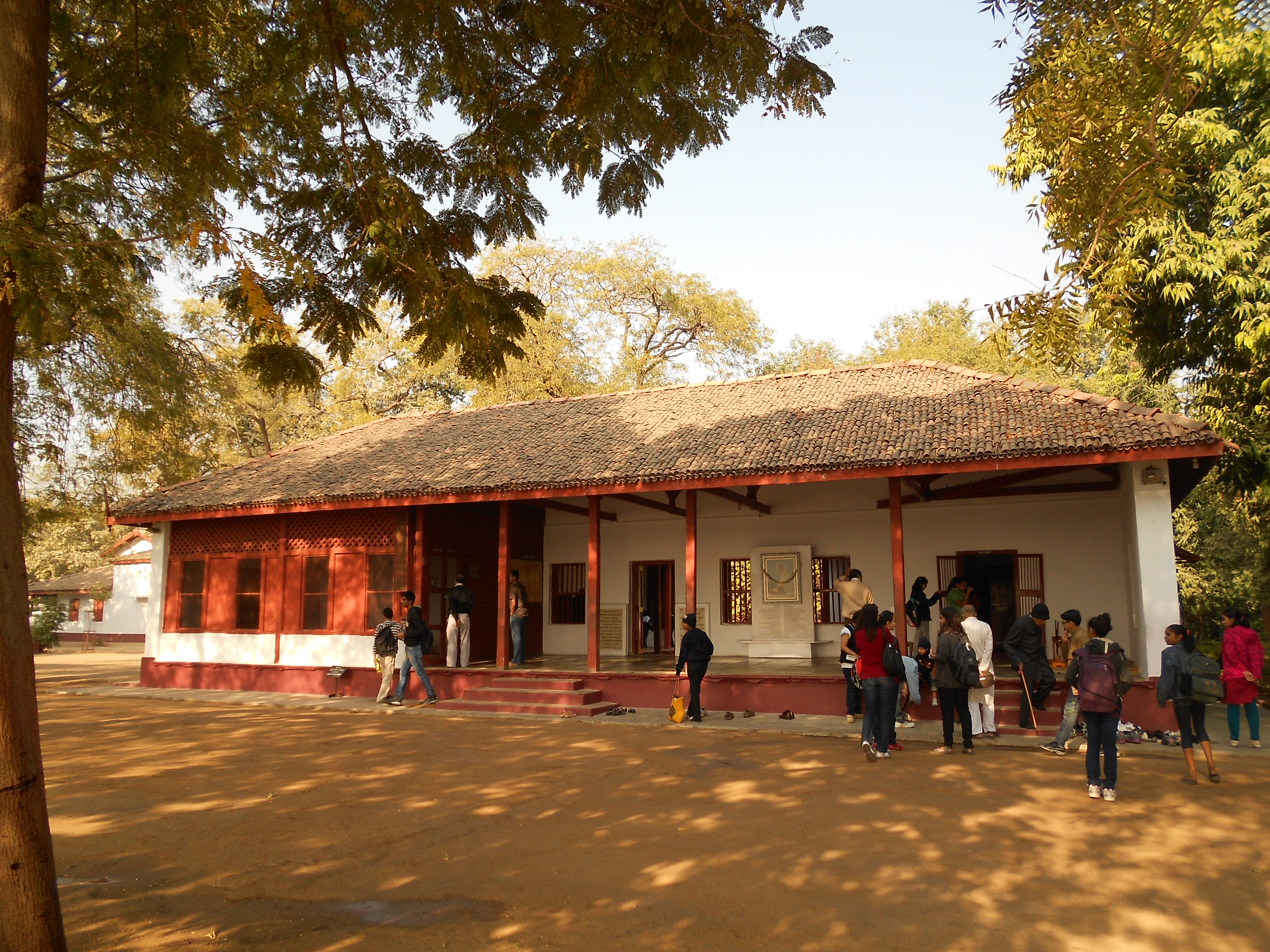
- Hridaya Kunj in Sabarmati Ashram

- Location in Gujarat Sabarmati Ashram (Gujarat)
- Former name: Gandhi Memorial Museum, Gandhi Smarak Sangralaya
- Established: 10 May 1963 (memorial museum)
- Location: Sabarmati, Ahmedabad, Gujarat, India
- Coordinates: 23°03′36″N 72°34′51″E
- Type: memorial
- Founder: Mahatma Gandhi
- Architect: Charles Correa (memorial museum)
- Website: www.gandhiashramsabarmati.org

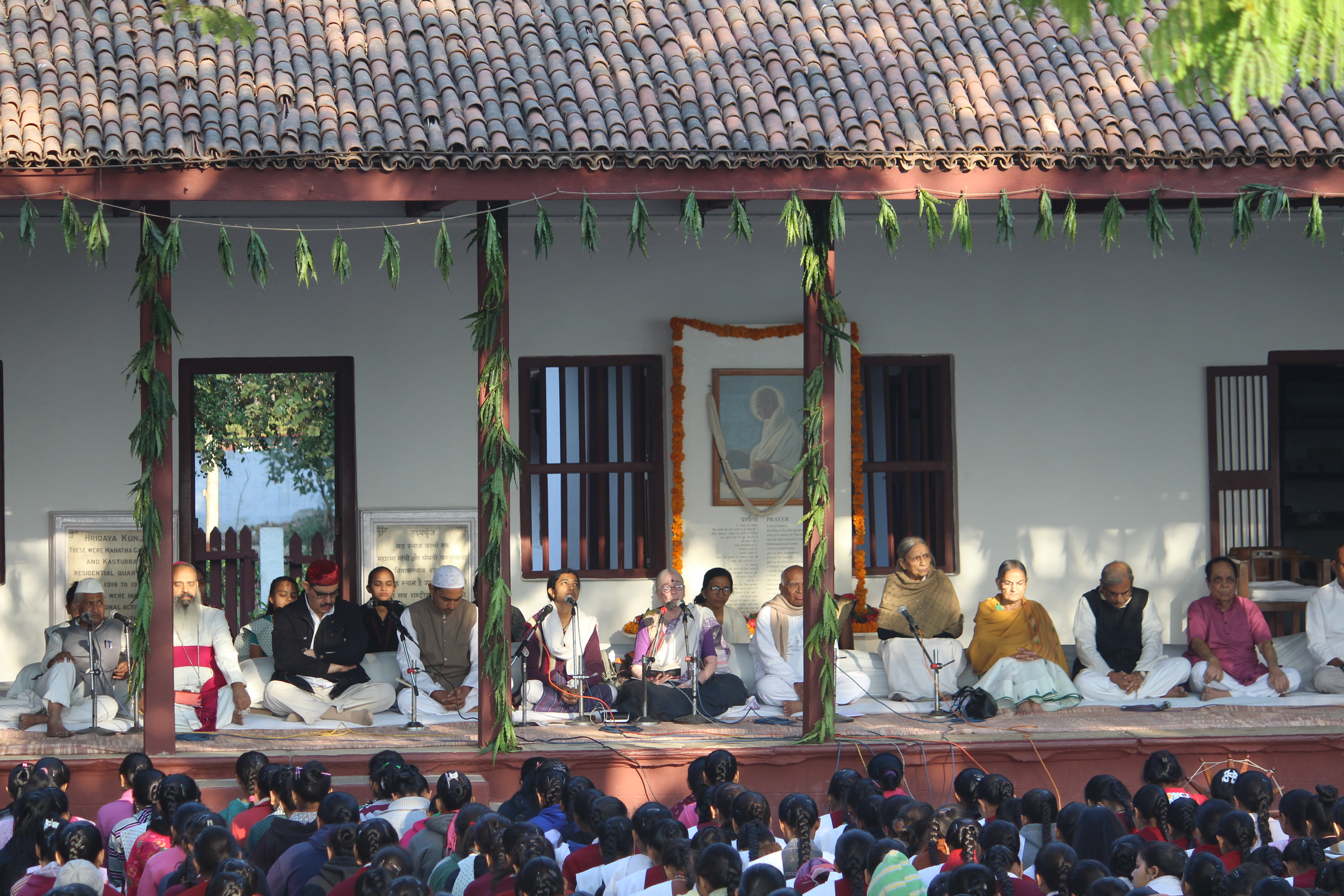
Prayer at Sabarmati Ashram on 30 January 2019

Sabarmati Ashram is located in the Sabarmati suburb of Ahmedabad, Gujarat, adjoining Ashram Road, on the banks of the Sabarmati River, 4 miles (6.4 km) from the town hall. This was one of the many residences of Mahatma Gandhi, who lived at Sabarmati (Gujarat) and Sevagram (Wardha, Maharashtra) when he was not travelling across India or in prison. He lived in Sabarmati or Wardha for a total of twelve years with his wife, Kasturba Gandhi and followers, including Vinoba Bhave. The Bhagavad Gita was recited here daily as part of the ashram schedule.

It was from here that Gandhi led the Dandi March, also known as the Salt Satyagraha, on 12 March 1930. The Indian government has established the Ashram as a national monument.

== History of Ashram ==
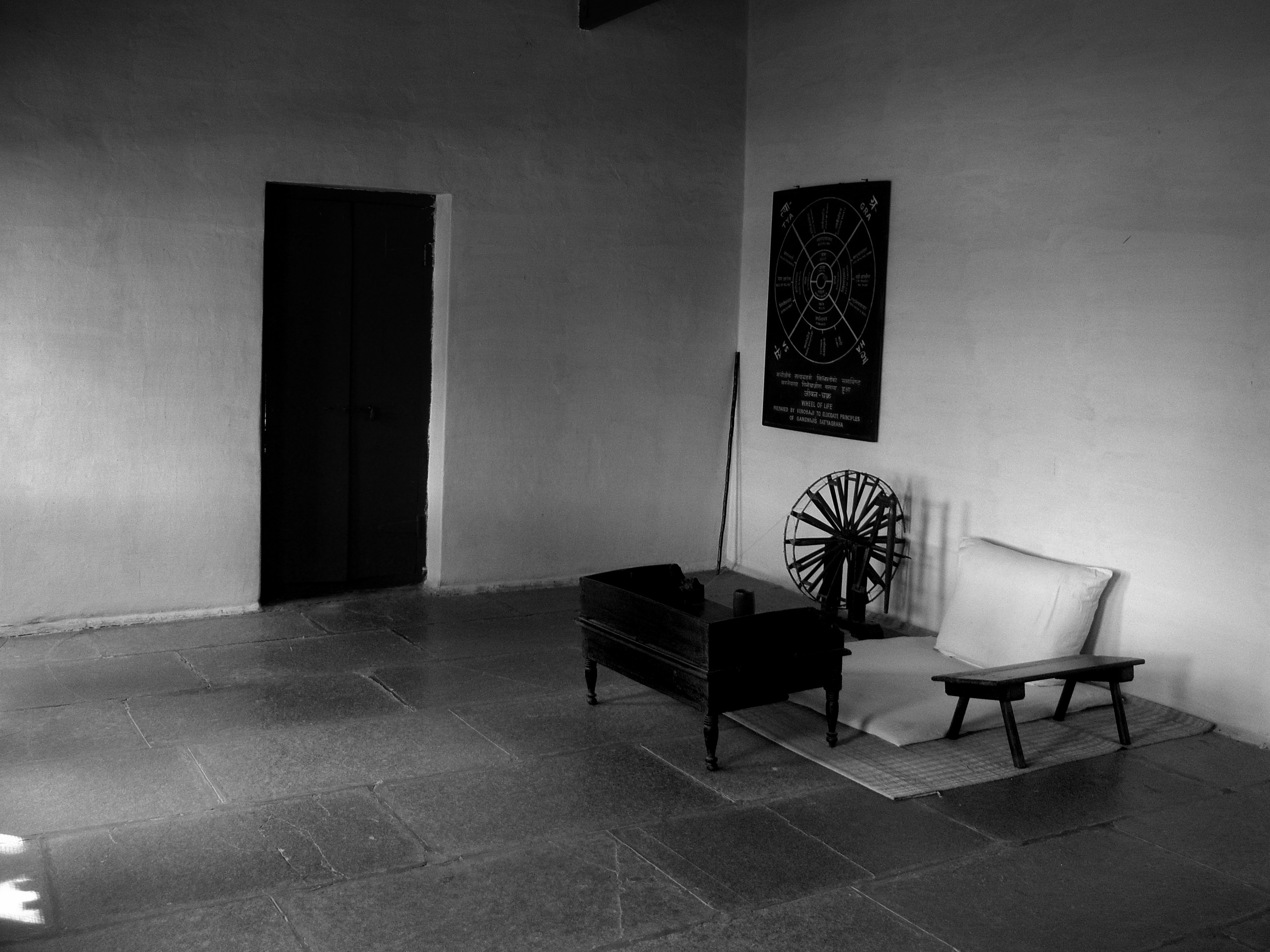
Mahatma Gandhi's Visitor Room at Hridaya Kunj

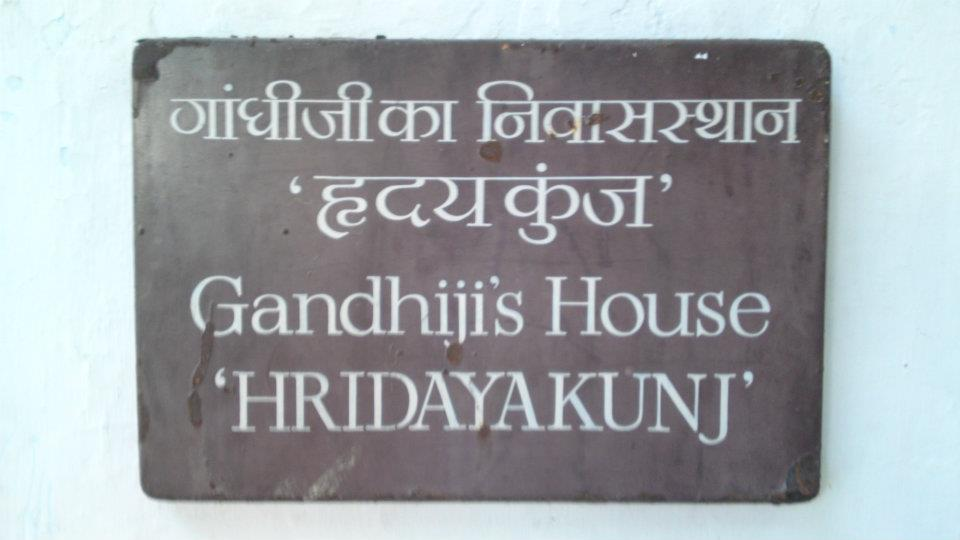
Kunj, at Sabarmati Ashram

While at the ashram, Gandhi formed a tertiary school that focused on manual labor, agriculture, and literacy, in order to advance his efforts for the nation's self-sufficiency. It was also from here that on 12 March 1930, Gandhi marched to Dandi, 241 miles from the ashram, with 78 companions in protest against British Salt Law, which increased taxes on Indian salt in an effort to raise taxes amid the Great Depression. It was this march and the subsequent illegal production of salt (Gandhi boiled salty mud in seawater) that spurred hundreds of thousands across India to join in the illegal production, buying, or selling of salt. This mass act of civil disobedience, in turn, led to the imprisonment of some 60,000 by the British Raj over the following three weeks. Subsequently, the government seized the ashram. Gandhi later asked the Government to give it back but they were unwilling. By 22 July 1933, he had already decided to disband the ashram, which had become a deserted place after the detention of so many. Then local citizens decided to preserve it. On 12 March 1930, Gandhi vowed that he would not return to the ashram until India had gained independence and Gandhi did not come back to Sabarmati Ashram, having shifted to his new ashram at Wardha.

== Present day ==
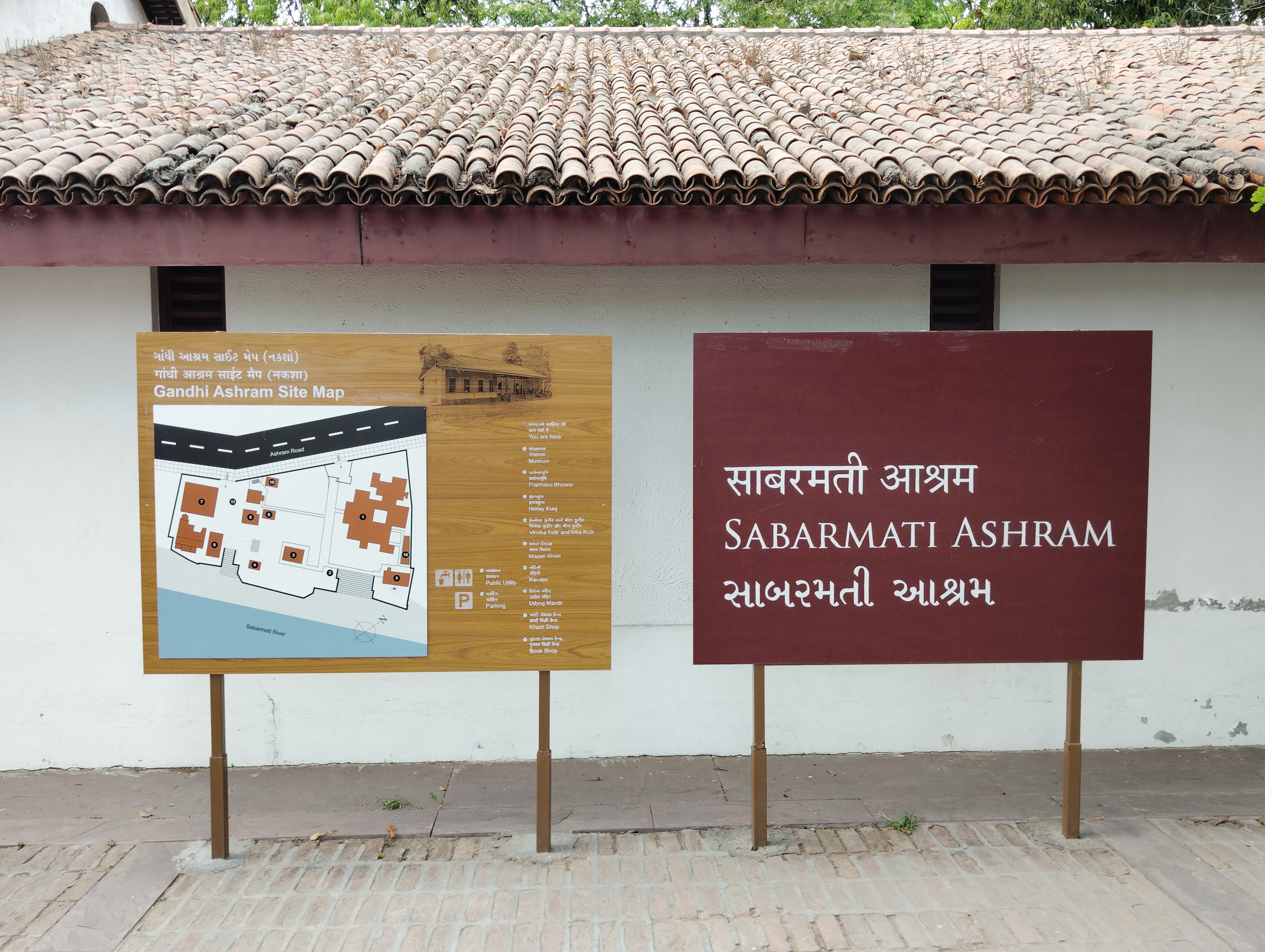
Sabarmati Ashram Site Map

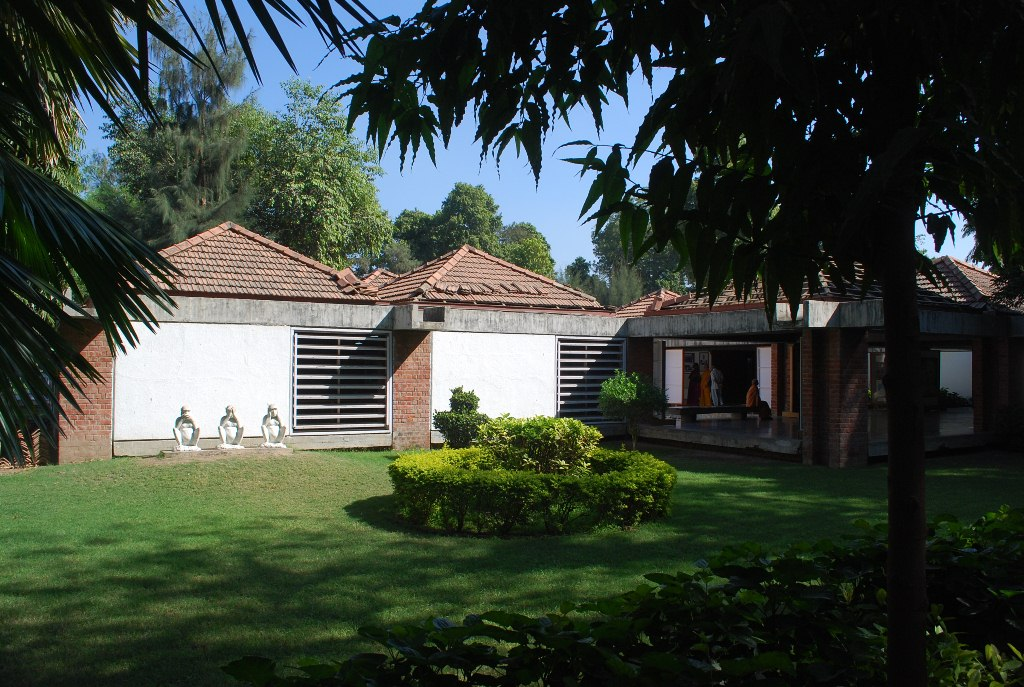
Gandhi Smarak Sangrahalaya

The ashram now has a museum, the Gandhi Smarak Sangrahalaya. This had originally been located in Hridaya Kunj, Gandhi's own cottage in the ashram. Then in 1963, having been designed by the architect Charles Correa, the museum was built. The Sangrahalaya was then re-located into the well-designed and well-furnished museum building and was inaugurated by Jawaharlal Nehru, Prime Minister of India on 10 May 1963. Memorial activities could then continue.

Many buildings in the Ashram have names. There is a rich history of Gandhi's naming practices. At least some of the names of the buildings in the ashram, such as Nandini, and Rustom Block date back to the 1920s, as is evident in a letter Gandhi wrote to Chhaganlal Joshi, the Ashram's new manager after Maganlal Gandhi's death in April 1928.

Some of the names of the buildings and sites within the ashram are:

- Nandini: This is an old ashram guest house where visitors from India and abroad are accommodated. It is situated on the right hand side of Hridaya Kunj.
- Vinoba Kutir: This cottage is named after Acharya Vinoba Bhave who stayed here. Today It is also known as Mira Kutir after Gandhiji's disciple Mirabehn who later lived there, following Gandhi's principles. She was the daughter of a British Rear-Admiral.
- Upasana Mandir: This is an open-air prayer ground, where after Prayers Gandhiji would refer to individual's questions and as head of family would try to analyse and solve these queries. It is situated between Hridaya Kunj and Magan Nivas.
- Magan Niwas: This hut used to be the home of the ashram manager, Maganlal Gandhi. Maganlal was the cousin of Gandhi who he called the soul of the ashram.

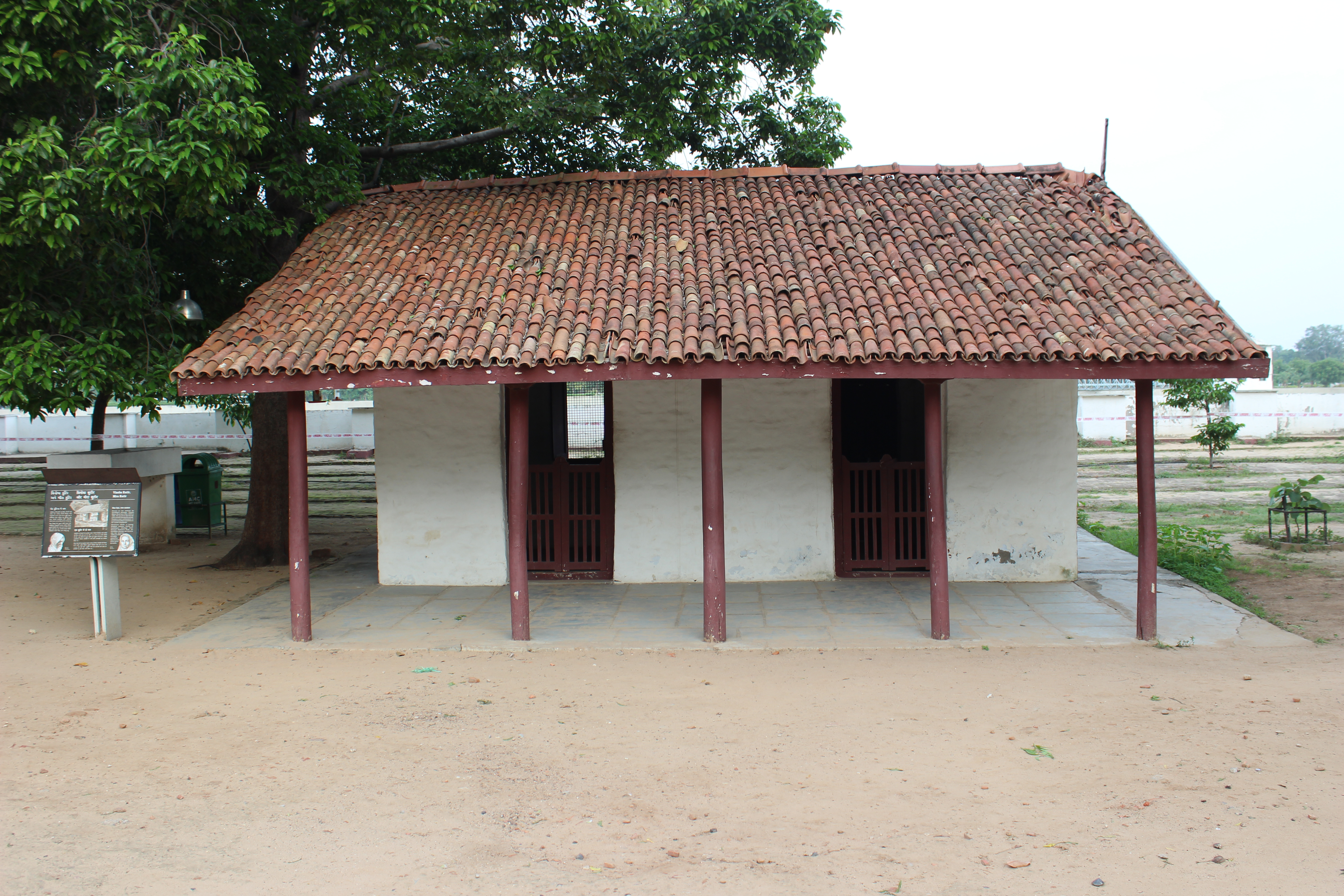
Vinoba Kutir

=== Museum features ===
- "My life is my message" gallery, consisting of 8 life-size paintings and more than 250 photo-enlargements of some of the most vivid and historic events of Gandhi's life
- Gandhi in Ahmedabad Gallery, tracking Gandhi's life in Ahmedabad from 1915 to 1930
- Life-size oil painting gallery
- Exhibition showing quotations, letters and other relics of Gandhi
- Library consisting of nearly 35,000 books dealing with Gandhi's life, work, teachings, Indian freedom movement and allied subjects, and a Reading Room with more than 80 periodicals in English, Gujarati and Hindi
- Archives consisting of nearly 34,117 letters to and from Gandhi both in original and in photocopies, about 8,781 pages of manuscripts of Gandhi's articles appearing in Harijan, Harijansevak, and Harijanbandhu and about 6,000 photographs of Gandhi and his associates
- An important landmark of the ashram is Gandhi's cottage 'Hridaya Kunj', where some of the personal relics of Gandhi are displayed
- Ashram book store, non-profit making, which sells literature and memorabilia related to Gandhi and his life's work such as the Charkha, Three Monkeys, Postcards etc which in turn supports local artisans.

=== Ashram activities ===
- The Sabarmati Ashram receives about 700,000 visitors a year. It is open every day from 08:00 to 19:00.
- Collecting, processing, preserving and displaying archival materials such as writings, photographs, paintings, voice-records, films and personal effects.
- The charkha used by Gandhi to spin khadi and the writing table he used for writing letters are also some of items kept.

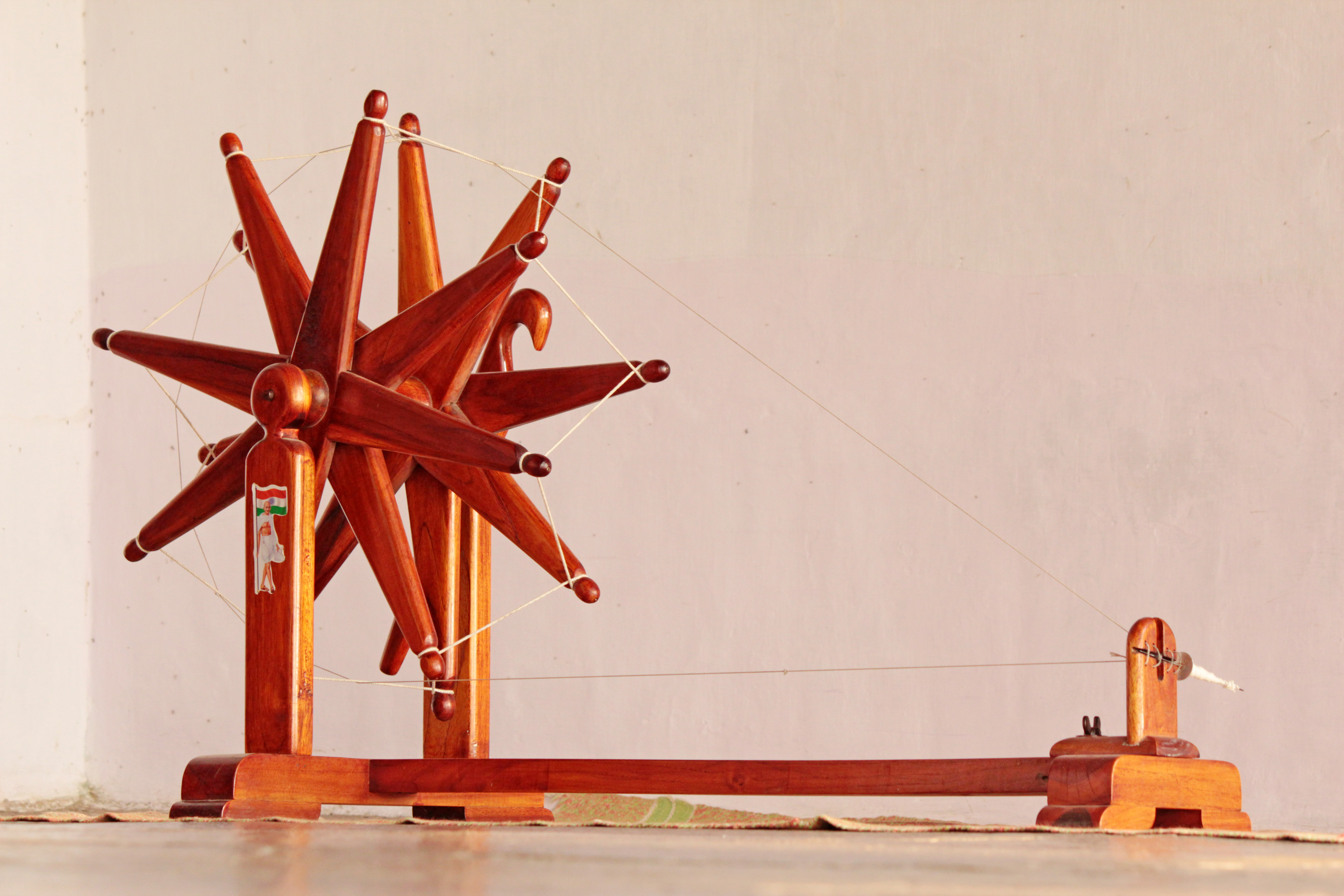
Charkha kept at Gandhi Ashram

- Microfilming, lamination and preservation of negatives.
- Arranging exhibitions on different aspects of Gandhi's life, literature and activities
- Publication of the "Mahadevbhani Diary", which chronicles the entire history of the Indian independence movement.
- The Ashram Trust funds activities that include education for the visitor and the community and routine maintenance of the museum and its surrounding grounds and buildings.
- Helping and undertaking study and research in Gandhian thought and activities. Publishing the results of study and research.
- Observance of occasions connected with Gandhi's life.
- Maintaining contact with youths and students, and providing facilities for them to study Gandhian thought.

=== Walking tours ===
With prior appointment from The Secretary, Gandhi Ashram Preservation and Memorial Trust, a walking tour can be organised. This 90-minute guided tour starts with a slide show and ends at the Library. The tour visits the following places:

- Magan Niwas – Magan Gandhi – Exhibits different designs of charkhas.

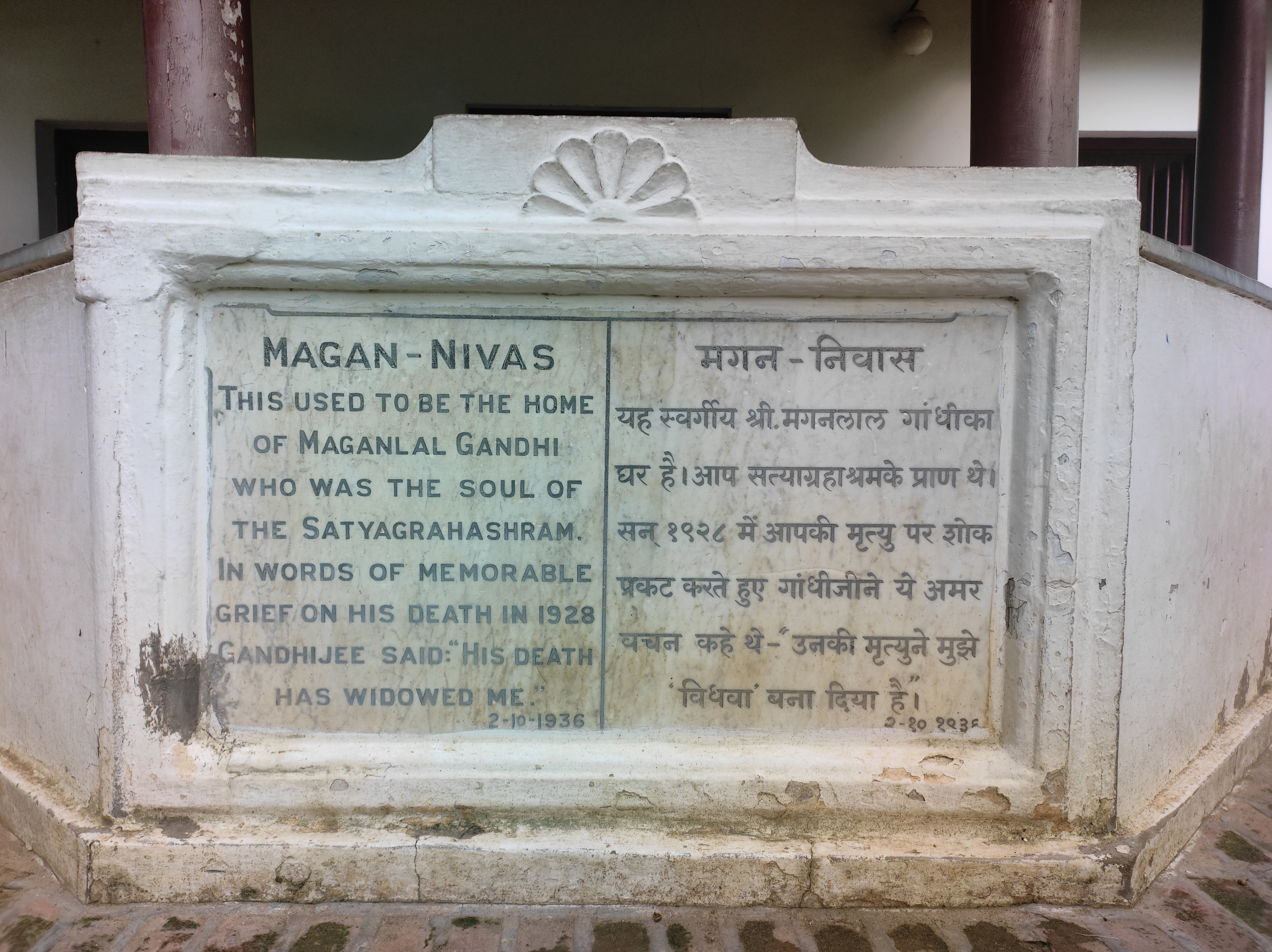
Plaque at Magan Nivas

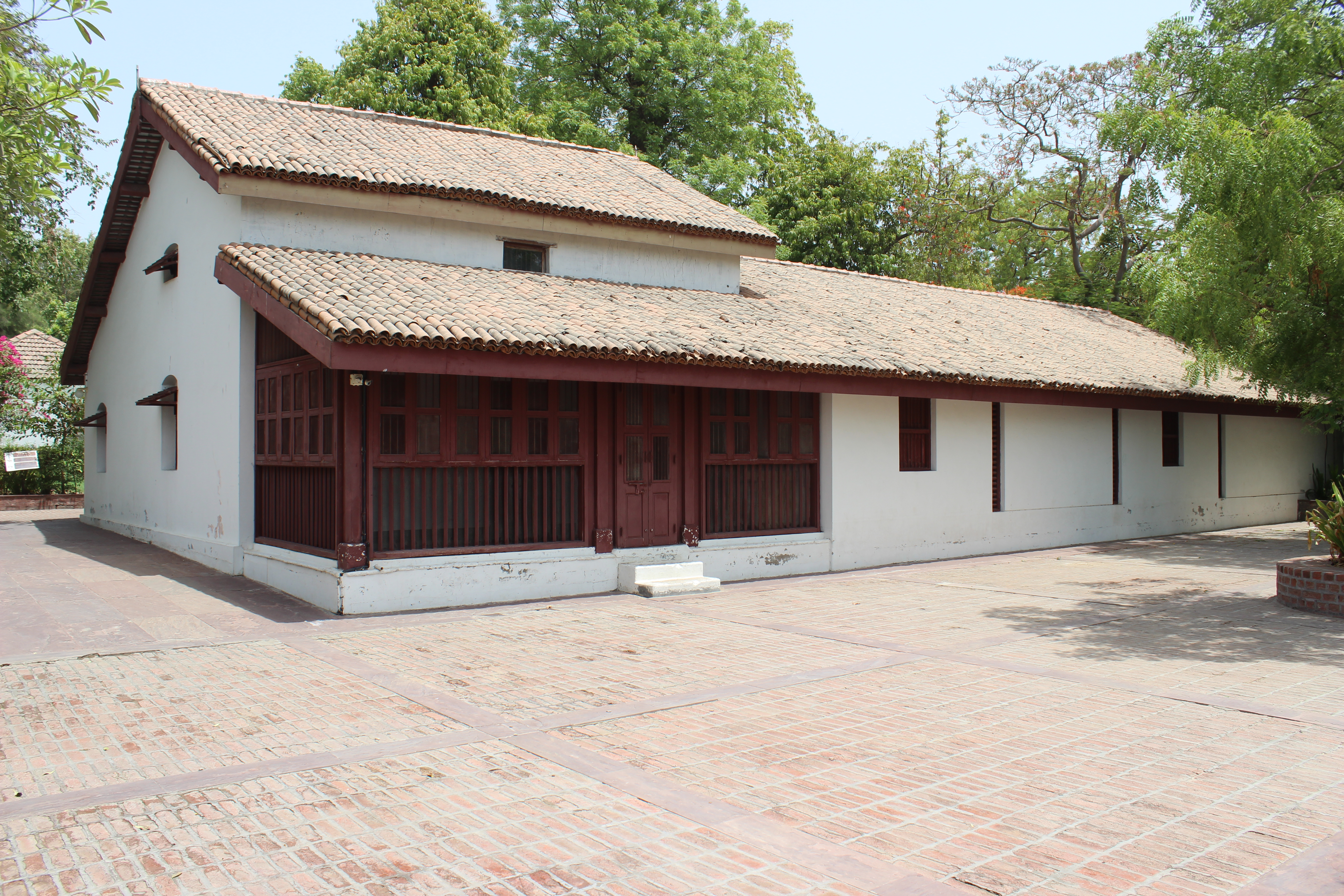
Front view of Magan Nivas

- Upasana Mandir – Prayer Ground where the ashramite listened to bhajans (devotional songs) and readings from the Holy Gita, Quran and Bible.
- Hriday Kunj
- Vinoba-Mira Kutir – The hut where Vinoba Bhave and Madeleine (renamed Miraben by Gandhi) the daughter of the British Rear-Admiral Sir Edmond Slade stayed on various occasions.
- Nandini – This was the guest house of the ashram.
- Udyog Mandir – A temple of industry symbolizing self-reliance and dignity of labour.
- Somnath Chattralaya – A cluster of rooms occupied by ashramities who forsook family affairs and shared ashram life.
- Teacher's Niwas – Bapu's associates stayed at teacher's chalet
- Gandhi in Ahmedabad – This gallery exhibits major events of Gandhiji's life from 1915 to 1930 in Ahmedabad.
- Painting Gallery – Eight life size paintings have been displayed.
- My life is my message – Events which were turning points in Gandhiji's life and which ultimately changed the history of India are depicted through oil paintings and photographs.
- Library and archives – Archives preserve the legacy of eternal Gandhi in 34,000 manuscripts, 150 felicitations, 6,000 photo negatives, and 200 files of photostats. The Library has 35,000 books including 4,500 books from Mahadevbhai Desai's personal collection and books on Gandhian thought. It is an invaluable resource for researchers. There are also many other rare books of all religions. The library's opening hours are from 11:00 to 18:00. Books cannot be borrowed but can be read in the Library.

== Gallery ==
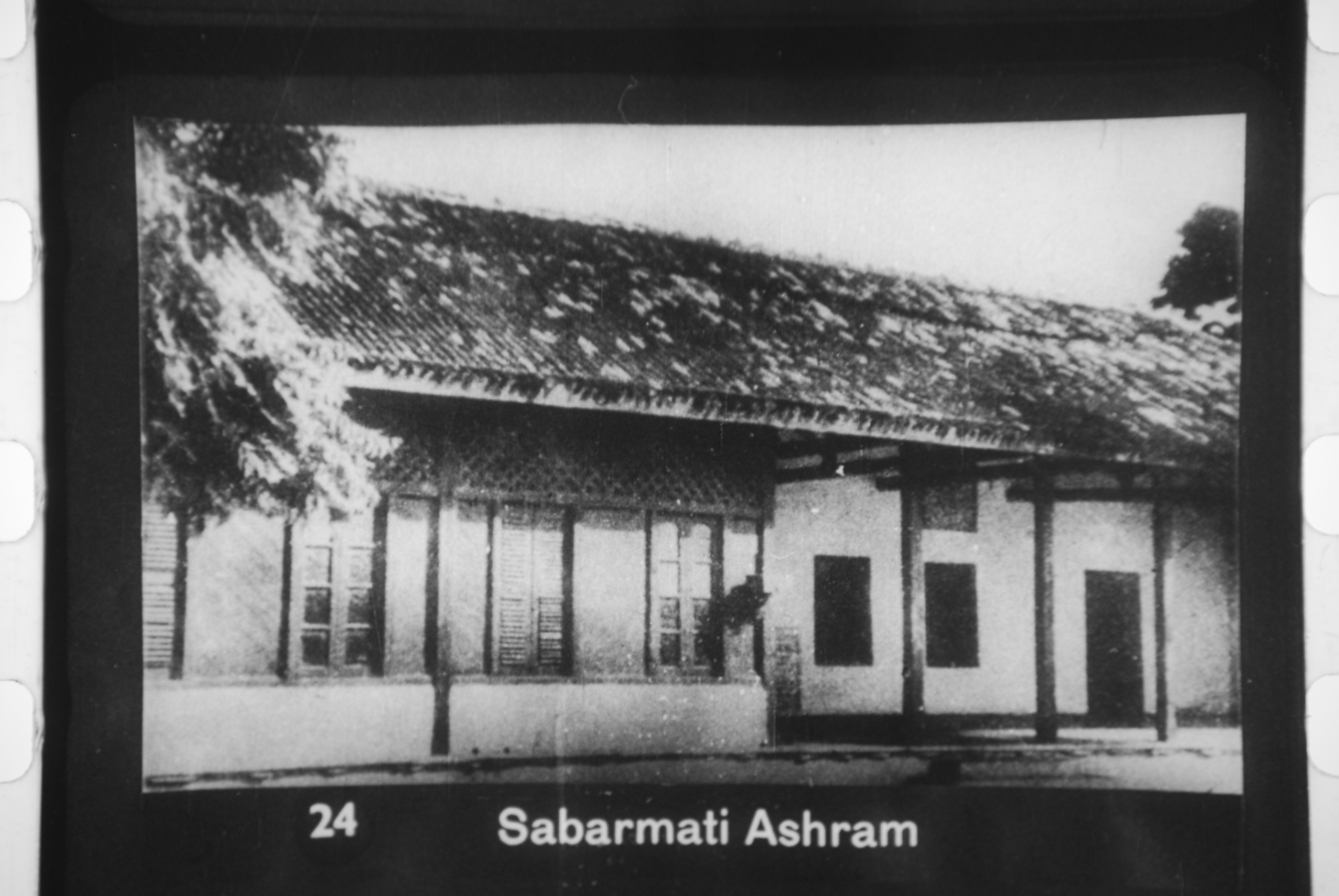
Sabarmati Ashram in 1948

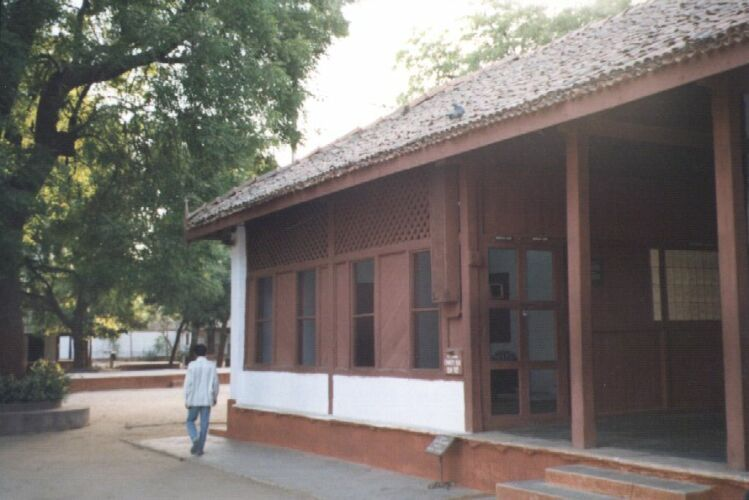
Front view of Gandhi's House

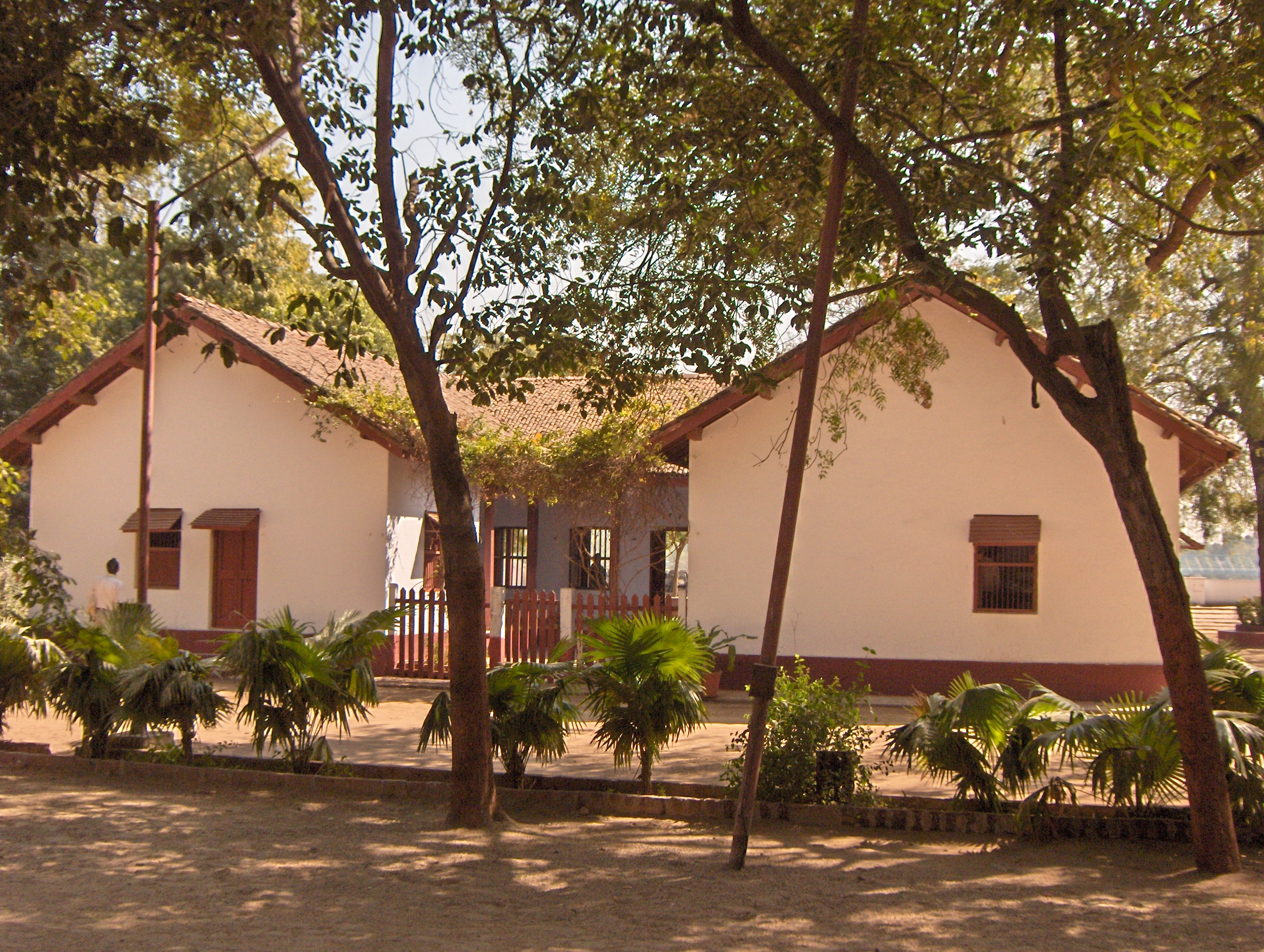
Back view of Gandhi's house

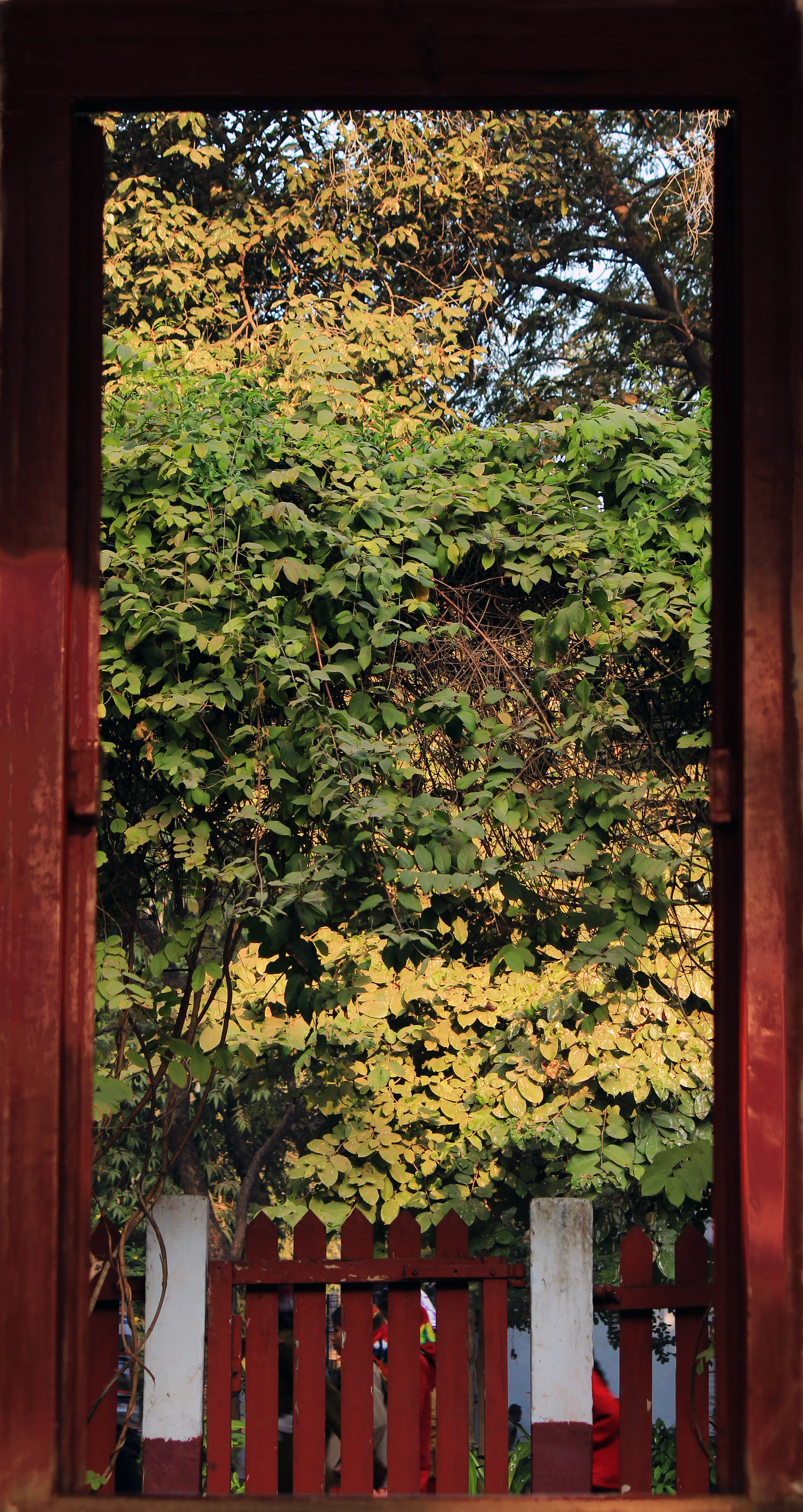
View from the door of Gandhi's house

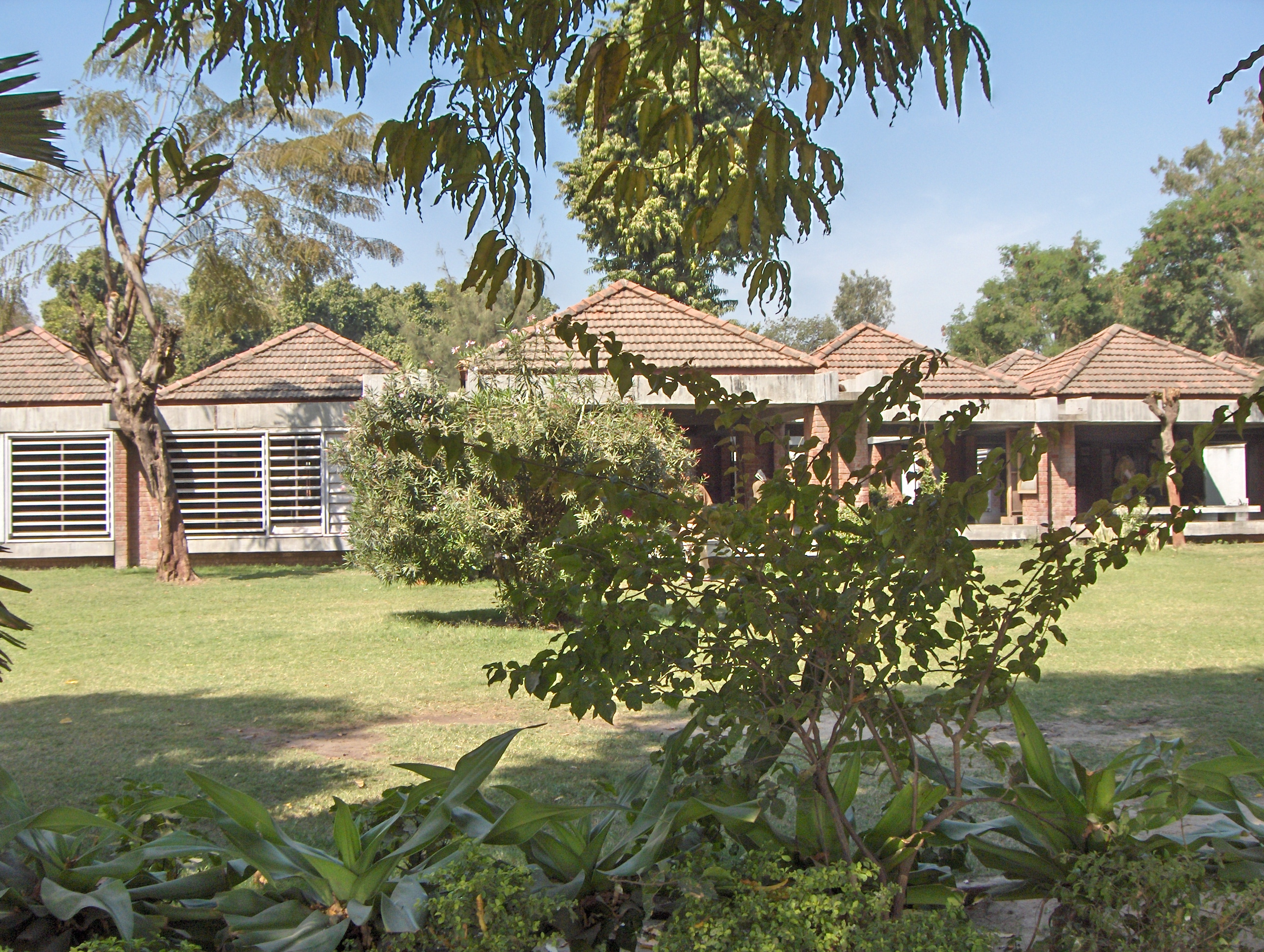
Gandhi Sangrahlay - Outside

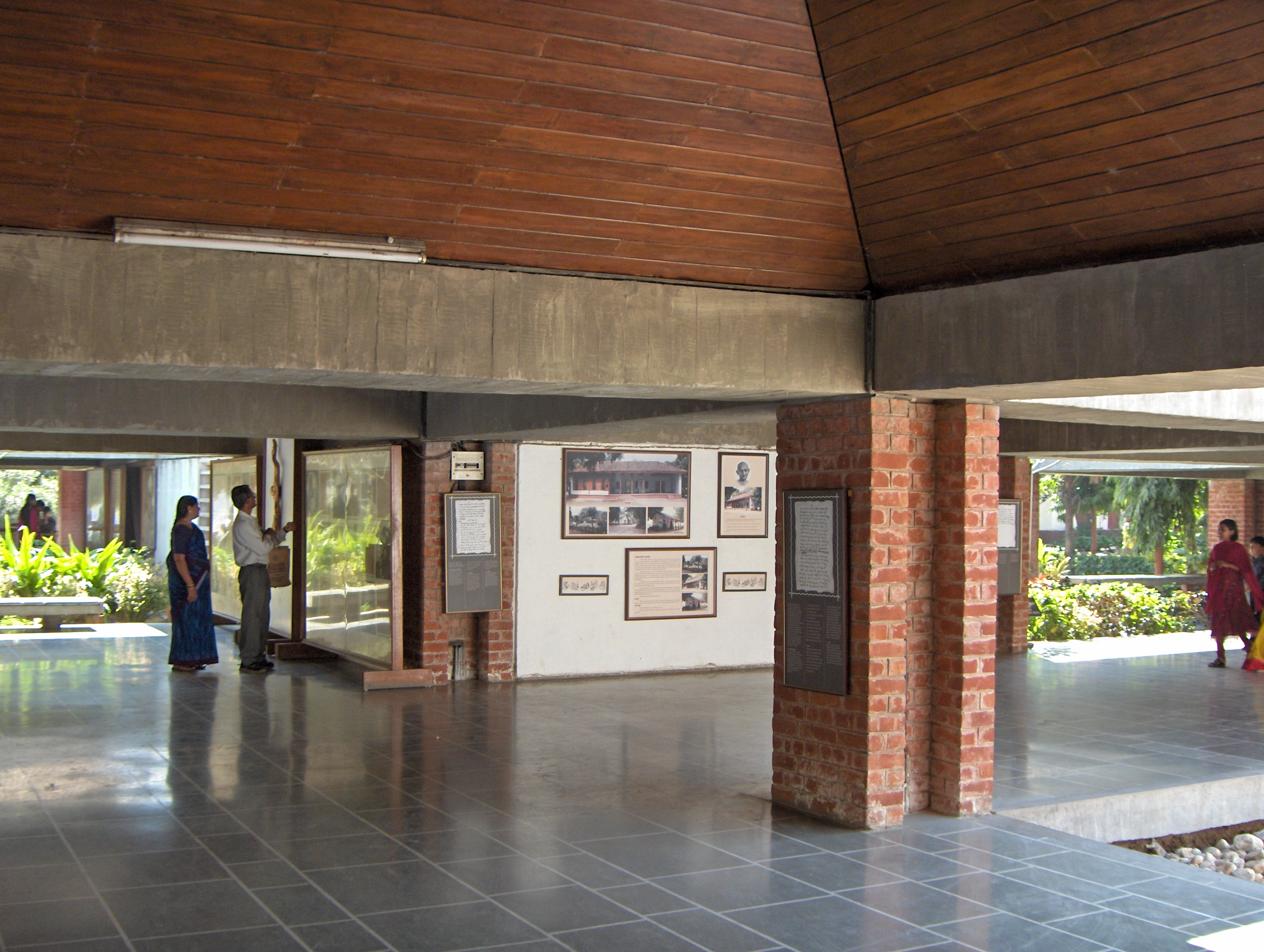
Gandhi Sangrahlay - Inside Corridors

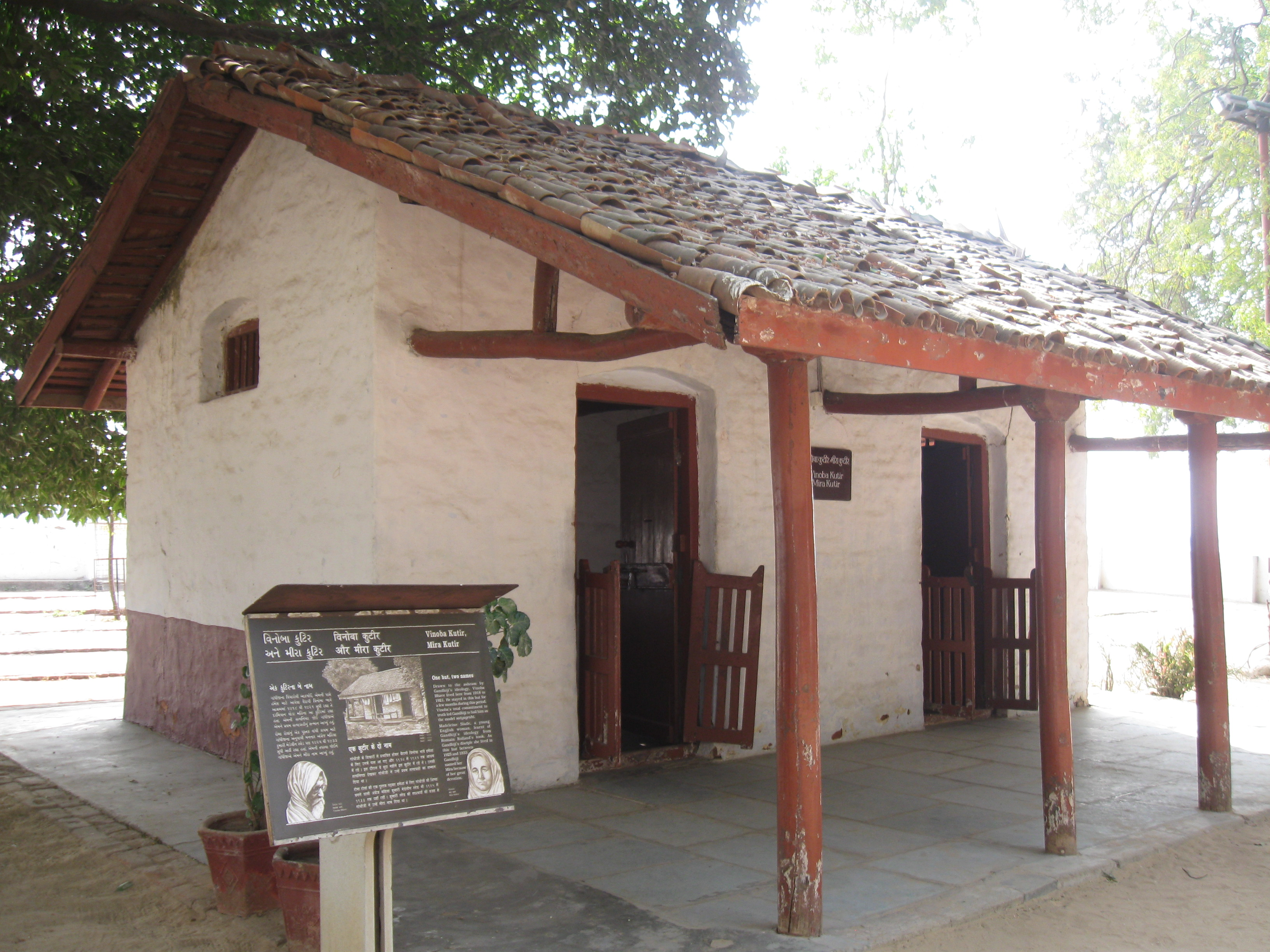
Vinobha Kutir on the shore of Sabamati river

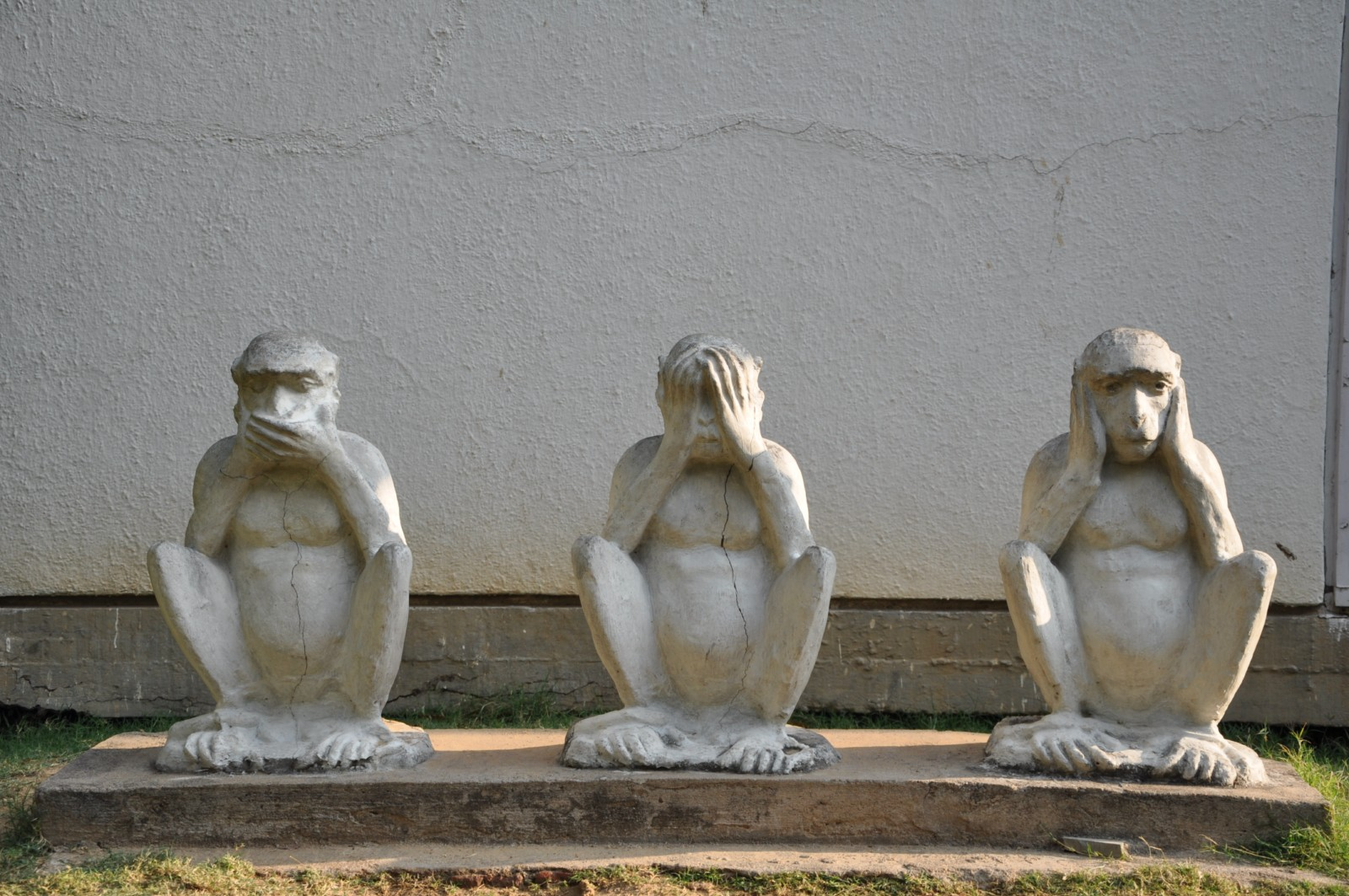
Representation of Gandhi's smaller statue of the three wise monkeys

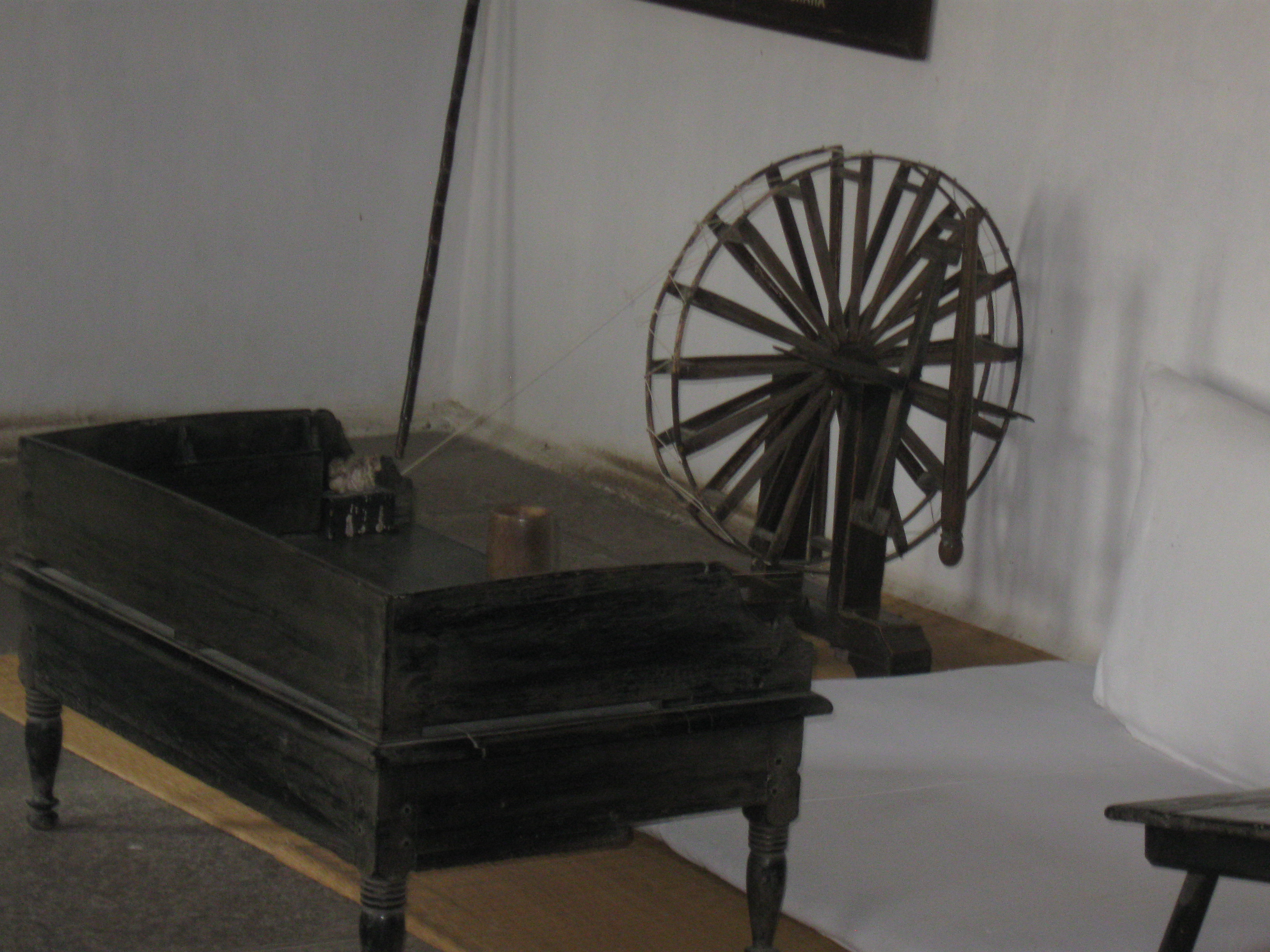
Gandhiji's Charkha and table

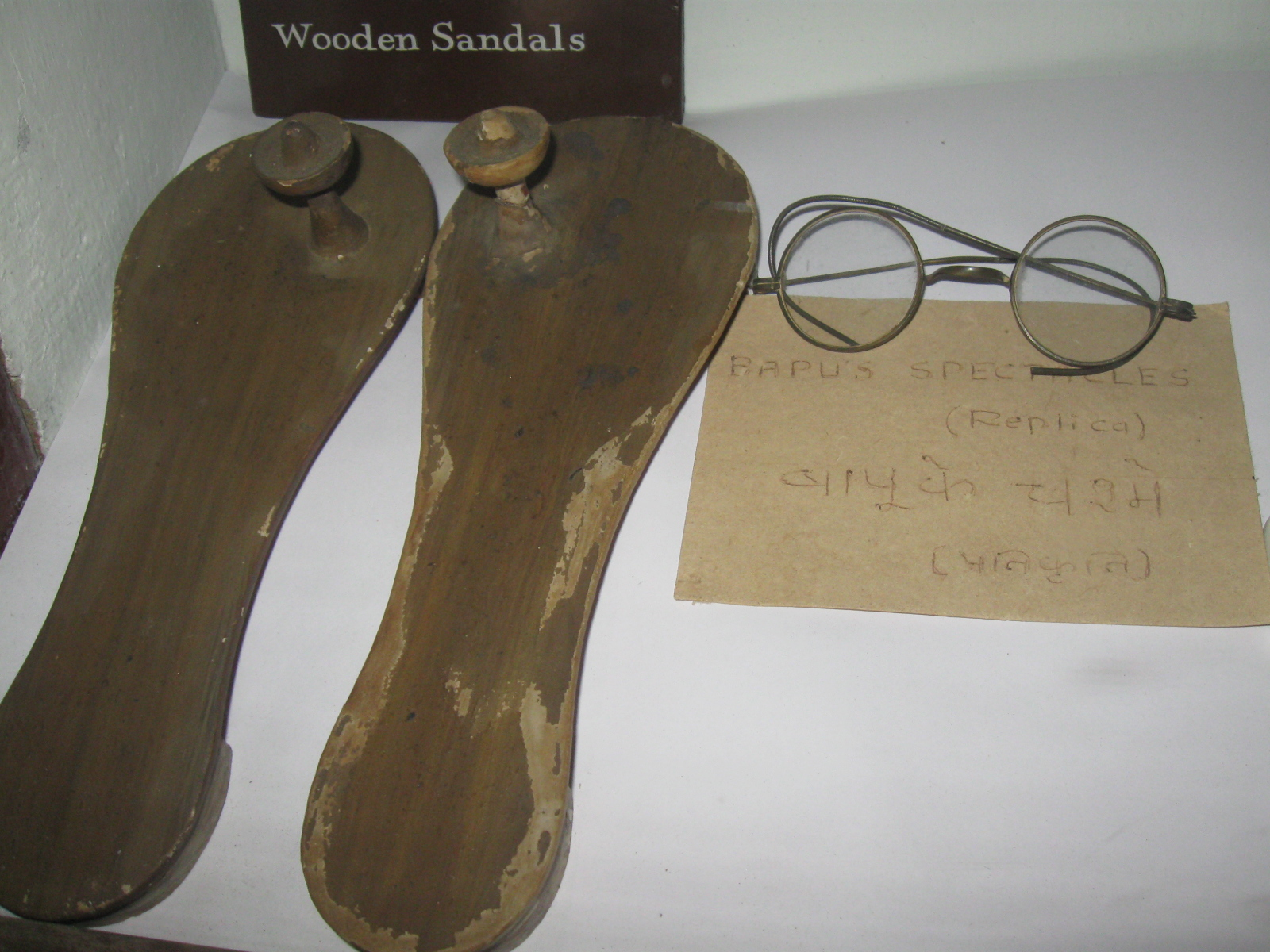
Gandhiji's Chappal and Spectacles

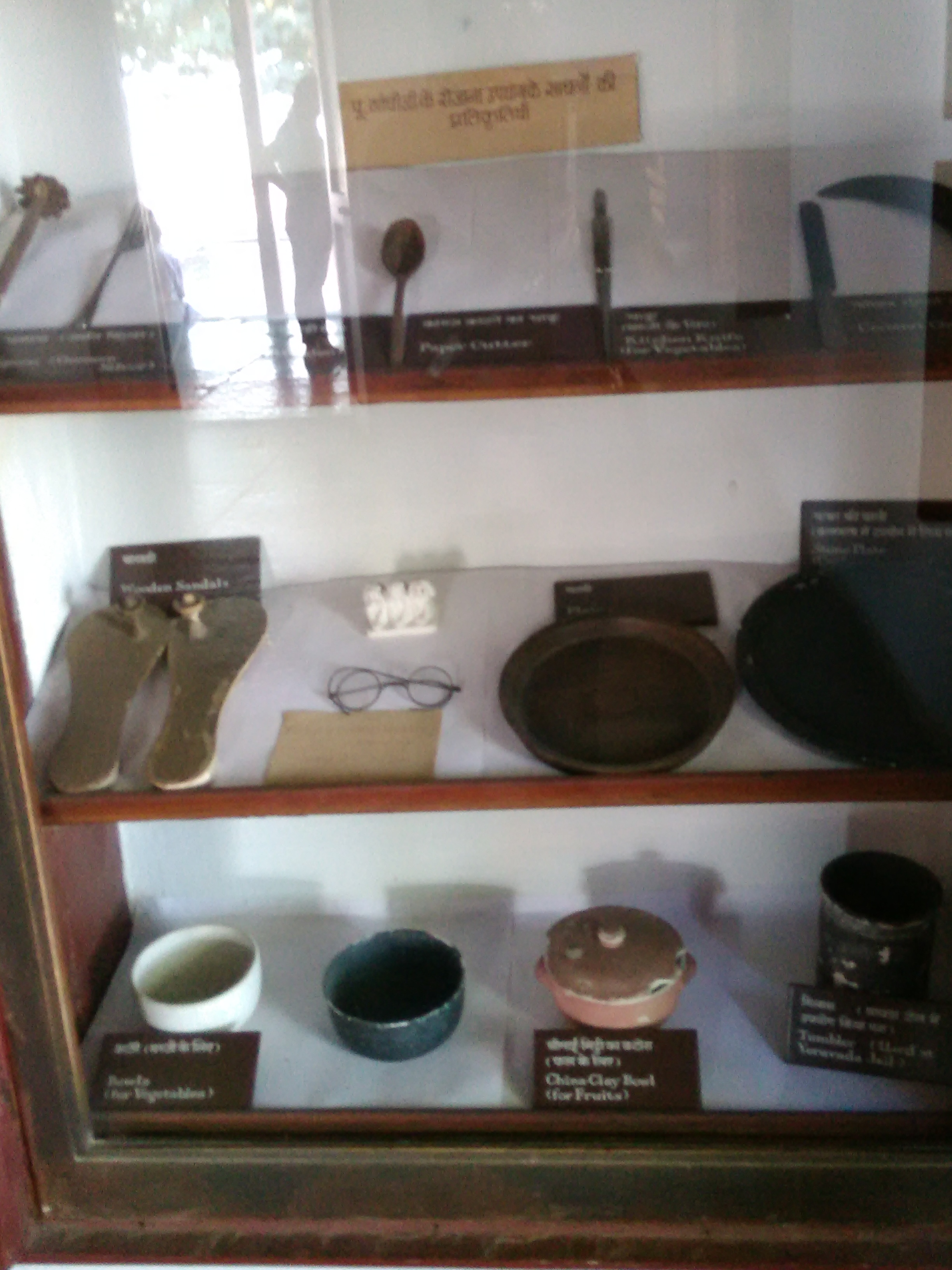
Artifacts used by Mahatma Gandhi and Kasturabaa Gandhi

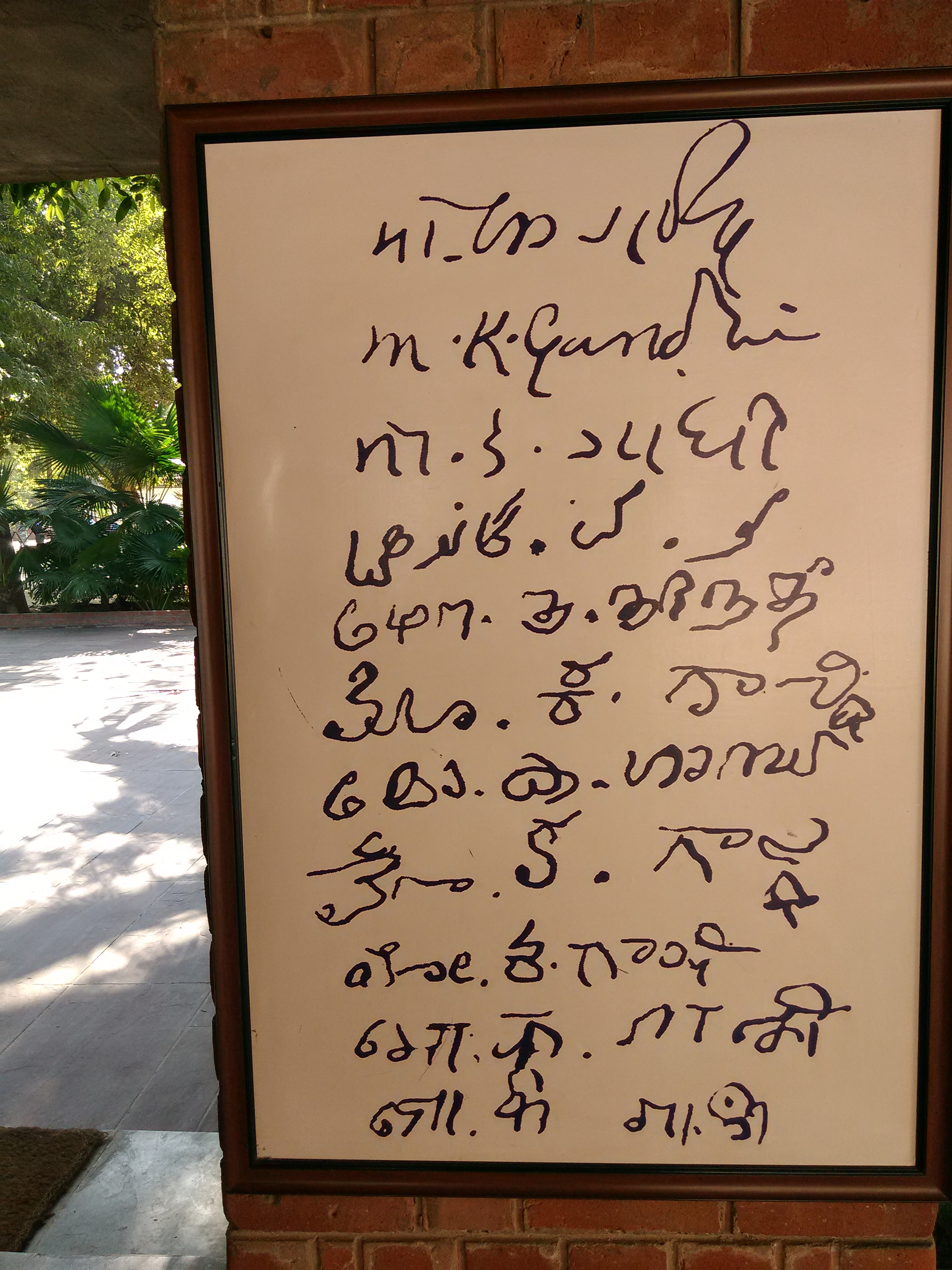
Enlarged replika of Mahatma Gandhi's signature in different languages

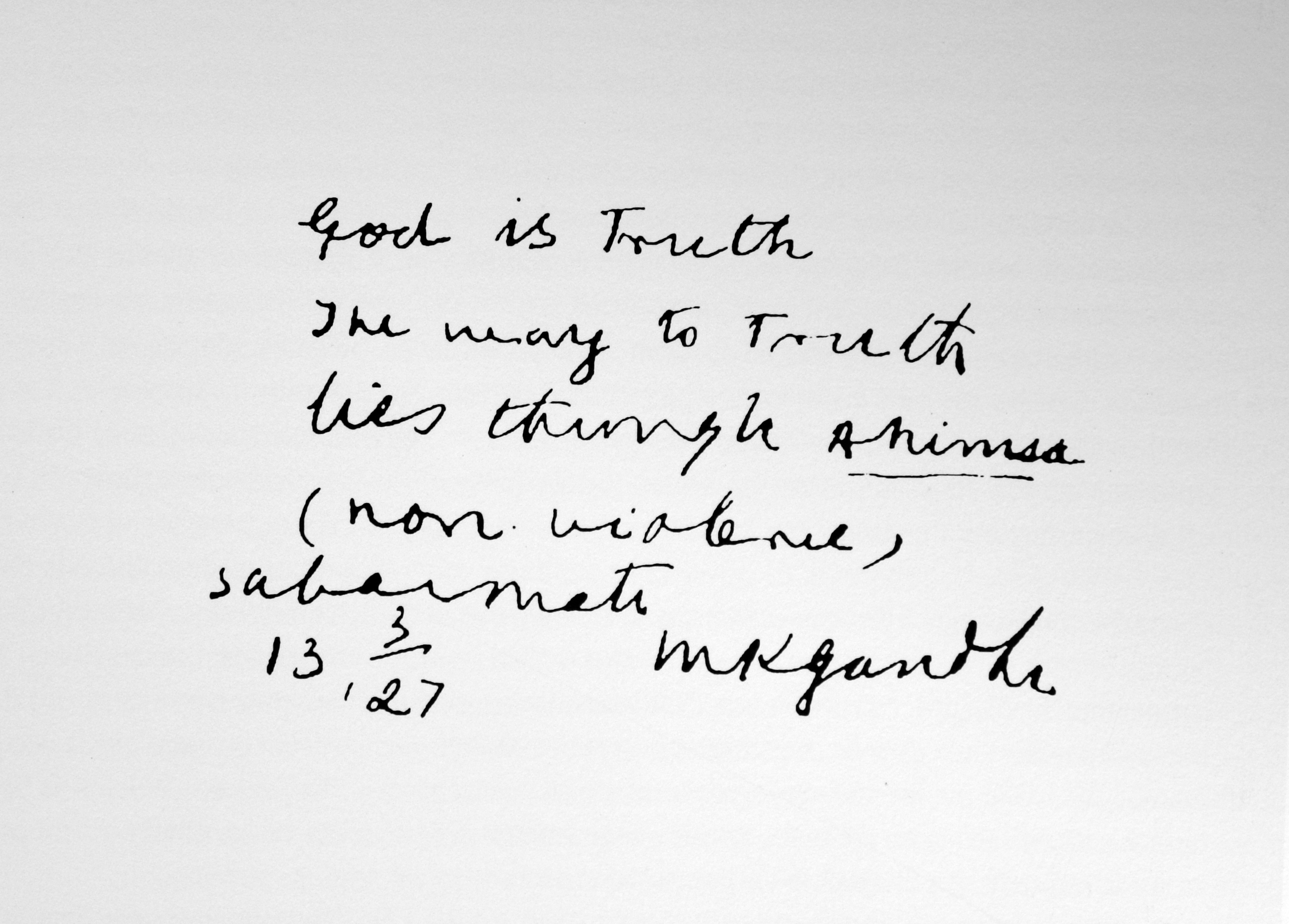
God is Truth, c. 1927

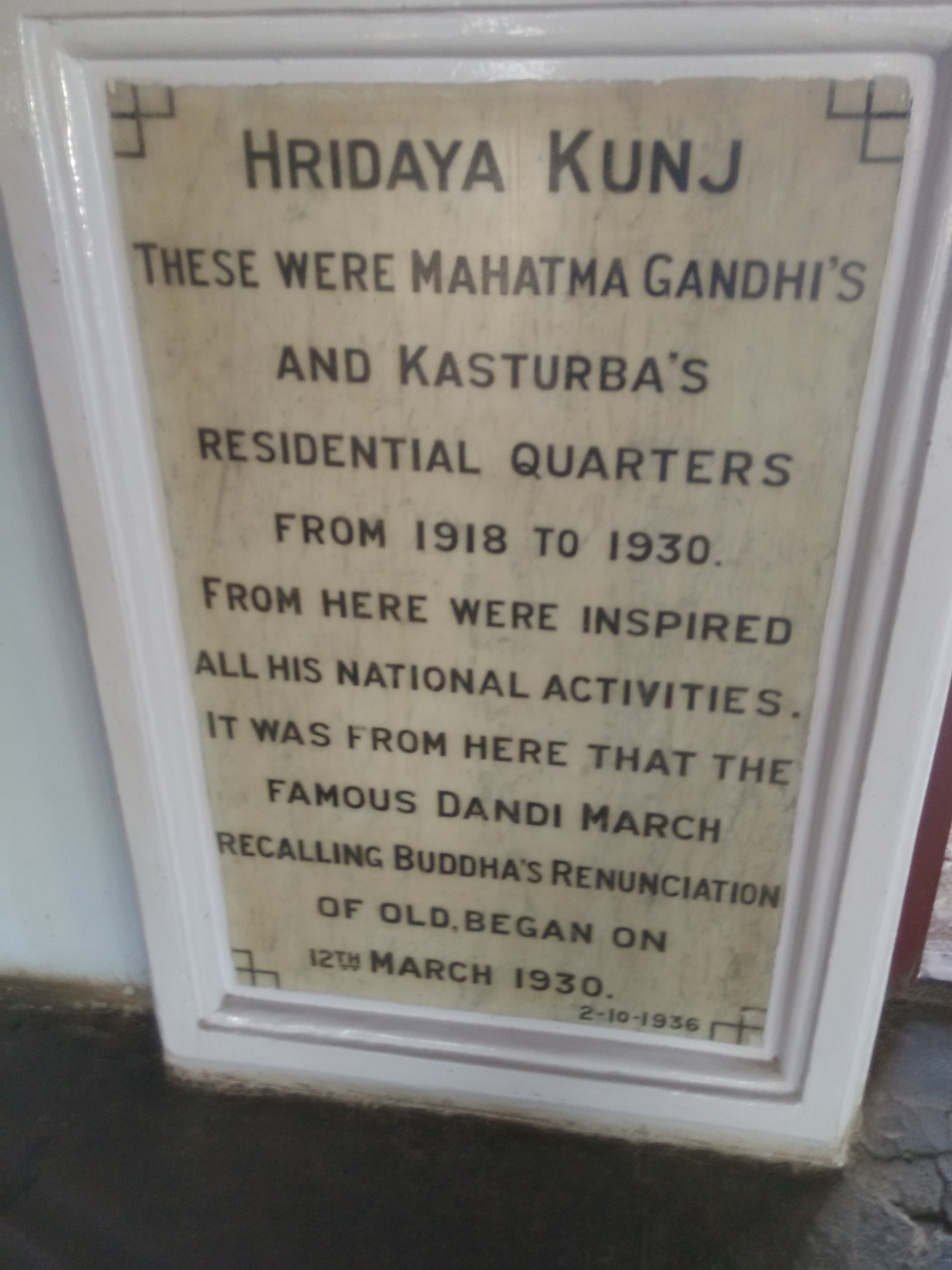
The stone writings in front of Maganlaal Gandhi's kutira Hrudaya Kunja

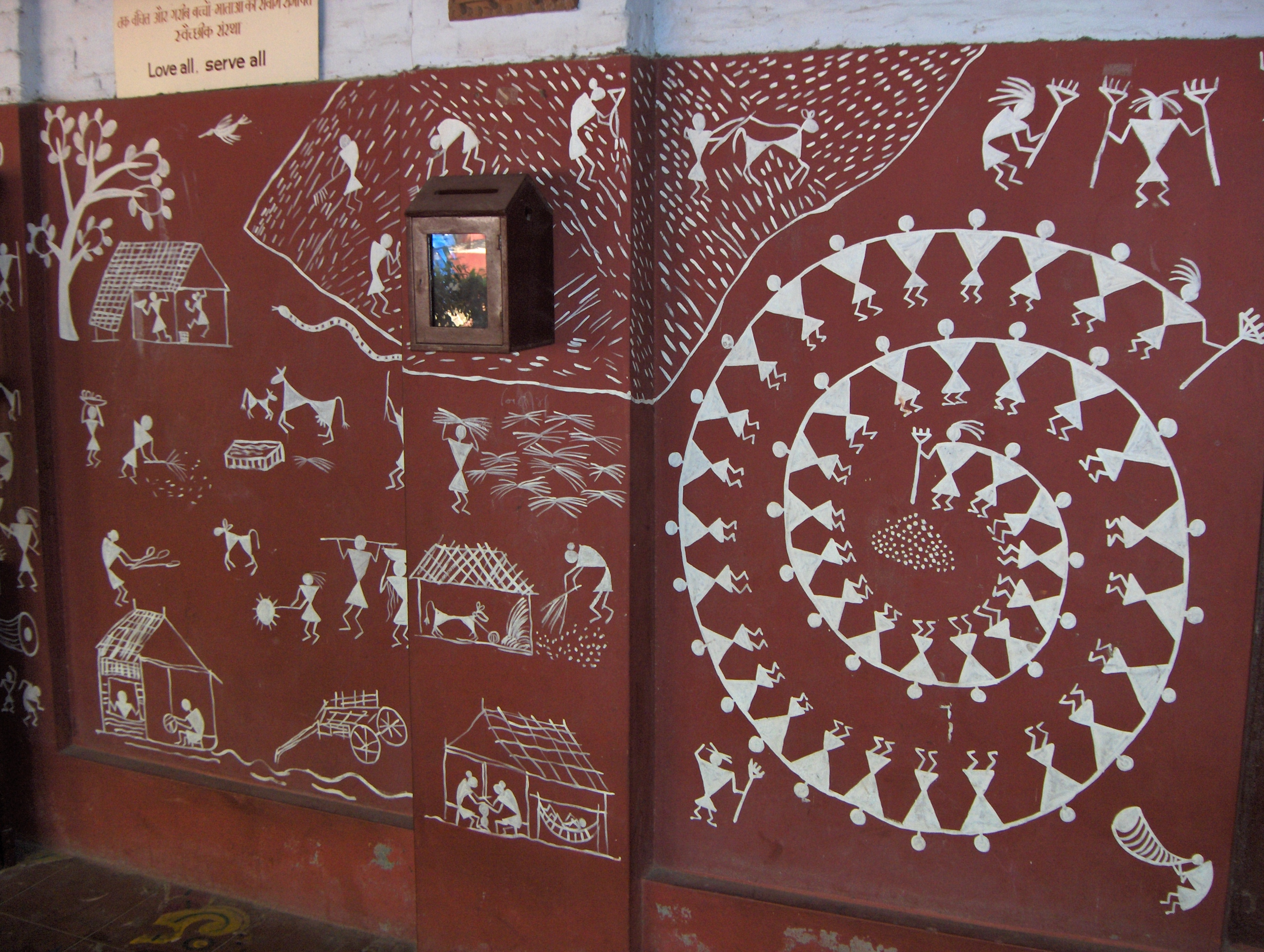
Warli art at Sabarmati Ashram

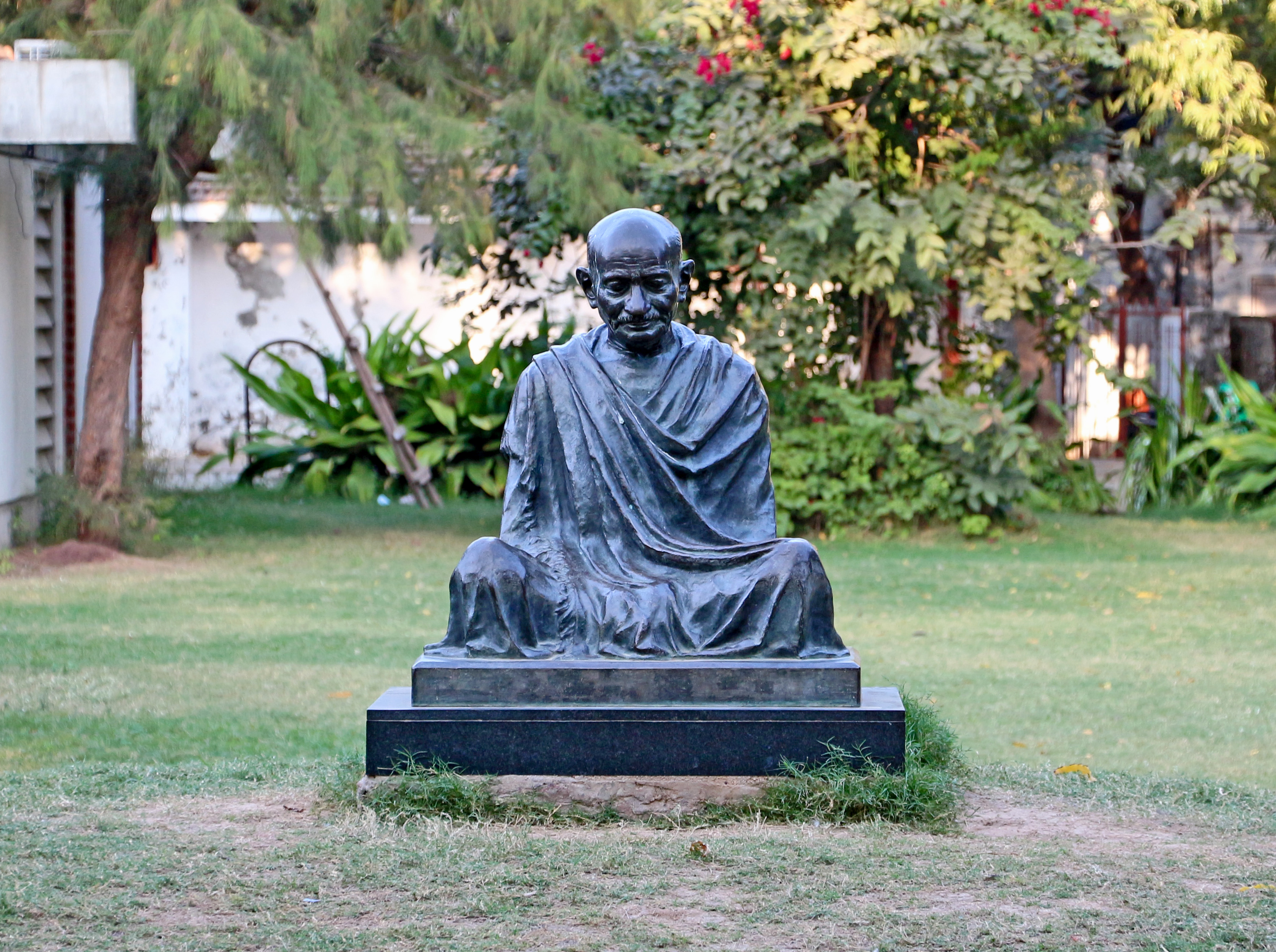
Statue of Mahatma Gandhi at the ashram

== See also ==
- Tolstoy Farm
- Kochrab Ashram
- Sevagram
- Sadaqat Ashram
- National Gandhi Museum
- Gandhi Memorial Museum, Madurai
- Eternal Gandhi Multimedia Museum
- Gandhi Heritage Portal
- Gandhi Memorial Asram
