= Maganlal Gandhi =

Indian writer; Gandhi family member

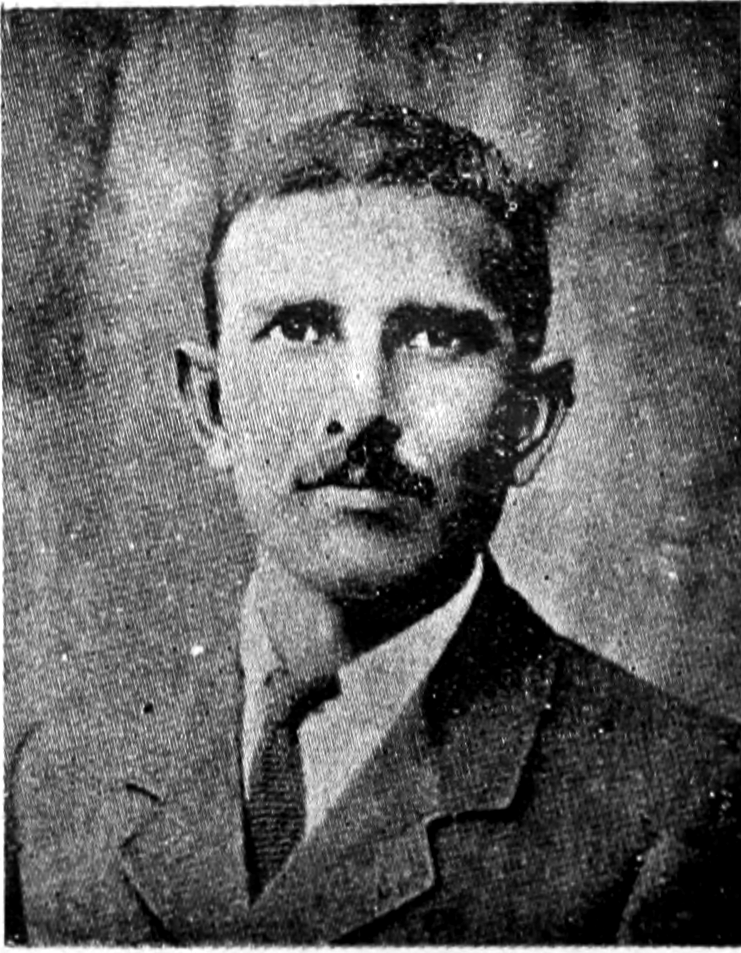
Maganlal Gandhi

Maganlal Khushalchand Gandhi (1883–1928) was a follower of Mohandas Gandhi. He was a first cousin of Mahatma Gandhi.

Maganlal Gandhi is cited in many works of Mahatma Gandhi. It is he who suggested that the word ( Sadagraha : means firmness in a good cause. Later in Gandhi’s journey he changed it to satyagraha) Satyagraha should define Gandhi's nonviolence methods. According to Gandhi, Maganlal was the heart and soul of Sabarmati Ashram. He followed Gandhi in South Africa in 1903 "in the hope of making a bit of fortune." However, he ended up following his uncle's self-imposed poverty and joined the Phoenix Settlement.

When Gandhi reached India and Bombay for the first time on 9 January 1915, Maganlal Gandhi along with other Indian nationalists like Narottam Morarji, Bhalchandra Krishna, B. G. Horniman, Revashanker Zaveri, J. B. Petit took a launch to reach the steamer to welcome Kasturba and Mohandas Gandhi at Apollo bunder, where a large crowd had gathered to welcome Gandhi.

Manganlal was in Champaran in Bihar working for women upliftment and propagating satyagraha, when got pnemonia due to cold and later he died of typhoid at Patna on 23 April 1928.
