= Tolstoy Farm =

Ashram initiated and organised by Gandhi in South Africa

- Town/City: Lenasia
- Province: Gauteng
- Country: South Africa
- Coordinates: 26.364014°S 27.8159265°E

Tolstoy Farm was an ashram initiated and organised by Mohandas Gandhi during his South African movement. At its creation in 1910 the ashram served as the headquarters of the campaign of satyagraha against discrimination against Indians in Transvaal, where it was located. The ashram, Gandhi's second in South Africa (the first was Phoenix Farm, Natal, in 1904) was named after Russian writer and philosopher Leo Tolstoy, whose 1894 book, The Kingdom of God Is Within You, greatly influenced Gandhi's philosophy of nonviolence.

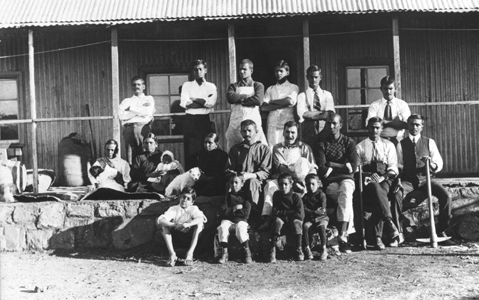
Some members of Tolstoy Farm in 1910, Gandhi is in the middle, second row fifth from the right

Hermann Kallenbach, a Gandhi supporter, allowed Gandhi and seventy to eighty other people to live there as long as their local movement was in effect. Kallenbach suggested the name for the community, which soon constructed three new buildings to serve as living quarters, workshops, and a school. Sjt. Pragji Desai also helped in this programme. There were no servants on the farm, and all the work, from cooking down to scavenging, was done by the inmates.

== See also ==
- Sabarmati Ashram
- Sevagram
