= Maniben Patel =

Indian politician (1903–1990)

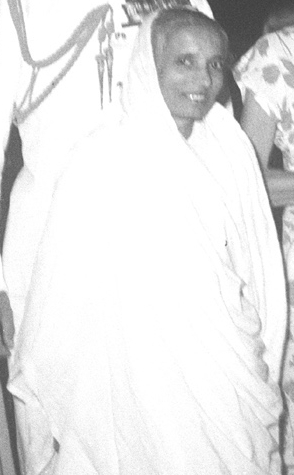
Patel in October 1947

Maniben Patel (24 April 1904 — 26 March 1990) was an Indian politician and daughter of Vallabhbhai Patel. She served as a Member of the Indian parliament. Educated in Bombay, Patel adopted the teachings of Mahatma Gandhi in 1918, and started working regularly at his ashram in Ahmedabad.

She later left Congress and joined opposition Janata Party and won 1977 Lok Sabha seat from Mehsana.

== Early life ==
Patel was born on 24 April 1904 at Karamsad, Bombay Presidency, British India. She was brought up by her uncle Vitthalbhai Patel. She completed her early education at Queen Mary High School in Bombay. In 1920 she moved to Ahmedabad and attended the university of Rashtriya Vidhyapith started by Mahatma Gandhi. After graduating in 1925, Patel went on to assist her father.

== Borsad movement ==
In 1923–24 the British government levied heavy taxes on the common people and for recovery of the same they started confiscating their cattle, land and property. To protest against this oppression, Maniben motivated women to join a campaign led by Gandhi and Sardar Patel and support the No-Tax Movement.

== Bardoli Satyagrah ==
Exorbitant taxation was levied by the British authorities on the peasants of Bardoli in 1928 and they endured similar harassment to those of Borsad. Mahatma Gandhi directed Sardar Vallabhbhai Patel to take leadership of the Satyagrah. Initially women were reluctant to join the movement. Patel, along with Mithuben Petit and Bhaktiba Desai, motivated women who ultimately outnumbered men in the movement. As part of the protest they stayed in huts erected on land confiscated by the government.

== Rajkot Satyagrah ==
During 1938, a Satyagrah was planned against the unjust rule of the Diwan of Rajkot State. Kasturba Gandhi was keen to join the Satyagrah despite her poor health and Patel accompanied her. The government passed an order to separate the women. She went on a hunger strike against the order and authorities allowed her to reunite with Kasturba Gandhi.

== Non-cooperation movement ==
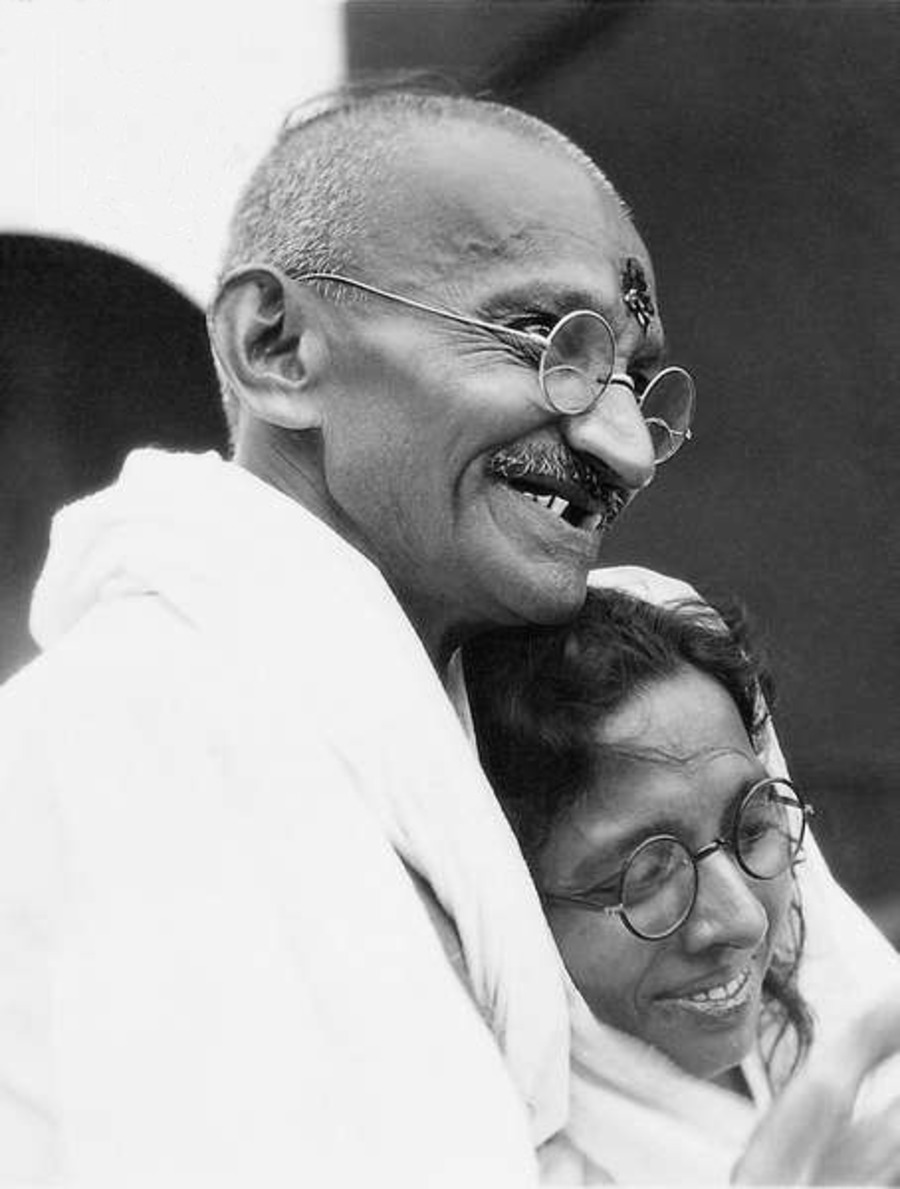
Mahatma Gandhi and Maniben Patel before his departure to Europe, 1931.

She participated in the Non-Cooperation Movement as well as the Salt Satyagraha and was imprisoned for long periods of time. In the 1930s she became her father's aide, also caring for his personal needs. However, because Maniben Patel was committed to the liberation of India, and thus the Quit India movement, she was again imprisoned from 1942 to 1945 in Yerwada Central Jail. Maniben Patel served her father closely until his death in 1950. After moving to Mumbai, she worked for the rest of her life with numerous charitable organizations and for the Sardar Patel Memorial Trust. She went on to author an account of the freedom struggle as a book on her father's life in the years following Indian Independence.

== Principles ==
Patel always ensured that her and her father's clothes were weaved from khadi threads which were spun by her. She always insisted on travelling in third class.

== Electoral career ==
- 1952 : Won South Kaira (a.k.a. Kheda) Lok Sabha seat in General Elections, as Congress candidate
- 1957 : Won Anand Lok Sabha seat in General Elections, as Congress candidate defeated Amin Dadubhai Mulji
- 1962 : Lost to Narendrasinh Ranjithsinh Mahida of Swatantra Party from Anand Lok Sabha Seat, as Congress' candidate
- 1964 to 1970 : Congress Member of Rajya Sabha
- 1973 : Entered Lok Sabha winning the by-poll from Sabarkantha as Congress(O) candidate, defeating Shantubhai Patel of Congress
- 1977 : Won Mehsana Lok Sabha seat in General Elections defeating Natvarlal Amratlal Patel, as Janata Party candidate

== Vice president ==
Patel was once Vice President of the Gujarat Provincial Congress Committee. Later, she was elected as a member of the Indian National Congress led by Nehru in the first Lok Sabha (1952–57) from South Kaira constituency, and in the second Lok Sabha (1957–62) from Anand. She was also Secretary (1953–56) and Vice President (1957–64) of Gujarat state Congress. She was elected to the Rajya Sabha in 1964 and continued till 1970. Information is lacking on the exact year when she left Congress Party, but it was likely because she decided to stay with NCO (Congress-O) when the party split in 1969. Her brother Dahyabhai Patel was a member of Mumbai Maha-nagar Palika for 18 years and was mayor of Mumbai in 1954. In 1957 he joined Maha Gujarat Janata Parishad and later he joined Swatantra Party. In the early 1970s Dahyabhai was a Rajya Sabha MP with Swatantra Party; both Swatantra Party and NCO (Prime Minister Morarji Desai's Congress group) were powerful in Gujarat during the years 1967–1971. Maniben Patel did not contest the 1971 Lok Sabha polls. She was elected to Lok Sabha in 1973 when she won by-poll from Sabarkantha, defeating Shantubhai Patel of Congress by a narrow margin.

She was elected to Lok Sabha from Mehsana on the Janata party ticket in 1977.

She was connected with several educational institutions including the Gujarat Vidyapith, Vallabh Vidyanagar, Bardoli Swaraj Ashram and Navajivan Trust prior to her death in 1990.

In 2011, the Sardar Vallabhbhai Patel Memorial Trust undertook a project to publish her Gujarati diary, in collaboration with Navajivan Publications.

== Works ==
- Inside Story of Sardar Patel: The Diary of Maniben Patel, 1936-50, by Manibahen Patel. Ed. Prabha Chopra. Vision Books, 2001. ISBN 81-7094-424-4.
