= Niranjanaben Mukulbhai Kalarthi =

Indian author and educator

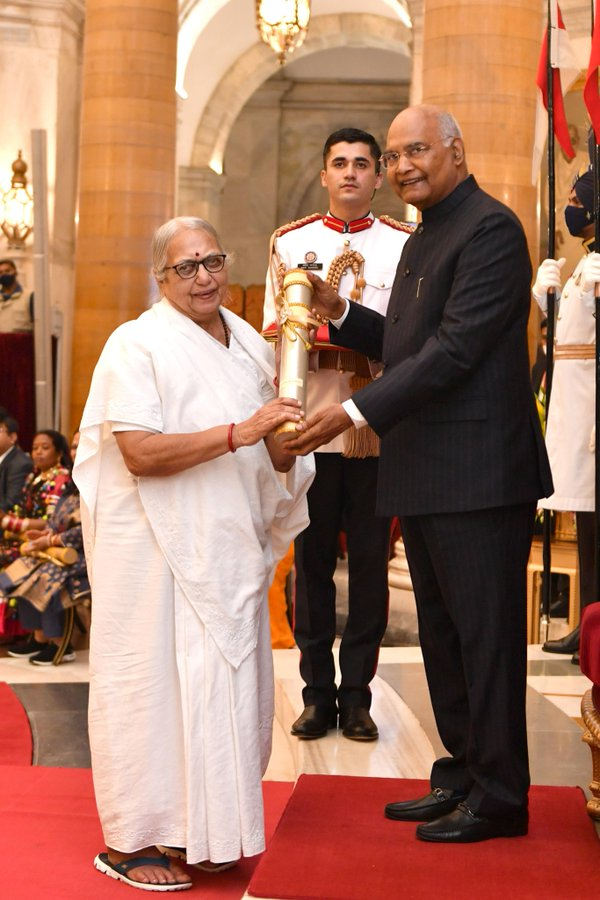
Kalarthi receives the Nari Shakti Puraskar, 2022

Niranjanaben Mukulbhai Kalarthi is an Indian author and educator. She was awarded the 2021 Nari Shakti Puraskar in 2022.

== Career ==
Writing in Gujarati language under the name Mukulbhai Kalarthi, Kalarthi published the books Ba ane Bapu about Gandhi and Gujaratna Shirchhatra Sardar about Vallabhbhai Patel.

Kalarthi is an administrator of the Swaraj Ashram at Bardoli and was present at the Bardoli Satyagraha. She is also a trustee of the Navajivan Trust which publishes the works of Gandhi. She has founded groups which promote the Gujarati language and for this was awarded the 2021 Nari Shakti Puraskar in 2022. She also received a National Teachers Award in 1989.
