= Dahyabhai Patel =

Indian politician

Member of Parliament, Rajya Sabha
- In office (1958-1964), (1964-1970), (1970 – 1973)
- Constituency: Bombay State
- Constituency: Gujarat

Mayor of Bombay
- In office 1954–1955
- Preceded by: P. A. Dias
- Succeeded by: N. C. Pupala

Personal details
- Born: 28 November 1905 Bombay Presidency
- Died: 11 August 1973 (aged 67) Bombay, Maharashtra, India
- Party: Swatantra Party (1958-1970)
- Other political affiliations: Indian National Congress (Before 1957)
- Children: 2
- Parents: Vallabhbhai Patel; Jhaverben Patel
- Relatives: Maniben Patel (sister); Vithalbhai Patel (uncle)

Dahyabhai Vallabhbhai Patel (28 November 1905 – 11 August 1973) was the son of Indian leader Sardar Vallabhbhai Patel and a member of the Parliament of India.

== Personal life ==
Educated at Bombay, Patel graduated from the Gujarat Vidyapith and began working for Oriental Insurance Company, and settled in Bombay. When he was 27, his first wife Yashoda died, leaving him his son Bipin. He later married Bhanumati and had another son, Gautam. His flat on Sandhurst Road and later Prabhadevi in Bombay was the frequent residence of Sardar Patel.

== Career ==
Patel was a Congressman and was elected member of the Brihanmumbai Municipal Corporation in 1939, where he spent 18 years. Patel participated in the Quit India movement and was imprisoned from 1942 to 1944.

He left congress in 1957 over disagreements with Prime Minister Jawaharlal Nehru. Patel requested to fight the 1957 Lok Sabha elections as a Parishad candidate, but decided against it on rebuke from his sister Maniben Patel. He eventually became the vice president of the Parishad and was elected to Rajya Sabha in 1958.
