= Mosali =

- Neighbourhood
- Country: India
- State: Gujarat
- District: Surat

Government
  - Body: Surat Municipal Corporation

Languages
  - Official: Gujarati, Hindi
- Time zone: UTC+5:30 (IST)
- PIN: 394421
- Telephone code: 91261-XXX-XXXX
- Vehicle registration: GJ
- Lok Sabha constituency: Bardoli
- Civic agency: Mosali Gram Panchyat
- Website: gujaratindia.com

Mosali is an area located in Surat, India. It has a post office with the pincode 394421.Mosali is important town of Mangrol Sub-District (Taluka).Main Market and All Government Offices is located in Mosali

== See also ==
- List of tourist attractions in Surat
