= Karamsad =

- Anand
- Location in Gujarat, India
- Coordinates: 22.543516°N 72.905746°E
- Country: India
- State: Gujarat

Government
  - Type: Municipal Corporation
  - Body: karamsad Anand Municipal Corporation
- Elevation: 35 m (115 ft)

Languages
  - Official: Gujarati, Hindi
- Time zone: UTC+5:30 (IST)

Sardar Vallabhbhai Patel, one of India's greatest leaders. in the Indian Independence Movement grew up in Karamsad. It was also the home of his elder brother Vithalbhai Patel, who was also an important political leader. The Patel brothers lived with their two elder brothers and one younger brother and sister, and parents Jhaverbhai and Ladba Patel in a mud-brick house adjacent to his family's farm holdings. This house is preserved to date as a memorial to Patel.

== History ==
The date of establishment of Karamsad is not exactly known, but during the era of Kumarpal i.e., in 1155 AD, the village consisted mainly of people from Koli tribes. This community mostly rely on agricultural skills.

In 1211, Aja Patel, originally from Hilod (a town near Adalaj), came over and settled here. Because of his skills, agricultural production increased and the village prospered.

The details henceforth from Aja Patel to Kupa Patel are not available, however, Kupa Patel was from the twelfth or fourteenth generation of Aja Patel. Kupa Patel was an ardent devotee of Lord Shiva. He renovated Lord Shiva's temple, which was in ruins and situated in the western side of the village and was later, well built by his son Lakha Patel. He had also helped build a lake in the village.

Devidas, a few generations down had two sons. Jibhai and Bajibhai. His sons asked the Moghul Governor of Ahmedabad Province to let them keep Karamsad for revenue collection. Of them, Majibhai's four sons and their descendants distributed themselves in six different Khadkis (street or lane before a group of two or more houses with a common gate) in Karamsad.

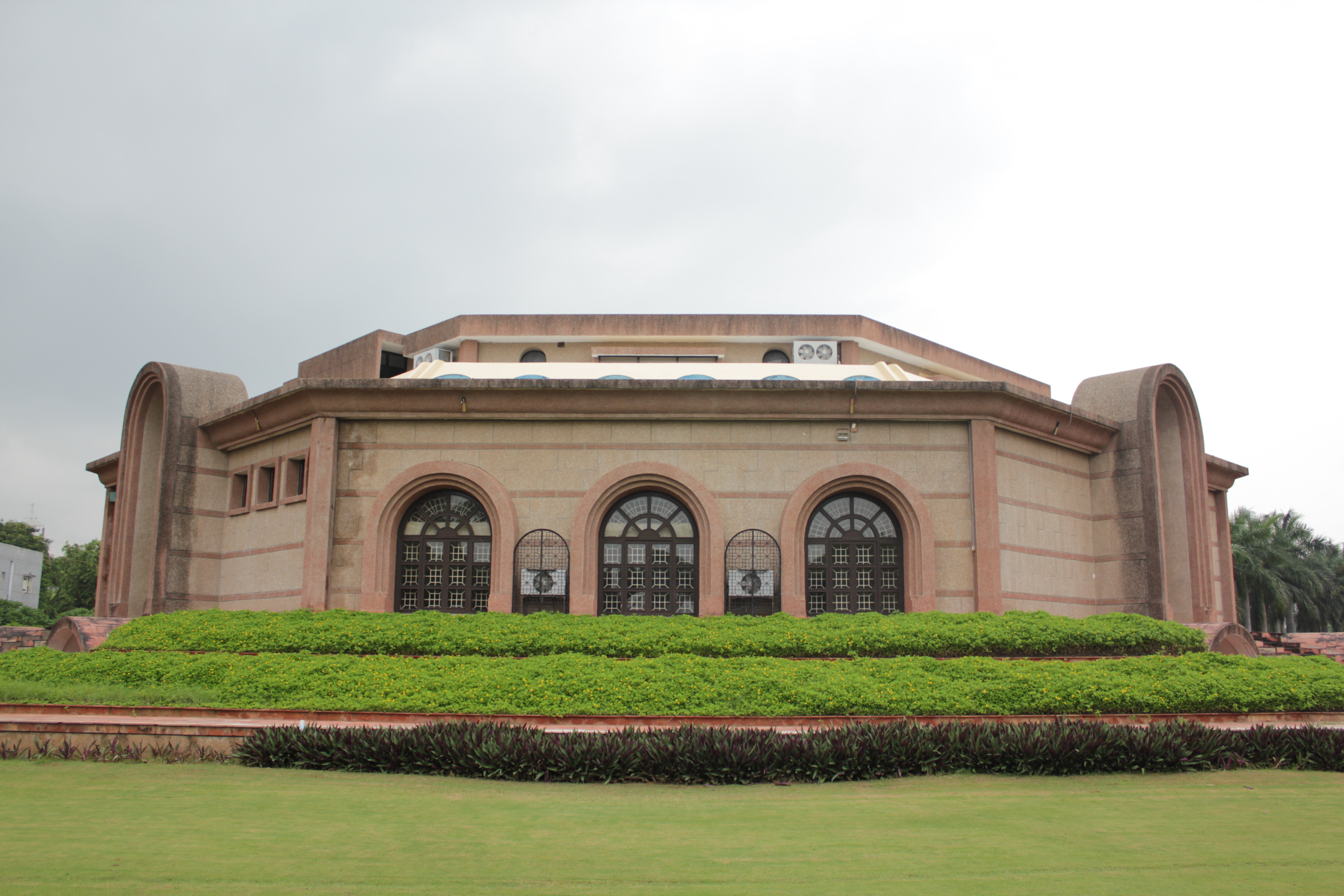
Sardar Patel Memorial at Karamsad

Six different Khadkis were formed in Karamsad after the six descendants of Mahijibhai.

1. Bhayni Khadki (Gokaldas)
2. Bapani Khadki (Govendas)
3. Hathibhaini Khadki (Sunderdas)
4. Motabhaini Khadki (Jivabhai)
5. Jini Khadki (Bhavijibhai)
6. Chhatthi Khadki (Laljibhai)

Another popular story goes like this - the original owner of the village was a Rajput. Mahijibhai Patel of the Uvarsad village, near Ahmedabad came and settled here. The Rajput community of the village did not like the arrival of Mahijibhai. They killed two of his six sons. Both of his brothers had actually gone to the Petlad court, where a case was filed against the Rajput community by Mahijibhai's sons. On their way back, they were killed by the Rajputs near Sandesar, where afterwards memorial pillars were built in their name. Today there are hardly any Rajputs in Karamsad. After the Patidars occupied most of the land in Karamsad, the Rajputs left and settled in Napa village.

The original Patidars of Karamsad were physically very strong. They were known for their endurance and their ability to bear torture. One of Mahijibhai's sons suffered from a carbuncle. (A carbuncle is when a particular part of the body becomes gangrenous). During that time, antibiotics were not available, so the only way to treat it was to cauterize that part. The local method at that time was by heating an iron rod and applying it over the affected part instantly. During this, the person would lose all his calm and nerves. At that time, this procedure would involve 3-4 people tightly holding the patient. One of the Rajput in Napa village was known to do this procedure. However that son was brave, so when Mahjibhai's son was taken over there he said, "Nobody should hold me. I do not need any support. Nothing is going to happen to me."

The Rajput performing this procedure had kept the old rivalry between them in mind. So he overheated the iron rod and put it over the affected part with great vengeance. Mahijibhai's son bore it without uttering a single word. When the Rajput praised him for his enduring power, Mahijibhai's son said, "Do not praise me. I am nothing in comparison to my other brothers. Their endurance power is a lot greater than mine."

After this incident, the Rajput community in Napa village came to know about the strength of the Patidar community and they stopped creating trouble in and around Karamsad. When Sardar Vallabhbhai Patel was staying at Nadiad, which was his maternal native, he had suffered from Bubo (an inflammatory swelling of a lymph gland) of the armpit. He had it cauterized without uttering a single word. After all he was also from Karamsad.

During the making of Vallabh Vidyanagar, had the Patidars of Karamsad not donated generously, then Vidyanagar would not have looked like what it looks today.

Karamsad has been quite under the influence of Swaminarayan Sect and Santram Temple for a long time. Both these sects do a lot of activities in Karamsad. Karamsad has always remained way ahead, be it in politics, education, religion, cooperative activities or industries in the Kheda District. The Patidars of Karamsad are well known in the social community of Chha Gam (six villages). The yesterday's generation of Patidars have proved best themselves in different fields in Africa, Fiji, Myanmar (Burma), etc. The first two Patidars to reach East Africa in 1895 AD. were, Maganbhai Naranbhai and Ishwarbhai Nathabhai Patel. Today the Patidars of Karamsad are spread out in England, Canada, America and Australia.

Santram Temple in Karamsad is famous for its Convention Hall / Banquet Hall. The temple also provides health services to the people at a very nominal charge. It also runs coaching classes for students. After being coached in these classes many students have been accepted into various engineering and medical colleges. A temple of Goddess Khodiyar – the presiding deity of Patidars has been recently built. It also has various facilities and a big banquet hall, which can be used for marriage ceremonies. There are very few Digambar Jain Temples in the whole of Gujarat, but still there is a temple (Derasar) in Karamsad. Moreover, there is a Swaminarayan Temple, Bapeshwar Mahadev, Catholic mission, and a mosque.

Karamsad is situated at 22 North latitude and 72 East longitude. It has a population of 14,000 people and has water works also, but in the past, people used to get water from Kharo Kuvo, Lakhvo Kuvo, Rabari No Kuvo, Moto Kuvo and other wells.

== Sardar Patel Biography ==
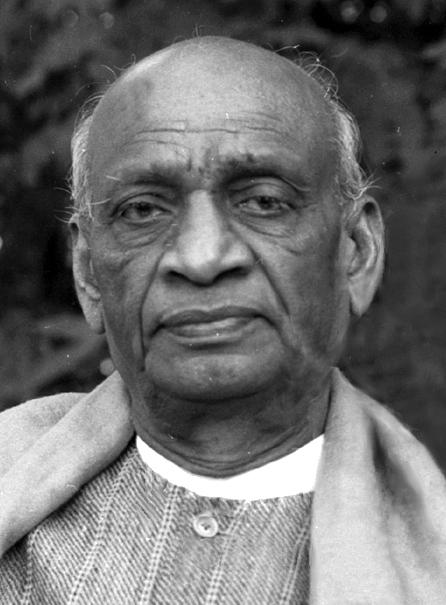
Sardar Vallabhbhai Patel

Sardar Patel belonged to a Patidar family of Gujarat. Sardar Vallabhbhai Patel was popularly known as Iron Man of India. His full name was Vallabhbhai Patel. He played a leading role in the Indian freedom struggle and became the first Deputy Prime Minister and Home Minister of India. He is credited with achieving political integration of India.

Patel was born on 31 October 1875 in Nadiad, a City in Gujarat. His father Jhaverbhai was a farmer and mother Laad Bai was a simple lady. Sardar Vallabhbhai's early education took place in Karamsad. Then he joined a school in Petlad. After two years he joined a high school in Nadiad. He passed his high school examination in 1896.

Vallabhbhai wanted to become a barrister. To realize this ambition he had to go to England. But he did not have the financial means to even join a college in India. In those days a candidate could study in private and sit for an examination in Law. Sardar Vallabh Bhai Patel borrowed books from a lawyer of his acquaintance and studied at home. Occasionally he attended courts of law and listened attentively to the arguments of lawyer. Vallabhbhai passed the Law examination.

Sardar Vallabhbhai Patel started his Law practice in Godhra. Soon his practice flourished. He married Jhaberaba. In 1904, he had a daughter, Maniben Patel, and in 1905 his son, Dahyabhai, was born. Vallabhbhai sent his elder brother Vitthalbhai, who himself was a lawyer, to England for higher studies in Law. Patel was only thirty-three years old when his wife died. He did not wish to marry again. After his brother's return, Vallabhbhai went to England. He studied with single-minded devotion and stood first in the Barrister-at-Law Examination.

Sardar Patel returned to India in 1913, and started his practice in Ahmedabad. Soon he became popular. At the urging of his friends, Patel contested and won elections to become the sanitation commissioner of Ahmedabad in 1917. Sardar Patel was deeply impressed by Gandhiji's success in Champaran Satyagraha. In 1918, there was a drought in the Kheda division of Gujarat. Peasants asked for relief from the high rate of taxes but the British government refused. Gandhiji took up peasants cause but could not devote his full-time to Kheda. He was looking for someone who could lead the struggle in his absence. At this point Sardar Patel volunteered to come forward and lead the struggle. He gave up his lucrative legal practice and entered public life.

Vallabhbhai successfully led a peasant revolt in Kheda and the revolt ended in 1919 when the British government agreed to suspend collection of revenue and roll back the rates. Kheda Satyagraha turned Vallabhbhai Patel into a national hero. Vallabhbhai supported Gandhi's Non-Cooperation Movement and, as president of the Gujarat Congress, helped in organizing bonfires of British goods in Ahmedabad. He gave up his English clothes and started wearing Khadi. Sardar Vallabh Bhai Patel was elected Ahmedabad's municipal president in 1922, 1924 and 1927. During his terms, Ahmedabad was extended a major supply of electricity and underwent major education reforms. Drainage and sanitation systems were extended over all the city.

In 1928, Bardoli Taluka in Gujarat suffered from famine. In this hour of distress the British government raised the revenue taxes by thirty percent. Sardar Patel took up cudgels on behalf of the farmers and appealed to the Governor to reduce the taxes. The Governor refused and the government even announced the date of the collection of the taxes. Sardar Patel organized the farmers and told them not to pay even a single pie of tax. The government tried to repress the revolt but ultimately bowed before Vallabhbhai Patel. It was during the struggle and after the victory in Bardoli that caused intense excitement across India, that Patel was increasingly addressed by his colleagues and followers as Sardar.

Sardar Patel was imprisoned during the Civil Disobedience Movement in 1930. After the signing of Gandhi-Irwin pact in 1931, Sardar Patel was released and he was elected Congress president for its 1931 session in Karachi. Upon the failure of the Round Table Conference in London, Gandhiji and Sardar Patel were arrested in January 1932 and imprisoned in the Yerwada Central Jail. During this term of imprisonment, Sardar Patel and Mahatma Gandhi grew close to one another, and the two developed a close bond of affection, trust, and frankness without reserve. Sardar Patel was finally released in July 1934.

In August 1942, the Congress launched the Quit India Movement. The government jailed all the important leaders of the Congress, including Vallabhbhai Patel. All the leaders were released after three years. After achieving independence on 15 August 1947, Pandit Jawaharlal Nehru became the first Prime Minister of independent India and Sardar Patel became the Deputy Prime Minister. He was in charge of Home Affairs, Information and Broadcasting and the Ministry of States.

There were 565 princely states in India at that time. Some of the Maharajas and Nawabs were dreaming of becoming independent rulers once the British quit India. They argued that the government of free India should treat them as equals. Some of them went to the extent of planning to send their representatives to the United Nations Organization.

Patel invoked the patriotism of India's monarchs, asking them to join in the freedom of their nation and act as responsible rulers who cared about the future of their people. He persuaded the princes of 565 states of the impossibility of independence from the Indian republic, especially in the presence of growing opposition from their subjects. With political foresight, he consolidated the small kingdoms. The entire nation was with him. He tackled the Nizam of Hyderabad and the Nawab of Junagarh who initially did not want to join India.

Sardar Patel's efforts brought success, uniting a scattered nation without much bloodshed. He was nicknamed 'Iron Man' . Sardar Patel died of cardiac arrest on 15 December 1950. For his services to the nation Sardar Patel was conferred with the Bharat Ratna posthumously in 1991.

== Geography ==
Karamsad is located at 22.55°N 72.9°E. It has an average elevation of 35 metres (114 feet).

== Demographics ==
As of 2001 India census, Karamsad had a population of 28,970. Males constitute 53% of the population and females 47%. Karamsad has an average literacy rate of 78%, higher than the national average of 59.5%: male literacy is 84%, and female literacy is 71%. In Karamsad, 10% of the population is under 6 years of age.

== Culture ==
Karamsad is the hometown of a large (& growing) number of non resident Indians (NRI's). Not only do they contribute to the development of the Charotar region, but they are also instrumental in creating & financing a lot of institutes.

Agriculture is also important to the local economy, and tobacco is the main crop that is grown in that area.

== Education ==
The area boasts of a large medical institute that is also a centre of undergraduate as well as postgraduate learning. The name is Pramukh Swami Medical In the heart of karamsad village the heritage educational campus is serving the society since more than hundred years. This campus has self finance as well granted schools.

(1) Sumant Jethabhai Patel kindergarten (pre-Primary Eng medium)

(2) Smt.C.J.Patel English Medium School (I to X)

(3)Smt.C.J.Patel Higher Secondary English Medium School

(4) Vir Vitthalbhai Patel High School (Pre Primary to 12th Std - Gujarati Medium)

(5) Sardar Patel High School

(6) N.R.Patel B.ed Collage
