= Sardar Vallabhbhai Patel National Memorial =

Sardar Patel National Memorial
- Moti Shahi Mahal
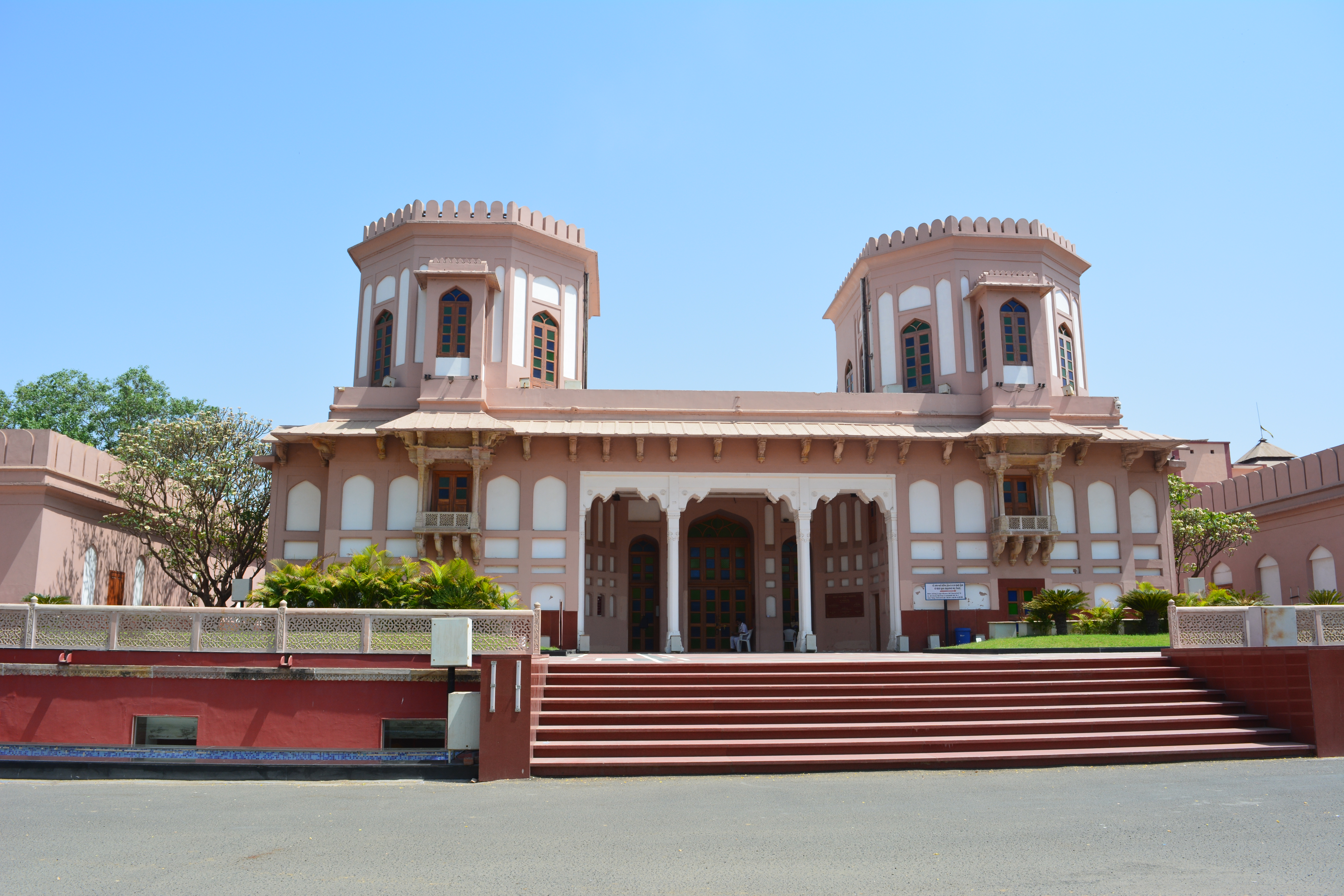
- Moti Shahi Mahal complex

- Location within Ahmedabad Location within Gujarat Location within India
- Established: 7 March 1980
- Location: Shahibag, Ahmedabad, Gujarat
- Coordinates: 23.061°N 72.591°E
- Type: Hall of Memory, Heritage centre
- Curator: Shahjahan
- Owner: Sardar Vallabhbhai Patel Memorial Society

Sardar Patel National Memorial

The Moti Shahi Mahal is a palace built by the Mughal emperor Shahjahan between 1616 and 1623, when he was still a prince. It hosts the Sardar Vallabhbhai Patel National Memorial, a museum and exhibition centre dedicated to Vallabhbhai Patel in Shahibaug, Ahmedabad, Gujarat, near Civil Hospital, Ahmedabad. It is surrounded by gardens.

== History ==
The palace and garden were built in the period 1616-1623 by prince and future Mughal emperor Shah Jahan, to serve as a residence for himself during his tenure as governor of Mughal Gujarat. The site earned the admiration of his father, emperor Jahangir, who commissioned a marble seat to be constructed in the garden. In the Mughal era, the site was known as Shahi Bagh (Princely Garden). The Shahibaug gardens of the palace were in the seventeenth century famous, the resort of the whole city, and one of its chief ornaments. A century and a half later (1781), though the well was in ruins and the fountains and water-courses broken, the gardens could still boast of some noble cypresses, cedars, palms, sandals, and cassias, with mango, tamarind, and other spreading fruit trees. Besides the gardens, there was, a little beyond, an older garden called the Andhari Badi, or dark garden, with large ruins. The palace, always kept in good repair, is thus described by Col. James Grant Forbes in 1781:

The saloon is spacious and lofty as the building; the walls are covered with a white stucco, polished like the finest marble, and the ceiling is painted in small compartments with much taste. The angular recesses lead to eight small octagon rooms, four below and as many above with separate stairs to each. They are finished in the same style as the saloon, the walls like alabaster and the ceiling embossed. The flat roof commands a wide view; the rooms under the saloon, and a surrounding platform ornamented with small canals and fountains, form a cool retreat.

At a little distance from the royal mansion, on the bank of the Sabarmati River, with separate gardens, baths and fountains, was the zanana or ladies' palace. In 1638 the Shahi Baug was very large, shut in by a great wall with ditches full of water, a beautiful house, and very rich rooms. In 1666 Thevenot found the King's garden filled with a variety of trees. The road lay through an avenue like those in Paris. The garden was very large or rather there were several gardens rising like an amphitheatre. There were four wonderful walks fringed, on either side right across the garden, by a terrace full of flowers and meeting in the form of a cross, where was a great building with a roof covered with green tiles.

The palace was later controlled by the British Raj when the Ahmedabad Cantonment was established in the mid-nineteenth century, and used for government purposes. To the original centre saloon, two large wings and several rooms and terraces were, about 1835, added by Mr. Williams, of the Civil Service. The apartments for the officers and attendants of the court were still further detached. In the great flood of 1875 the strong stone wall, which prevents the river from passing south towards the city, was slightly damaged, and sand was washed over it covering and destroying the garden beds.

Following Indian independence, this palace was the Raj Bhavan - an official residence of the governor of Gujarat, from 1960 to 1978. It was endowed by the Government of Gujarat in 1975, upon the centennial birth anniversary of Sardar Vallabhbhai Patel, to establish a memorial to honour him. The memorial was founded on 7 March 1980.

== Architecture ==
Moti Shahi Mahal is an example of Mughal architecture. According to historian James Douglas, it inspired Shahjahan to build the Taj Mahal later. Four pillars mark the four wings, one floor and the central hall of the palace.

== Memorials ==
=== Sardar Patel ===
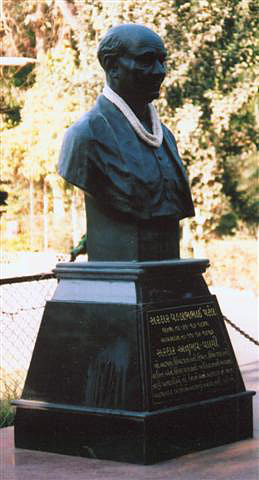
Statue of Patel outside the museum.

The Vallabhbhai Patel memorial is located on the ground floor, covering the central hall and four adjacent rooms..

=== Mahatma Gandhi ===
In a room connected through the Sardar Sarovar hall, the life and work of Mahatma Gandhi are on display..

=== Tagore ===
Rabindranath Tagore, Bengali poet, writer and philosopher stayed in the palace in 1878, when he was seventeen years old. He wrote his only ghost story, The Hungry Stones and his first song here.

On the first floor in the right wing of the palace, the room where Tagore lived is dedicated to his memory..

== Renovation ==
In 2012 the Government of India provided funding of the structure; subsequently the Gujarat High Court ordered a pause of the renovation work.
