= Sardar Patel Memorial Trust =

Indian organization

The Sardar Patel Memorial Trust is an organization dedicated to preserving the work and memory of Indian political leader Sardar Vallabhbhai Patel. It does a variety of work - publishing books and magazines on Patel's life and work, maintaining public displays and memorials, as well as hosting the annual Sardar Patel Memorial Lectures.

The Sardar Patel Memorial Lectures are organized by the Trust. It invites prominent Indians in the fields of politics, history, arts, law and journalism to speak on topics related to their expertise. Inspired and patterned on the BBC's Reith Lectures, they are delivered as broadcast talks on All India Radio.

== Bibliography ==
- Patel Memorial Lectures 1955-85. New Delhi: Publications Division, Ministry of Information and Broadcasting, 1990.
- Sardar Patel Lectures combined 1995-2002. New Delhi: Publications Division, Ministry of Information and Broadcasting, 2005.
