= Navajivan Trust =

Indian publishing house

Navajivan
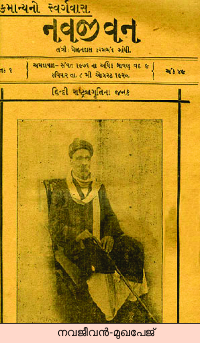
- Type: News paper
- Founded: 11 February 1933
- Language: Gujarati, Hindi
- Headquarters: Ahmedabad

Navajivan Trust is a publishing house based in Ahmedabad, India. It was founded by Mahatma Gandhi in 1929 and has published more than 800 titles in English, Gujarati, Hindi and other languages to date.

Earlier, Navajivan referred to a weekly newspaper published by Gandhi, in Gujarati, from 1919 (7 September) to 1931, from Ahmedabad.

== Objective ==
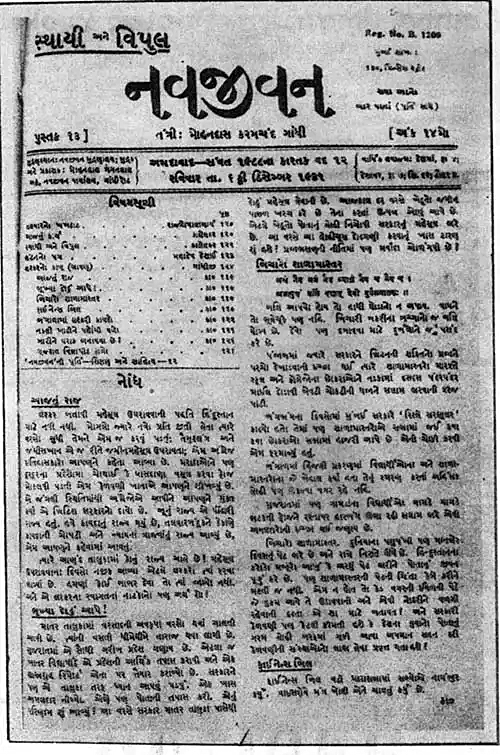
Page of Navjivan magazine dated 6 December 1931

The word Navajivan means "a new life" in Hindi, Gujarati and other Indo-Aryan languages.

As stated in its declaration at the time of its inception, the objective of Navajivan Trust was to propagate peaceful means for the attainment of Hind Swaraj (Swaraj for India) by educating the people through cultivated and enlightened workers and to serve India in this pure manner.

For the fulfilment of this object to conduct the Navajivan (to provide a new life), through it to carry on propaganda for peaceful attainment of Swaraj; and particularly:

- to propagate the spinning wheel and khadi;
- to propagate for the removal of untouchability;
- to propagate unity between the Hindus and the Mussalmans (Muslims) and the various communities who have settled in India;
- to present before the people constructive ways for protecting the cow by propagating for starting and managing tanneries, dairies and such other establishments;
- to propagate ways for the advancement of women such as:

1. Opposition to child marriage
2. Propagation of the idea of widow-remarriage in a restrained manner
3. Education for women;

- to break the unnatural glamour the English language has gained in the eyes of the people all over the country and to propagate for the establishment of Hindi or Hindustani in its place;
- to propagate by the publication of journals and books such other ways as would conduce to the religious, social, economic and political advancement of the people;
- not to take advertisements in the newspapers conducted by the Institution and in pamphlets, books etc. published by it; nor to accept in the printing press of the Institution such work for printing as-is against the aims and objects of the Institution;
- to publish a statement of the activities of the Institution and its accounts within three months after the end of the administrative year;
- always insist on carrying on all the activities of the Institution based on self-reliance.

Navajivan Trust was to propagate by the publication of journals and books the activities Gandhi had started for the religious, social, economic and political advancement of the people. It was to carry on all the activities based on self-reliance. For self-reliance, the press might undertake printing of such writings which are not contrary to the objectives of the Trust. It is to the credit of the devoted trustees of the Navajivan Trust that they have strictly observed the objectives of the Trust even at the cost of profitable printing work going past them. Similarly, no advertisement is taken in weeklies, papers or books published by the Trust. The objective of self-reliance has also been observed strictly as, so far, no grant or donation has been accepted by the Trust.
