= Vithalbhai Patel =

Indian politician (1873–1933)

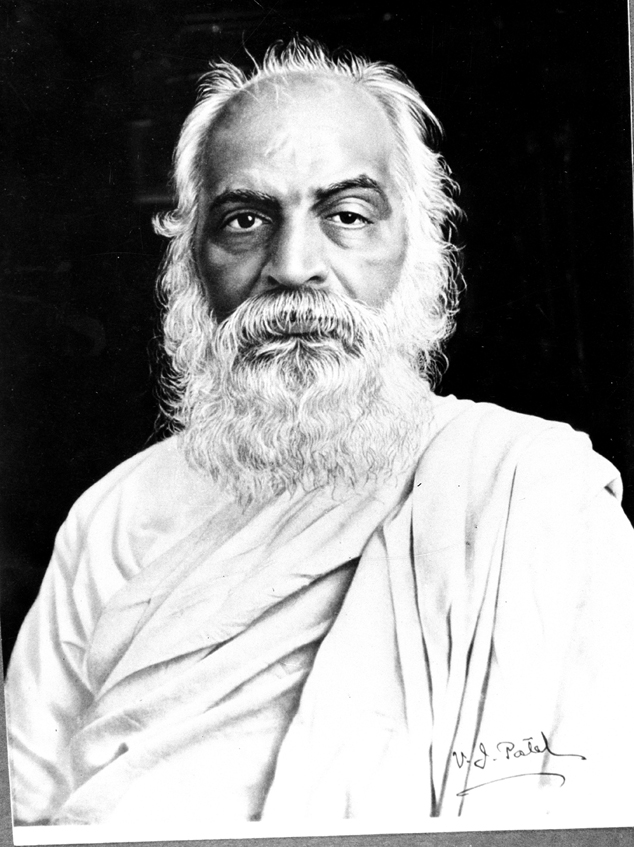
Vithalbhai Patel

Vithalbhai Patel (Gujarati: વિઠ્ઠલભાઈ પટેલ, 27 September 1873 – 22 October 1933) was an Indian legislator and political leader, co-founder of the Swaraj Party and elder brother of Sardar Patel.

== Early life ==
Born in Nadiad, in the Indian state of Gujarat, Vithalbhai Jhaverbhai Patel was the third of five Patel brothers, two years elder to Vallabhbhai Patel, raised in the village of Karamsad. According to Gordhanbhai Patel, a mistake on Vitalbhai's birthdate has crept into many modern accounts. His birthdate is clearly stated as 27 September 1873 on his last passport but the confusion arose from obituary notices after his death listing it incorrectly as 18 February 1871. Based on that, he is only two years elder to his younger brother Sardar Vallabhbhai Patel. He was son of Jhaverbhai and Ladbai Patel, who were both devout followers of the Swaminarayan sect of Vaisnava Hinduism, a sect which emphasizes the purity of personal life as essential to the life of devotion. The rare idealism the religion impressed on his parents likely had a significant impact on the minds of Vithalbhai and his renowned brother Vallabhai Patel. Vithalbhai educated himself in Nadiad and in Bombay, and worked as a pleader (a junior lawyer) in the courts of Godhra and Borsad. At the age of 9, he was married to a girl from another village, Diwaliba.

His younger brother, Vallabhbhai Patel, had similarly studied by himself and worked as a pleader. Studying in England was a dream for both men. Vallabhbhai had saved enough money and ordered his passport and travel tickets, when the postman delivered them to Vithalbhai, it having been addressed to a Mr. V.J. Patel, Pleader. Vithalbhai insisted on traveling on those documents actually meant for Vallabhbhai, pointing out that it would be socially criticized that an older brother followed the lead of the younger. Respecting his brother despite the obvious cruelty of fate on his own hard work, Vallabhbhai allowed Vithalbhai to proceed to England, and even paid for his stay. Vitthalbhai had to be sent to England secretly, as crossing the seas was taboo in their community.

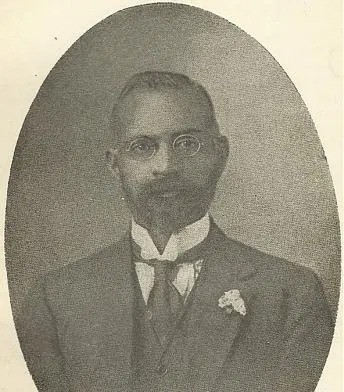
Vithalbhai as a barrister.

Vithalbhai entered the Middle Temple in London, and completed the 36-month course in 30, emerging at the top of his class. Returning to Gujarat in 1913, Vithalbhai became an important barrister in the courts of Bombay and Ahmedabad. However, his wife died in 1915, and he remained a widower.

== Political career ==
Although never truly accepting the philosophy and leadership of Mahatma Gandhi, Patel joined the Congress and the struggle for freedom. He had no regional base of support, yet he was an influential leader who expanded the struggle through fiery speeches and articles published. When Mahatma Gandhi aborted the struggle in 1922 following the Chauri Chaura incident, Patel left the Congress to form the Swaraj Party with Chittaranjan Das and Motilal Nehru, which would seek to foil the Raj by sabotaging the government after gaining entry in the councils. The Swaraj Party became the largest single party in the Central Legislature, and in most provincial legislative assemblies. Vithalbhai Patel himself was elected President (the equivalent of Speaker) of India's Central Legislative Assembly, and helped put in place many legislative procedures that still exist today. Patel and others were important voices who rebelled against the leadership of Gandhi when the nation anguished over the abortion of the Non-Cooperation Movement

Patel grew popular and respected by his oratorical and witty mastery and belittling of the Raj's officials, winning many a battle of wit. In 1914, Vithalbhai played a prominent role in two bills on the Bombay provincial legislative council, "the Bombay District Municipal Act Amendment Bill" and "The Town Planning Bill" in 1914. His most well known proposal for which he received praise was for the extension of primary education to municipal districts in the Bombay presidency outside of the city of Bombay in 1917. After a long battle, the bill was passed after several amendments and modifications. Throughout his time on the legislative council, he passed and fought for several bills and amendments on medical practice. In a 1912 amendment to the Bombay medical act, he sought to register doctors for disciplinary action for malpractice. This amendment did not include ayurvedic physicians. In 1924 he was elected to the Central Legislative Assembly, a chamber of elected and appointed Indian and British representatives with limited legislative powers, and in 1925 became the Assembly's President (Speaker), becoming the first elected President (Speaker) and also the first Indian in that position, after the retirement of Sir Frederick Whyte.

As the President of the Assembly, Patel laid down the practices and procedures for the business of the Assembly. In 1928, he created a separate office for the Assembly, independent of the administration of the Government of India. He established the convention of neutrality of the President in debates, except to use a casting vote in favour of the status quo.

== Last years ==
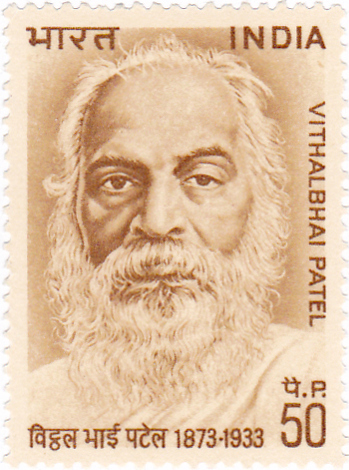
Patel on a 1973 stamp of India

In his later years, Vithalbhai travelled in the United States and Europe. The mayors of cities such as New York, Boston, Detroit, Chicago, and San Francisco officially received him. He was also welcomed officially by the Governors of Pennsylvania and Maryland. He also addressed each of the two houses of California's legislature for half an hour.

While Vithalbhai was in London, the relationship between the British Empire and Ireland began to deteriorate. Eamon De Valera came into power and refused to pay land annuities. The British cabinet was interested in devising ways to protect Ireland from slipping out of British hands. De Valera wanted Vithalbhai to act as an arbitrator between the British Empire and Ireland in the dispute on the Irish Question.

Patel's health worsened in Europe. As his last political act, Patel signed a statement written by Bose which called for a militant form of non-cooperation and "radical re-organisation of Congress". He added that a change in leadership of Congress is necessary because it would be "unfair" to expect Mahatma Gandhi to bring a change contrary to his "life-long principles".

On his deathbed he left a will of sorts, bequeathing three-quarters of his money to Bose to use in promoting India’s cause in other countries. When Vallabhbhai Patel saw a copy of the letter in which his brother had left a majority of his estate to Bose, he asked a series of questions: Why was the letter not attested by a doctor? Had the original paper been preserved? Why were the witnesses to that letter all men from Bengal and none of the many other veteran freedom activists and supporters of the Congress who had been present at Geneva where Vithalbhai had died? Patel may even have doubted the veracity of the signature on the document. The case went to court and after a legal battle that lasted more than a year, the courts judged that Vithalbhai’s estate could only be inherited by his legal heirs, that is, his family. Patel promptly handed the money over to the Vithalbhai Memorial Trust.

Vitthalbhai died in Geneva, Switzerland, on 22 October 1933. His body was embalmbed in Geneva and transported to Bombay on SS Narkunda and was cremated in Bombay on 10 November in front of a crowd of over 3 lakh people.

== Cited sources ==
- Patel, Gordhanbhai (1950). Vithalbhai Patel Life and Times. Bombay: R.A. Moramkar. p. 3.
