= Bardoli =

- City
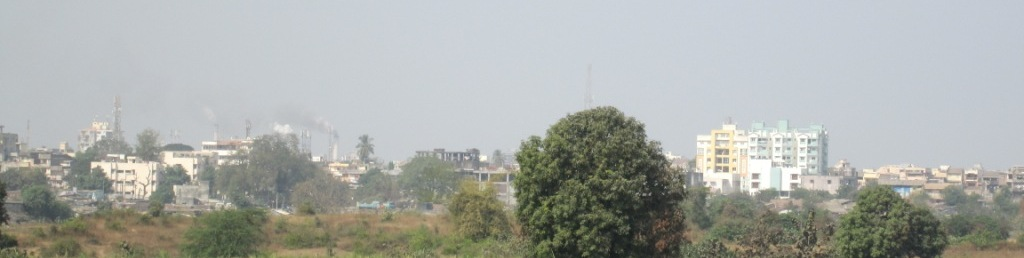

- Location in Gujarat, India Bardoli (India)
- Coordinates: 21.12°N 73.12°E
- Country: India
- State: Gujarat
- District: Surat

Area
  - Total: 46 km^{2} (18 sq mi)
- Elevation: 22 m (72 ft)

Population (2012)
  - Total: 475,963
  - Density: 10,000/km^{2} (27,000/sq mi)

Languages
  - Official: Gujarati
- Time zone: UTC+5:30 (IST)
- PIN: 394601/02
- Telephone code: 02622
- Vehicle registration: GJ-19
- Sex ratio: 1000:1000 ♂/♀
- Website: www.bardolinagarpalika.org

Bardoli (Gujarati: બારડોલી; Hindi: बारडोली) is a town and a municipality in the Surat Metropolitan Region. Situated in Southern Gujarat on the banks of the Mindhola River in Western India, it is located approximately 35 km east of Surat proper.

== Geography ==
Bardoli is located at 21.12°N 73.12°E. It has an average elevation of 22 metres (72 feet).

== Weather ==
Bardoli is having average rainfall of 1512 mm for the last 30 years (I.e., 1995–2024). Bardoli has received 864 mm, 876 mm, 934 mm, 1504 mm, 1567 mm, 2089 mm, 1585 mm 2017 mm, 1811 mm, and 2231 mm during the years 2015, 2016, 2017, 2018, 2019, 2020, 2021, 2022, 2023, and 2024 respectively. http://www.gsdma.org/rainfalldata-2?Type=2. January is with temperature in the range of an average low of 18.6 °C (65.5 °F) and an average high of 31 °C (87.8 °F). February is with an average temperature fluctuating between 20.3 °C (68.5 °F) and 33.4 °C (92.1 °F). March is with an average temperature ranging between min 23.2 °C (73.8 °F) and max 36.4 °C (97.5 °F). April is with an average temperature between 25.8 °C (78.4 °F) and 38.5 °C (101.3 °F). May is with an average temperature between 27.6 °C (81.7 °F) and 38.2 °C (100.8 °F). June is the first month of the rainy (monsoon) season is with an average temperature between an average low of 28 °C (82.4 °F) and an average high of 34.7 °C (94.5 °F). July is with an average temperature varying between 26.2 °C (79.2 °F) and 30.5 °C (86.9 °F). August is with average temperature fluctuating between 25.2 °C (77.4 °F) and 29.5 °C (85.1 °F). September is with an average temperature ranging between min 24.3 °C (75.7 °F) and max 30.8 °C (87.4 °F). October is with temperature in the range of an average low of 24 °C (75.2 °F) and an average high of 34.3 °C (93.7 °F). In October, the average high temperature slightly increases November is with temperature in the range of an average high of 33.8 °C (92.8 °F) and an average low of 22.2 °C (72 °F). December, the first month of the winter, is fluctuating between 19.4 °C (66.9 °F) and 31.8 °C (89.2 °F).

== Hazira-Bardoli Expressway ==
Bardoli is located 35 km from Surat. Although owing to the traffic conditions that previously took an hour or so to reach Surat, the new Hazira-Bardoli Expressway reduces the commuting time to just 30 minutes.

== Bardoli Satyagrah ==
Bardoli taluka was selected to launch the civil disobedience campaign in 1922 but the event was later called off due to events in Chauri Chaura. The Bardoli Satyagraha movement was started in January 1928 after the land revenue in Bardoli taluka was increased by 30 percent. In February 1928, Sardar Vallabhbhai Patel was called to lead the movement. It was Bardoli satyagraha where Vallabhbhai Patel got the title "Sardar" by women. Patel set up 13 worker's camps in Bardoli to organize the movement.

== Demographics ==
As of 2001 India census, The Bardoli Municipality has population of 51,963 of which 26,701 are males while 25,262 are females. Literacy rate of Bardoli city is 86.78% higher than state average of 78.03%. In Bardoli, male literacy is around 89.97% while female literacy rate is 83.47%.

== Education ==
There is such Government colleges P.R.B.Arts and P.G.R.Commerce college and The Patidar Gin Science College in bardoli tehsil. A government Kumar and Kanya schools are situated in bardoli town and with tehsil few village have gov ITI colleges . There are several private schools for primary and secondary education. The city has major four college campuses. Out of those four one is solely a private campus under Uka Tarsadia University (UTU) and others are affiliated with Gujarat Technical University (GTU) and Veer Narmad South Gujarat University (VNSGU). All the college campuses in the area are well facilitated with facilities like hostel, recreation, mess, etc. It's also a major destination for students of South Gujarat who are willing to get admission to a private university.

Famous Hotel Tycoon and Philanthropist BU Patel, founder of Tarsadia Hotel has roots to Bardoli.

== See also ==
- List of tourist attractions in Surat
