= Desai =

Indian title

Desai (pronounced [d̪eːsaːi]) is an Indian administrative, princely or honorary title and surname.

== Etymology ==
The word is derived from the Sanskrit deśa (country) and svāmī (lord).

== Desai as a title ==
Desai was a title given to lords, and others who were granted a village or group of villages in Maharashtra, and North Karnataka. The title Desai should not be associated with a particular religion or caste, though a Desai would use the title of Rao or Rai or Raje as a suffix to his name denoting he is a king of those villages, The "Desai" title was given by Maratha emperors, Mughal emperors and by the Deccan sultanates.

- In Maharashtra, the title Desai is conferred to feudal lords and village council members. Most of them are either Gaud Saraswat Brahmins, Deshastha Brahmins, Karhade Brahmins, Prabhus (CKP- Davane Prabhus and Pathare Prabhus), Lingayats, Patidars and Marathas.
- Desais were the rulers of Kudal (Sindhudurg) in Maharashtra.
- Desai, or a loftier compound, was a rare title for rulers of a few princely states, notably - Raja Sar Desai in the Maratha Savantvadi State from 1627 until the adoption of "Raja Bahadur" in 1763.
- Desai Shri in Patdi (the former Viramgam State), in Eastern Kathiawar, where Desai was also the name of the ruling family, which belongs to the Desai clan of Kadwa Patidar.
- In Gujarat, Desai is honoured to Anavil Brahmin, Khedaval Brahimins, Vaishnav Vanik and Rabari and Patidars caste people. The title was also given to feudal lords and revenue collectors

== Desai as a surname ==
Desai as a surname is used by Gaud Saraswat Brahmin, Deshastha Brahmin, Karhade Brahmin, Marathas, Chandraseniya Kayastha Prabhu, Pathare Prabhu, Panchkalshi, Anavil Brahmin, Khedaval Brahmin, Rabari, Leva Patel, Patidar, and Jain communities of Karnataka, Maharashtra, Gujarat and Lingayat communities of Karnataka.

== People with the surname ==
Notable people with the surname Desai include:

=== Public officers ===
- Gopaldas Ambaidas Desai – politician; former Prince of Dhasa
- Babubhai Desai – Ex MLA of kankrej
- Kantilal Thakoredas Desai – second Chief Justice of Gujarat
- Kevit Desai – Permanent Secretary, Ministry of Education state department for Vocational and Technical Training, Kenya
- Krishna Desai – CPI politician
- Morarji Desai – Prime Minister of India (1977–79)
- Mahadev Desai – Secretary to Mahatma Gandhi
- S. T. Desai – first Chief Justice of Gujarat
- Haridas Viharidas Desai – Diwan of Junagadh state (1883–95)
- Prakash K. Desai – Air Marshal of Indian Air Force

=== Arts, sciences and business ===
- Anita Desai – Author; mother of author Kiran Desai
- Bhairavi Desai – American labor union leader
- Bindu Desai – Actress
- C. D. Desai – Banker and philatelist
- Ebrahim Desai – Islamic scholar
- Kiran Desai – Author; 2006 Man Booker Prize winner
- Kishwar Desai – Author
- Manmohan Desai – Director
- Mavjibhai Desai – Vice Chairman of Banas Dairy
- Meghnad Desai, Baron Desai – economist
- Mihir A. Desai – American economist and professor at Harvard Business School and Harvard Law School
- Nishtha Desai – Scholar and children's rights activist
- Nitin Chandrakant Desai – Art director
- Padma Desai – American economist and professor at Columbia University
- Ramanlal Desai – Gujarati writer
- Ranjit Desai – Marathi writer
- Salil Desai – Author
- Sapan Desai – American physician; publisher and discredited researcher
- Umedram Lalbhai Desai – Physician
- Jhinabhai Desai – Gujarati poet and author better known by his pen name Snehrashmi, educator, political leader and Indian independence activist
- Usha Desai – Medical doctor and environmentalist
- Prasannavadan Bhagwanji Desai – Demographer, economist and Indian independence activist
- K. B. Desai – Medical doctor, Indian independence activist and political leader
- Roopali Desai – American federal judge

=== Culture and sports ===
- Anang Desai - Indian actor
- Anoop Desai – American singer
- Gunwant Desai – Indian cricketer
- K. R. Desai – Cricketer; philanthropist; educator
- Prachi Desai – Actress
- Ramakant Desai – Cricketer; India's first fast bowler
- Rashami Desai – Actress
- Ravish Desai – Actor
- Renu Desai – Actress
- Satyaki "Sattu" Desai – Environmental officer
- Sean Desai – American football coach; Defensive Coordinator for the Chicago Bears
- Subhash Desai – Shiv Sena leader
- Tina Desai – Actress
- Rajdeep Sardesai – News anchor

== See also ==
- Maratha titles
- Indian honorifics
- Indian feudalism
