= Kunbi (disambiguation) =

Kunbi is a community in Maharashtra, India.

- Gauda and Kunbi, a people of Goa, India
- Kudumbi, a Konkani people of Kerala, India

== See also ==
- Patidar, also known as Kanbi, a caste of Gujarat, India
