= Kheda Satyagraha of 1918 =

Civil resistance movement organized by Gandhi in India

Kheda Satyagraha
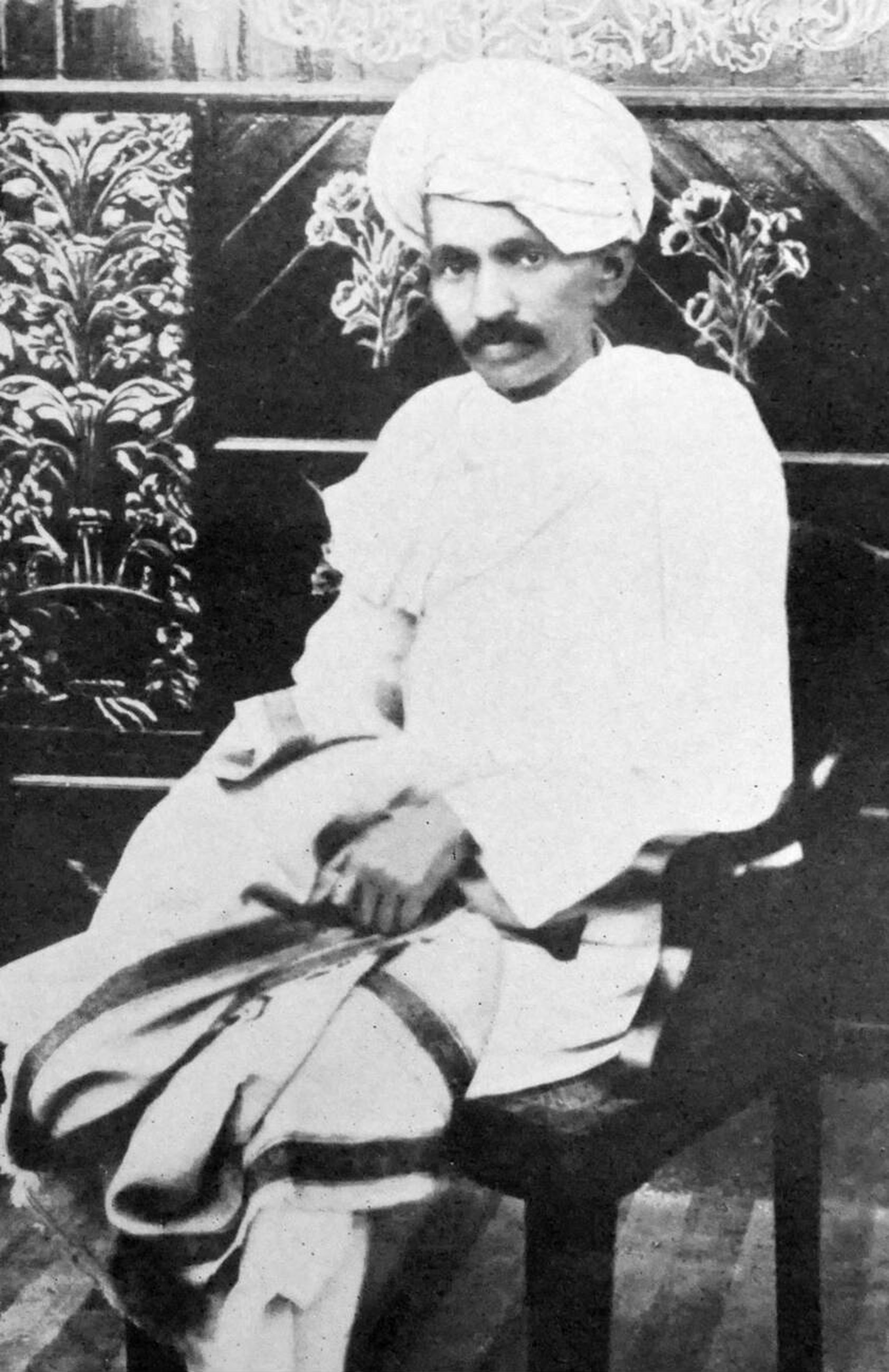
- Mahatma Gandhi in 1918, when he led the Kheda Satyagraha
- English name: Khaira movement
- Date: 22 March — 5 June 1918
- Location: Kheda district, Gujarat, India
- Organised by: Sardar Vallabhbhai Patel, Mahatma Gandhi, Indulal Yagnik, Shankarlal Banker, Mahadev Desai, Narhari Parikh, Mohanlal Pandya and Ravi Shankar Vyas

The Kheda Satyagraha of 1918 was a satyagraha movement in the Kheda district of Gujarat in India organised by Mahatma Gandhi during the period of the British Raj. It was a major revolt in the Indian independence movement. It was the second Satyagraha movement, which was launched 7 days after the Ahmedabad mill strike. After the successful Satyagraha conducted at Champaran in Bihar, Gandhi organised the movement to support peasants who were unable to pay the revenue because of famine and plague epidemic.

== Leaders ==
In Gujarat, Mahatma Gandhi was chiefly the spiritual head of the struggle. He was assisted by the newly joined Satyagraha Sardar Vallabhbhai Patel and other local lawyers and advocates namely Indulal Yagnik, Shankarlal Banker, Mahadev Desai, Narhari Parikh, Mohanlal Pandya and Ravi Shankar Vyas. They toured the countryside, organised the villagers and gave them political leadership and direction.

== The struggle ==
In 1917, due to excess rain and high rat infestation, the agricultural output of the Kheda region produced was more than four sixteenths worse than expectations. According to the law, any region that produced four sixteenths less crops than normal would have their land revenue tax waived for the year. Accordingly, the Patidars of the region along with Mohanlal Pandya and Shankarlal Banker requested the attention of Vallabhbhai Patel, Vitthalbhai Patel to get the land revenue waived. While the Kheda district collector promised to waive the tax and ordered it so, other government officials pressured the talatis to have the accounts written such that the agricultural output was shown to be four sixteenths more. Despite receiving orders, mamlatdars still sought to collect the tax.

The Gujarat Sabha issued petitions to British officials all the way up to the Governor of Bombay, but the revenue officials remained obstinate in their decision to collect the land revenue. In result, Mahatma Gandhi and Vallabhbhai Patel arrived in Kheda district and established a panchayat samiti and in March 1918, the decision was made to do a satyagraha. Leaders like Anasuya Sarabhai, Indulal Yagnik, and Mahadev Desai prepared the farmers of Kheda district to refuse to pay the tax and be ready to endure punishment with a calm demeanor.

The government remained civil at first but began taking harsh measures against the farmers. The government seized working animals, cooking vessels and utensils, household goods, and for some villages the entire agricultural output was confiscated. The cultivators began to feel defeated; to raise their spirits Mohanlal Pandya and his associates harvested onions from a government-confiscated field, earning him the sobriquet "Onion Thief" and boosting the morale of the farmers.

Gandhi had requested the commissioner to allow richer farmers to pay the land revenue of the poor ones, but was refused. On 3 June 1918, Gandhi was in Uttarsanda whose mamlatdar told Gandhi that he would accept if wealthier cultivators paid the land revenue of the poor ones, but that he could only make that decision for the Uttarsanda taluka and the Kheda district collector could decide for the entire district. Eventually those very terms were agreed to by the collector.

== Impact ==
The Kheda satyagraha had the impact of rousing the national sentiment of Gujarat's cultivators as well as establishing connections between the Gujarati educated and national volunteer class and the agriculturalists.

== See also ==
- Champaran Satyagraha
- Gandhism
- Indian Independence Movement, Indian Nationalism
- My Autobiography, Or The Story Of My Experiments With Truth (1929) by M.K. Gandhi
- Mohandas Gandhi
- Non-co-operation movement
- Sardar Vallabhbhai Patel
- Satyagrah
