= Kunbi =

Farmer castes in Western India

A group of Kunbis in Central India, 1916

Kunbi (alternatively Kanbi) (Marathi: ISO 15919: Kuṇabī, Gujarati: ISO 15919: Kaṇabī) is a generic term applied to several castes of traditional farmers in Western India. These include the Dhonoje, Ghatole, Khedule, Khaire, Tirole, Masaram, Hindre, Jadav, Jhare, Lewa (Leva Patil), Lonari, Tirole and Khaire communities of Vidarbha. The communities are largely found in the state of Maharashtra but also exist in the states of Madhya Pradesh, Gujarat (now called Patidar), Karnataka, Kerala and Goa. Kunbis are included among the Other Backward Classes (OBC) in Maharashtra. (Note: In Hinduism, communities are divided into four main social classes, also known as Varna in Sanskrit. Each class is further sub-divided into a multitude of castes. The term 'Caste Hindu' is used to refer to these four main classes. The Dalits (also known as Mahars and Harijans) were traditionally outside of caste system and can now be said to form a fifth group of castes. The first three Varnas in the hierarchy are said to be dvija (twice-born). They are called twice born on account of their education and these three castes are allowed to wear the sacred thread. These three castes are called the Brahmins, the Kshatriyas and the Vaishyas. The traditional caste-based occupations are priesthood for the Brahmins, ruler or warrior for the Kshatriyas and businessman or farmer for the Vaishyas. The fourth caste is called the Shudras and their traditional occupation is that of a labourer or a servant. While this is the general scheme all over India, it is difficult to fit all modern facts into it. These traditional social and religious divisions in the caste system have lost their significance for many contemporary Indians except for marriage alliances. The traditional pre-British, and pre-modern, Indian society, while stationary, afforded very limited caste mobility to those from non-elite castes who could successfully wage warfare against (and seize power from) a weak ruler, or bring wooded areas under the plough to establish independent kingdoms. According to M. N. Srinivas, "Political fluidity in pre-British India was in the last analysis the product of a pre-modern technology and institutional system. Large kingdoms could not be ruled effectively in the absence railways, post and telegraph, paper and printing, good roads, and modern arms and techniques of warfare.".) (Note: The Indian Constitution of 26 January 1950 outlawed untouchability and caste discrimination. The constitution gives generous privileges to the backward castes in an effort to redress injustice over the ages.)

Most of the Mavalas serving in the armies of the Maratha Empire under Shivaji came from this community. The Shinde and Gaekwad dynasties of the Maratha Empire are originally of Kunbi origin. In the fourteenth century and later, several Kunbis who had taken up employment as military men in the armies of various rulers underwent a process of Sanskritisation and began to identify themselves as Marathas. The boundary between the Marathas and the Kunbi became obscure in the early 20th century due to the effects of colonisation, and the two groups came to form one block, the Maratha-Kunbi.

Tensions along caste lines between the Kunbi and the Dalit communities were seen in the 2006 Khairlanji killings of four Scheduled Caste citizens by fellow villagers of Khairlanji, and the media have reported sporadic instances of violence against Dalits. Other inter-caste issues include the forgery of caste certificates by politicians, mostly in the grey Kunbi-Maratha caste area, to allow them to run for elections from wards reserved for OBC candidates. In April 2005, the Supreme Court of India ruled that the Marathas are not a sub-caste of Kunbis.

Maharashtra's Kunbi community shares links with North and Eastern India's Kurmi and Kudmi Mahato and Kudumbi in South India. Both are farming communities. Both communities have deep roots in agriculture, with "Kunbi" itself meaning "farmer" in Marathi. The Indian government in 2006 recognized them as synonymous and NCBC issued notification that the 'Kurmi' caste / community of Maharashtra is akin to the Kunbis of Maharashtra and is socially and educationally backward.

== Etymology ==
According to the Anthropological Survey of India, the term Kunbi is derived from kun and bi meaning "people" and "seeds", respectively. Conjoined, the two terms mean "those who germinate more seeds from one seed". Another etymology states that Kunbi is believed to have come from the Marathi word kunbawa, or Sanskrit kur, meaning "agricultural tillage". Yet another etymology states that Kunbi derives from kutumba ("family"), or from the Dravidian kul, "husbandman" or "cultivator". Thus anyone who took up the occupation of a cultivator could be brought under the generic term Kunbi. G. S. Ghurye has posited that while the term may "signify the occupation of the group, viz., that of cultivation ... it is not improbable that the name may be of tribal origin."

== Marriages ==
Like other Maharashtrian communities such as Marathas, Dhangars Malis etc., the marriage of a man to his maternal uncle's daughter is common in the Kunbi community. Maratha and Kunbis intermarried in a hypergamous way i.e. a rich Kunbi's daughter could always marry a poor Maratha. Anthropologist Donald Attwood shows giving an example of the Karekars of Ahmednagar that this trend continues even in recent times indicating that the social order between the two is fluid and flexible.

== Maratha-Kunbi ==
Very little information was recorded prior to the 19th century regarding the significantly large group of Maharashtrian agricultural castes, known as Maratha-Kunbis. Both individual terms, Kunbi and Maratha are equally complex. In the fourteenth century, the term Maratha (among other meanings) referred to all speakers of the Marathi language. An example of this is the record of the Moroccan traveler Ibn Battuta whose use of the term included multiple castes who spoke Marathi. Several years later, as the Bahamani kings started employing the local population in their military, the term Maratha acquired a martial connotation. Those who were not associated with the term Maratha and were not untouchables began to identify themselves as Kunbi. According to Stewart Gordon, the so-called Marathas now differentiated themselves from the others such as the cultivators (Kunbi), iron-workers and tailors. At lower status levels, the term Kunbi was applied to those who tilled the land. It was possible for outsiders to become Kunbi, an example of which was recorded by Enthoven. Enthoven observed that it was common for Kolis (fishermen) to take up agriculture and become Kunbis. In the eighteenth century, under the Peshwas, newer waves of villagers joined the armies of the Maratha Empire. These men began to see themselves as Marathas too, further obscuring the boundary between the Marathas and Kunbi, giving rise to a new category: Maratha-Kunbi. While this view of the term was common among colonial European observers of the eighteenth century, they were ignorant of the caste connotations of the term. The dividing line between the Maratha and Kunbi was obscure, but there was evidence of certain families who called themselves Assall Marathas or true Marathas. (Note: This self-identified group claimed to comprise 96 clans. They attempted to link themselves to the four Kshatriya lineages: Solar, Lunar, Brahma and Shesh via the Rajputs of north India. However, the list of 96 clans is highly controversial and there seems to be no consensus concerning who is included or excluded.) The Assal Marathas claimed to be Kshatriyas in the Varna hierarchy and claimed lineage from the Rajput clans of north India. The rest, the Kunbi, accepted that they came lower in the Varna hierarchy. Karve says that the Maratha caste precipitated from the Kunbi through the Sanskritisation process, the two were later consolidated due to social reforms as well as political and economic development during British rule in the early 20th century.

The British installed Chatrapati Pratapsinh Bhonsle, a descendant of Shivaji, noted in his diary in the 1820s–1830s that the Gaekwads (another powerful Maratha dynasty) had Kunbi origins. He notes further "These days, when the Kunbis and others grow wealthy, they try to pollute our caste. If this goes on, dharma itself will not remain. Each man should stick to his own caste, but in spite of this these men are trying to spread money around in our caste. But make no mistake, all Kshatriyas will look to protect their caste in this matter." Later, in September 1965, the Marathi Dnyan Prasarak newspaper published a piece which addressed the changing meaning of the term Maratha, the social mobility of the day, the origins of the Maratha-Kunbi castes, the eating habits and the living conditions of the people of Maharashtra. The author of the piece claims that only a very small circle of families, like those of Shivaji Bhonsale, can claim the Kshatriya status. He also states that these Kshatriya families have not been able to stop the inroads made by the wealthy and powerful Kunbis, who had bought their way into Kshatriya status through wealth and inter-marriages. Of the most powerful Maratha dynasties, the Shindes (later anglicised to Scindia) were of Kunbi origin. (Note: The current heir in the line of the Shindes is Jyotiraditya Scindia, a member of the Indian parliament.) A "Marathaisation" of the Kunbis was seen between the censuses of 1901 and 1931, which shows a gradually declining number of Kunbis resulting from more of them identifying themselves as Marathas. Lele notes in 1990 that a subset of the Maratha-Kunbi group of castes became the political elite in the state of Maharashtra in the 1960s and 1970s and have remained so to the present day. The elite Maratha-Kunbis have institutionalised their ideology of agrarian development through their control of the Congress party. The state Government of Maharashtra does not recognise a group called Maratha-Kunbi.

According to Irawati Karve, the Marata-Kunbi form over 40% of the population of Western Maharashtra. Later in 1990, Lele records that the Maratha-Kunbi group of castes account for 31% of the population, distributed over the whole of Maharashtra.

== Kunbi communities from Vidarbha region of Maharashtra ==
Kunbis carrying out the dead, 1916.

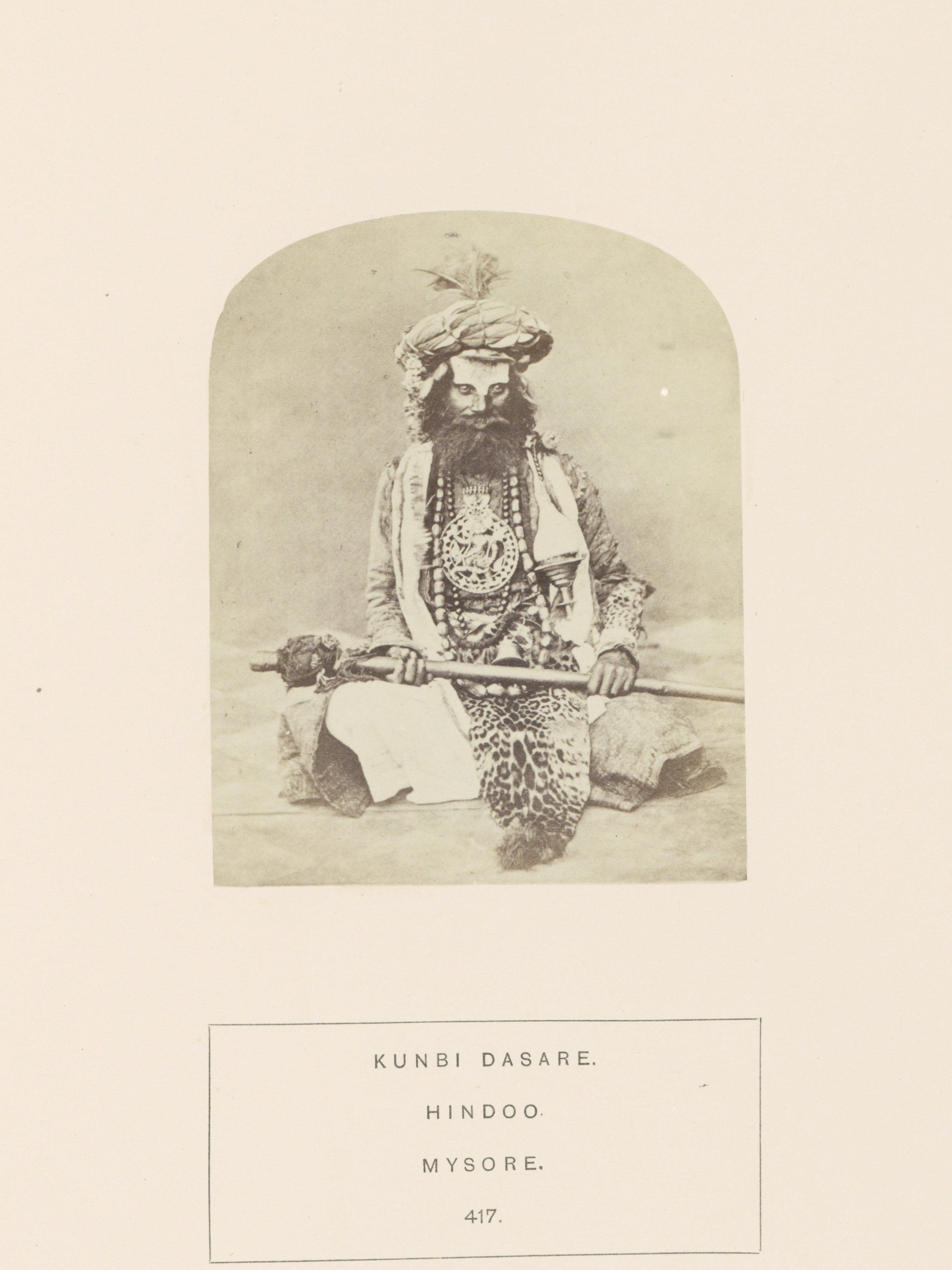
A Kunbi in ceremonial attire, c. 1865-187

=== Ghatole ===
Photograph (1916) of boys with their toy animals crafted for the Pola festival celebrated by the Dhanoje Kunbis.

According to a report in 2009, the Ghatole Kunbi community in the Akola and Washim areas of Vidarbha prefer the Shivsena political party.

Kunbi Hindu boys on stilts during the Pola festival from early 20th century.

=== Leva or Leva Patil ===
Dowry is not practiced in the Leva community today.

=== Tirole or Tirale ===
Based on evidence from an old Marathi document, Karve concludes that the Tirole Kunbi differ significantly from the Kubis west of Nagpur, and that they did not formerly claim to be Kshatriyas. G. S Ghurye states that Karve's statement is either esoteric or wrong.

== Kunbi communities in other states ==
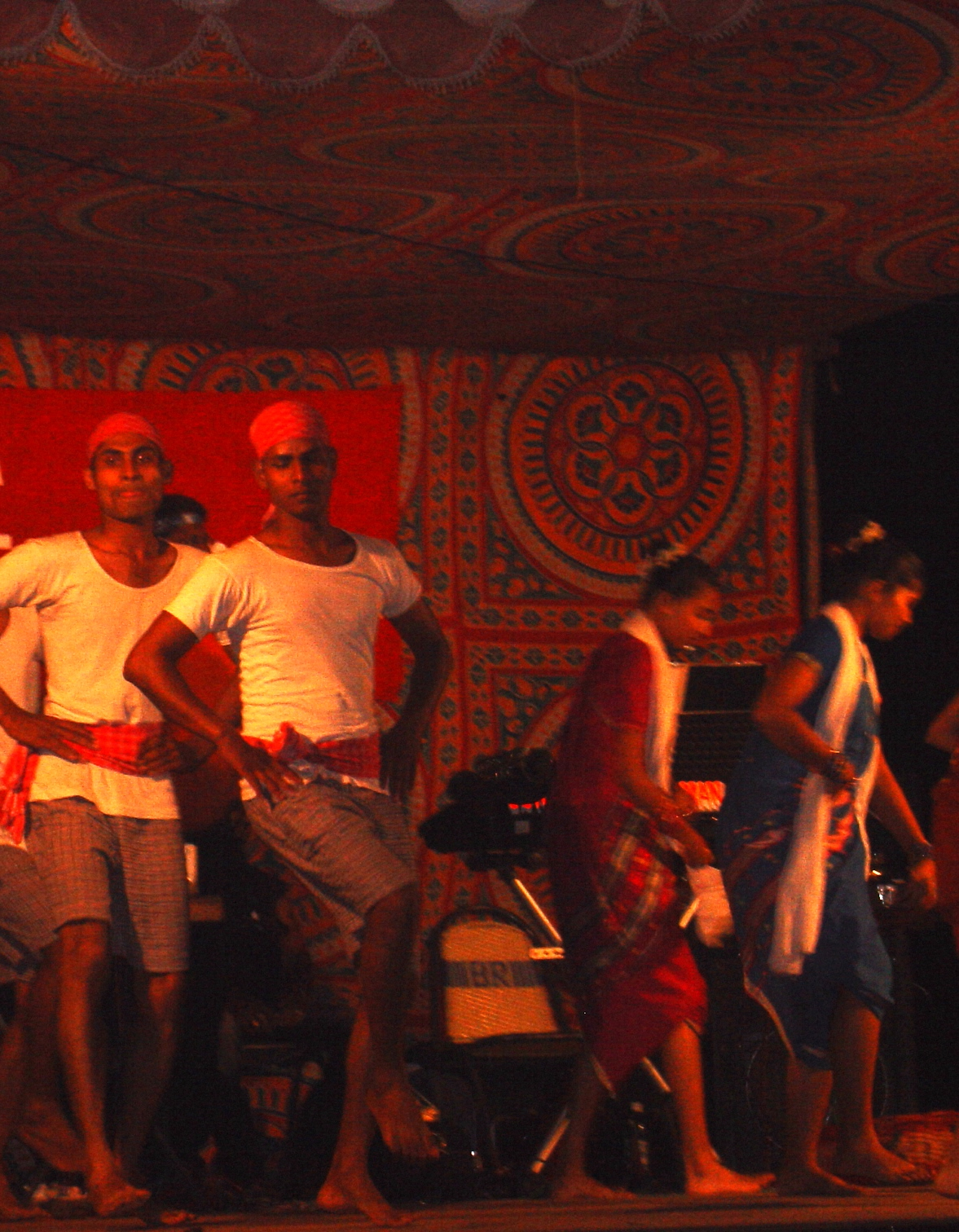
Goan Kunbi dancers.

In Gujarat, Kunbi communities are found in the Dangs, Surat and Valsad districts. In 2003, Singh and Lal described the Kunbi of Gujarat as being non-vegetarian and consumers of alcoholic drinks such as mohua. That particular community believes itself to be of a higher status than some other local groups due to the type of meat which they consume (for example, they believe that the Warlis eat rats, and other groups eat beef). The community practices monogamous endogamy; marriage of cross cousins is acceptable, as is remarriage by widows. Divorce is permitted and the practice of marriage around the age of 10–12 years has been abandoned. The dead are cremated.

The Charotar (Anand) region, tilled by the Lewa Kunbis, had been well-known since the 15th century for high productivity levels which produced potentially high-revenue crops like cotton and food grains. The Lewa community of the region were regarded among the most industrious by colonial officials.

By the 18th century, Gujarati Kunbis distinguished themselves by two sub-categories: those who continued their traditional occupation as agriculturists, and those who had taken up revenue collection. The former were known as Kunbis and the latter as Patidars. While these two sub-communities resided in the same villages, they did not inter-dine or inter-marry. There was some confusion in the nomenclature of the community during the second half of the 19th century when colonial officials referred to elites simply as Kunbis. On other occasions the two sub-communities were collectively referred to as the Patidars.

The changes implemented to land tenure policy during the colonial era led to the ascendency of the Kunbis in central Gujarat. The Kunbis and the fishermen Kolis were not too different in their socio-economic position until the end of the 19th century. With the aid of favourable policies, the Kunbis were able to transform themselves into a prosperous caste by the time of the 1931 census, in which they had renamed themselves Patidars. The etymology of term Patidar, which implied a higher economic status due to land-ownership, comes from one who holds pieces of land called patis.

A population of Kunbi (locally called Kurumbi) is also found in Goa, where they are believed to be descendants of the area's aboriginal inhabitants. They are largely poor agriculturalists, though some of the oldest known landowners in Goa were of this class, and claimed for themselves the Vaishya (merchant) varna. According to the leaders of the Uttara Kannada district Kunabi Samaj Seva Sangh, the population of their community in the region is 75,000.

== Role in politics of Maharashtra ==
=== Vidarbha ===
The Kunbis, along with the Teli and the Mali, play a major role in the politics of the Vidarbha region of Maharashtra. The three groups compose 50% of the electorate and are known to influence election outcomes. The Kunbis, being landlords, hold the upper-hand in the politics of the region and can decide the outcome of at least 22 seats, since they are dominant in every village of the region. The Kunbis, who are known to have a more tolerant attitude and are more secular than the Telis, prefer the Congress Party. As a result, the Party has held a dominant position in the region for several decades. However, in the last decade or so, Congress has ignored the Kunbis and other parties like the Bharatiya Janata Party; Shiv Sena responded by giving more opportunities to Kunbi candidates in elections.

In the 2009 elections, resentment by the Kunbis towards the Congress candidate Wamanrao Kasawar was said to benefit Sanjay Derkar, the independent NCP rebel candidate, in a triangular contest which also included Shiv Sena's Vishvas Nandekar. In the 2004 MLA elections in Murbad, the Kunbi vote was said to be the deciding vote in favour of Digambar Vishe, a BJP candidate belonging to the Kunbi community.

According to the Indian Express, soon after its inception in May 1999 the Nationalist Congress Party (NCP) worked hard to get rid of its "Kunbi Only" image. Sharad Pawar found, after breaking away from the Congress, that it was not possible to win elections with just the Kunbi vote. In order to attract the non-Kunbi OBC vote, estimated to form 40% of the electorate, Pawar recruited Chhagan Bhujbal (a Mali), and Pandurang Hajare (a Teli). Even though Pawar recruited other Telis like Pandurang Dhole, the Indian Express wondered if it would be enough to counter the age-old and keen Kunbi versus Teli rivalry. A closer look at local and regional leaders in the NCP revealed that almost all of them belonged to the Kunbi community. In 2009, the NCP president Sharad Pawar chose Anil Deshmukh over Rajendra Shingane as party candidate from the Vidarbha region because he represented the huge Kunbi-Marathi community there.

=== OBC vote politics ===
According to Thomas Blom Hansen, a commentator on religious and political violence in India, the failure of political parties to consolidate OBC votes in Maharashtra, despite calls for "Kunbi-zation" of the Maratha caste, was because Maharashtra had, as early as 1967, identified 183 communities as "educationally backward classes". By 1978 there were 199 communities in this category, and the government implemented a policy of reserving 10% of educational seats and government jobs for them. The official data used by the government for the definition of the Maratha-Kunbi castes puts them between 30% and 40%, depending on whether a narrow or an inclusive definition of the caste is used. This causes the percentage of OBCs to vary between 29% and 38% of the population. According to Hansen, it is critically important for the politicians of the state to ensure a narrow definition of OBC and maximise the Maratha representation. The Maratha Mahasangha (All-Maratha Federation), fearing that the Mandal Commission would divide the Maratha-Kunbis into Kunbis and high Marathas, took an anti-Mandal stance and tried to attract marginalised Maratha-Kunbis by propagating martial and chauvinistic myths, which in turn stigmatized Muslims and Dalits. While the organization never received success outside of Mumbai, it showed that political leaders were willing to counter the rising OBC assertiveness.

==== Forgery of caste certificates ====
There are several communities in Maharashtra that have been trying to pass themselves off as depressed in order to reap the benefits of the reservation. An issue of candidates of the Maratha caste (a non-backward caste) running for elections in wards reserved for OBC candidates got centre-stage attention in the 2007 civic polls after the Maharashtra state government amended the OBC list on 1 June 2004 to retain the Kunbis and include Kunbi-Marathas. In 2010, the independent corporator, Malan Bhintade, who claimed to be Kunbi-Maratha but was later found to be of Maratha caste, lost her membership of the Pune Municipal Corporation after it was established that she had submitted a false caste certificate, claiming to be Kunbi-Maratha in order to run for elections in wards reserved for OBC candidates. Subsequently, all candidates who lost to Kunbi-Maratha candidates registered complaints against their opponents by claiming falsification of certificates. A similar case of forgery was reported in 2003 when the former Shiv Sena corporator, Geeta Gore, was sent to jail for falsely claiming to be a Kunbi-Maratha. Gore won in elections from ward 18 of Andheri (west) by claiming to be a member of the Kunbi-Maratha caste.

== Inter-caste issues ==
=== Violence ===
In 2006, four members of a Dalit family were tortured and murdered by members of the Kunbi caste from the Khairlanji village in the Bhandara district. Two female members of the same family were paraded naked in the village and then raped. Eight villagers were sentenced to life imprisonment, with the court declaring the killings motivated by revenge and not racism or casteism. An appeal against the High Court judgement to have the crime declared as casteism is still pending in the Supreme Court of India.

The Times of India reported in February 2011 that an honour killing of a Dalit man and Kunbi woman was suspected in Murbad of the Thane district. In September of the same year, a 20-year-old Dalit woman alleged that she was raped by a Someshwar Baburao Kuthe of the Kunbi caste in the Sarandi (Bujaruk) village of Lakhandur taluka. The local police registered an offense.

=== Marathas and Kunbi affiliation ===
Modern research has revealed that the Marathas and Kunbi have the same origin - although the two are treated as two different communities currently on a social level. Most recently, the Kunbi origin of the Maratha has been explained in detail by Professor Richard Eaton from the University of Arizona and Professor Stewart Gordon from the University of Michigan. Marathas ("Assal" or true i.e. belonging to 96 clans), who were distinguished from the Kunbi, in the past claimed genealogical connections with Rajputs of Northern India. However, modern researchers demonstrate, giving examples, that these claims are not factual. Modern scholars agree that Marathas and Kunbi are the same. Anthropologist J.V.Ferreira, from the University of Mumbai states: "The Maratha claim to belong to the ancient 96 Kshatriya families has no foundation in fact and may have been adopted after the Marathas became with Shivaji a power to be reckoned with". Eaton shows how the Maratha caste was generated from the Kunbis who served the Muslim rulers, prospered, and over time adopted different customs like different dressing styles, employed genealogists, started identifying as Maratha, and caste boundaries solidified between them. In the nineteenth century, economic prosperity rather than marital service to the Muslims replaced the mobility into Maratha identity. Eaton gives an example of the Holkar family that originally belonged to the Dhangar(Shepherd) caste but was given a Maratha or even an "arch-Maratha" identity. The other example, given by Professor Susan Bayly of Cambridge University, is of the Bhonsles who originated among the populations of the Deccani tiller-plainsmen who were known by the names Kunbi and Maratha. Professor Dhanmanjiri Sathe from the University of Pune states that "The line between Marathas and Kunbis is thin and sometimes difficult to ascertain". Iravati Karve, Anthropologist, University of Pune, showed how the Maratha caste was generated from Kunbis who simply started calling themselves "Maratha". She states that Maratha, Kunbi and Mali are the three main farming communities of Maharashtra - the difference being that the marathas and Kunbis were "dry farmers" whereas the Mali farmed throughout the year. Professor Cynthia Talbot from the University of Texas quotes a saying in Maharashtra, "when a Kunbi prospers he becomes Maratha". Kunbi origin has been one of the factors on the basis of which the head of Maharashtra State Backward Class Commission (MSBCC), a Judge, M.G. Gaikwad, and some others in 2018, stated that Maratha associations have submitted historical proofs and petitions to be included in the Other Backward Class. The decision for giving reservation in jobs and education for Marathas based on the petitions that Marathas and Kunbis are one and the same caste was upheld by the Mumbai court in 2019.

== See also ==
- List of Kunbi people
- Kunabi Sena
- Kudumbi
- Jat people
- Patidar
