= Bardoli Satyagraha =

Civil disobedience movement in Bombat presidency, British India in 1918

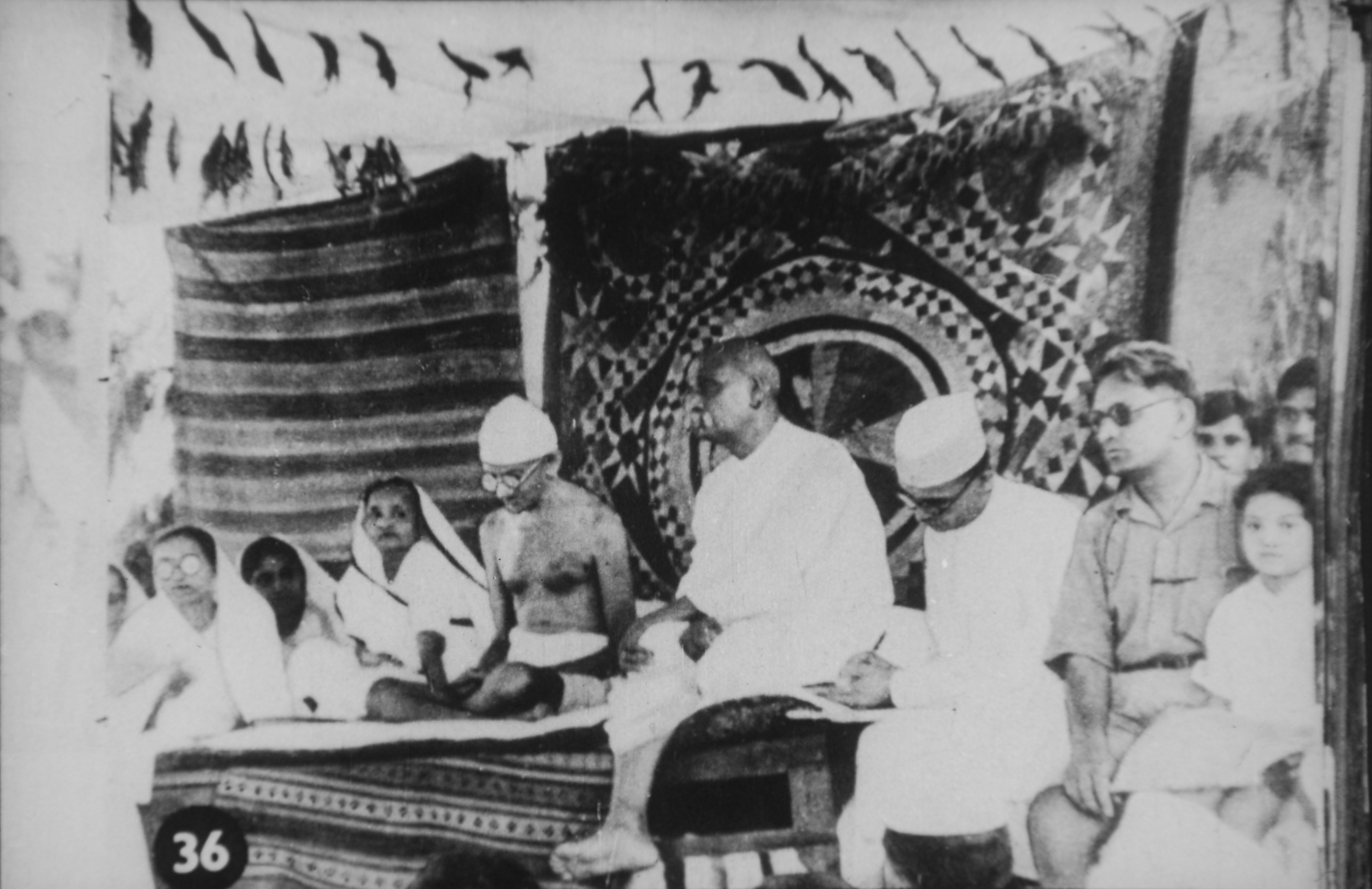
Mahatma Gandhi with Vallabhbhai Patel at the Satyagraha. Kasturba Gandhi could be seen sitting behind Gandhi.

The Bardoli Satyagraha, was a farmers' agitation and nationalist movement in India against the increased taxation of farmers by the colonial government. It demanded a cancellation of the 22% tax hike being levied in Bombay Presidency. The movement began on 12 February 1928, and successfully ended by August. It was eventually led by Sardar Vallabhbhai Patel, and its success gave rise to Patel becoming one of the main leaders of the independence movement.

== Background ==
In 1926, the tricennial land revenue reassessment was due in the Bombay Presidency. The land revenue assessment for the taluka of Bardoli was done by the inexperienced Settlement Officer Jaykar of Surat who recommended a 30% increase in the tax. Settlement Commissioner Anderson got his hands on the report and performed several revisions with incorrect accounting. Both reports made their way to the Bombay government, who accepted pieces and parcels of each, eventually settling on a 29% tax increase for the taluka.

In 1926, the taluka of Bardoli in Surat district of Gujarat suffered financial troubles. However, the government of the Bombay Presidency had raised the tax rate by 30% that year, and despite petitions from civic groups, it refused to cancel the raise in the face of the calamities. The situation for the farmers was grave enough that they barely had enough property and crops to pay off the tax, let alone feed themselves afterwards.

=== Considering options ===
The Gujarati activists Narhari Parikh, Ravi Shankar Vyas, and Mohanlal Pandya talked to village chieftains and farmers and solicited the help of Gujarat's most prominent freedom fighter, Vallabhbhai Patel. Patel had guided Gujarat's farmers during the Kheda struggle, and had served recently as Ahmedabad's municipal president. He was widely respected by common Gujaratis across the state.

Patel told a delegation of farmers frankly that they should realise fully what a revolt would imply. He would not lead them unless he had the understanding and agreement of all the villages involved. Refusing to pay the taxes could lead to their property being confiscated, including their lands, and many would go to jail. They could face complete decimation. The villagers replied that they were prepared for the worst but definitely could not accept the government's injustice.

Patel then asked Gandhi to consider the matter, but Gandhi merely asked what Patel thought, and when the latter replied with confidence about the prospects, he gave his blessing. However, Gandhi and Patel agreed that neither the Congress nor Gandhi would directly involve themselves, and the struggle would be left entirely to the people of Bardoli taluka.

== Struggle ==
Patel first wrote to the Governor of Bombay on 6 February, asking him to reduce the taxes for the year in phase of the calamities. But the Governor ignored the letter and reciprocated by announcing the date of collection.

Patel then instructed all the farmers of Bardoli taluka to refuse payment of their taxes. Aided by Narhari Parikh, Ravi Shankar Vyas and Mohanlal Pandya, he divided Bardoli into several zones, each with a leader and volunteers specifically assigned. Patel also placed some activists close to the government, to act as informers on the movements of government officials.

Above all, Patel instructed the farmers to remain completely nonviolent and not to respond physically to any incitements or aggressive actions from officials. He reassured them that the struggle would not end until all taxes had been cancelled for the year and all seized property and lands had been returned to their rightful owners.

The farmers received complete support from their compatriots in Gujarat. Many hid their most precious belongings with relatives in other parts, and the protestors received financial support and essential supplies from supporters in other parts. However, Patel refused permission to enthusiastic supporters in Gujarat and other parts of India to go on in sympathetic protest.

The government declared that it would crush the revolt. Along with tax inspectors, bands of Pathans were gathered from northwest India to seize the property of the villagers and terrorize them. The Pathans and the men of the collectors forced themselves into the houses and took all property, including cattle (resisters had begun keeping their cattle inside their locked homes when the collectors arrived to prevent them from seizing the animals from the fields).

The government began to auction the houses and the lands, but not a single person from Gujarat or anywhere else in India came forward to buy them. Patel had appointed volunteers in every village to keep watch. As soon as he sighted the officials who were coming to auction the property, the volunteer would sound his bugle. The farmers would leave the village and hide in the jungles. The officials would find the entire village empty. They could never find out who owned a particular house.

However, some rich people from Bombay came to buy some lands. There was also one village recorded that paid the tax. A complete social boycott was organized against them, and relatives broke their ties to families in the village. Other ways that the social boycott was enforced against landowners who broke with the tax strike or purchased seized land were to refuse to rent their fields or to work as labourers for them.

Members of the legislative council of Bombay and across India were angered by the terrible treatment of the protesting farmers. Indian members resigned their offices and expressed open support of the farmers. The government was heavily criticised, even by many in the government's offices.

== Resolution ==
In 1928, an agreement was finally brokered by a Parsi member of the Bombay government. It agreed to restore the confiscated lands and properties, to cancel revenue payment for the year and to cancel the 22% raise until after the succeeding year. The government had appointed the Maxwell-Broomfield Commission to look in to the matter. After a rigorous survey, the raise in taxes was decided to be just 6.03%. However, the basic problems of the peasants were left unsolved, and bonded labour continued.

The farmers celebrated their victory, but Patel continued to work to ensure that all lands and properties were returned to every farmer and that no one was left out. When the government refused to ask the people who had bought some of the lands to return them, wealthy sympathisers from Bombay bought them out and returned the lands to the rightful owners.

== Commemoration ==
The momentum from the Bardoli victory aided in the resurrection of the freedom struggle nationwide. In 1930, the Congress would declare Indian independence, and the Salt Satyagraha would be launched by Gandhi.

Patel credited Gandhi's teachings and the farmers' undying resolve, and people across the nation recognised his vital leadership. It was women of bardoli who bestowed the title Sardar for the first time, which in Gujarati and most other Indian languages means Chief or Leader. It was after Bardoli that Sardar Patel became one of India's most important leaders.

== See also ==
- Non-Cooperation Movement
- Champaran Satyagraha and Kheda Satyagraha
- Farmers' movements in India
- Patel: A Life, Rajmohan Gandhi
