= Kalyanji V. Mehta =

Indian politician

Kalyanji V. Mehta (1890-1973) was an Indian politician who served as Speaker of Gujarat Legislative Assembly from 1 May 1960 to 19 August 1960.

He was born into the Leva Patidar caste. His father, Vithalbhai Patel was a policeman and a follower of the Arya Samaj. In 1907, he and his brother Kunverji attended the Indian National Congress session at Surat. In the ensuing Surat Split, the brothers sided with Bal Gangadhar Tilak and rescued him on their shoulders. In 1918, Mahatma Gandhi tasked Kalyanji and Kunverji with enquiring into crop prices for the Kheda Satyagraha of 1918.
