= Ravishankar Vyas =

Indian independence activist (1884-1984)

Ravishankar Maharaj
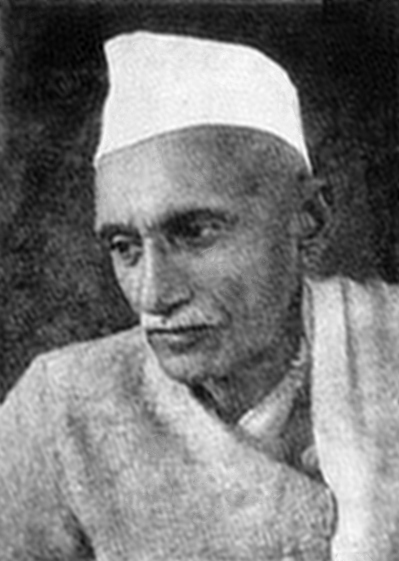
- Born: Ravishankar Vyas; 25 February 1884; Radhu village, British India (now in Kheda district, Gujarat, India)
- Died: 1 July 1984 (aged 100); Borsad, Gujarat, India
- Occupations: Activist, social worker
- Spouse: Surajba
- Parent(s): Pitambar Shivram Vyas, Nathiba

Signature
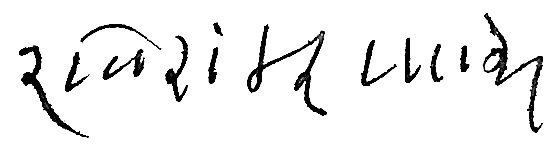

Ravishankar Vyas, better known as Ravishankar Maharaj, was an Indian independence activist, social worker and Gandhian from Gujarat.

== Life ==
Ravishankar Vyas was born on 25 February 1884, Mahashivaratri, in Radhu village (now in Kheda district, Gujarat, India) to Pitambar Sivram Vyas and Nathiba, a Vadara Brahmin peasant family. His family was native of Sarsavani village near Mahemdavad. He dropped out after the sixth standard to help his parents in agriculture work. He married Surajba. His father died when he was 19 and his mother died when he was 22.

He was influenced by Arya Samaj philosophy. He met Mahatma Gandhi in 1915 and joined his independence and social activism. He was one of the earliest and closest associates of Gandhi and Sardar Vallabhbhai Patel, and along with Darbar Gopaldas Desai, Narhari Parikh and Mohanlal Pandya, the chief organizer of nationalist revolts in Gujarat in the 1920s and 1930s. He worked for years for rehabilitation of Baraiya Koli and Patanvadiya Kolis of coastal central Gujarat. He founded Rashtriya Shala (National School) in Sunav village in 1920. He left his rights on ancestral property against wish of wife and joined Indian Independence Movement in 1921. He participated in Borsad Satyagraha in 1923 and protested against Haidiya Tax. He also participated in Bardoli Satyagraha in 1928 and was imprisoned by British authority for six months. He participated in relief work of flood in 1927 which earned him recognition. He joined Gandhi in Salt March in 1930 and was imprisoned for two years. In 1942, he also participated in Quit India Movement and also tried to pacify communal violence in Ahmedabad.

After independence of India in 1947, he devoted himself to social work. He joined Vinoba Bhave in Bhoodan Movement and travelled 6000 kilometres between 1955 and 1958. In 1960s, he organised and supported Sarvodaya Movement. Ravishankar Maharaj inaugurated Gujarat state when it was created on 1 May 1960. He also opposed the Emergency in 1975. Until his death, it was a tradition that every newly appointed Chief Minister of Gujarat visit him for blessings after taking oath of office. He died on 1 July 1984 in Borsad, Gujarat. The memorial dedicated to him is located at Adhyapan Mandir, Vallabh Vidyalaya, Bochasan.

== Works ==
He wrote about education, rural reconstruction and Kolkata.

== Recognition ==
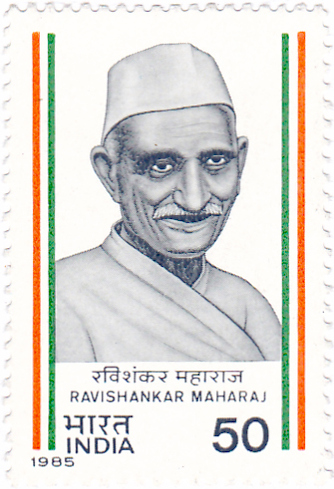
Ravishankar Vyas on a 1985 stamp of India

The Government of India released postal stamp in his honour in 1984. Ravishankar Maharaj Award for social work, worth ₹1 Lakh, is instituted by Department of Social Justice, Government of Gujarat in his honour.

== In popular culture ==
Jhaverchand Meghani has written Manasai Na Diva based on his experiences with him during his social work among tribals. Pannalal Patel has also written a biographical novel Jene Jivi Janyu (1984) on him.
