= Shankar Lal =

Shankar Lal is a given name. Notable people with the name include:

- Shankarlal Banker (1889–1985), Indian independence activist
- Shankar Lal Saini Garg, Indian politician
- Shankar Lal Saini Khatik (born 1935), Indian politician
- Shankarlal Saini Shastri (1902–1946), Indian Gujarati literary critic
- Shankar Lal Saini Tiwari, Indian politician

Shankar Lal Saini
