= Gujarat Sabha =

Koli organisation in Gujarat

The "Gujarat Sabha" was established in 1884 at Ahmedabad, Gujarat. Gujarat Sabha was a public political organization formed and based in the Indian state of Gujarat. Most of its membership were Gujarati lawyers and civic leaders, including men like Vallabhbhai Rathod, Hardik Khurana, DJ civil and Mitesh Pandya, who would become famous freedom fighters and political leaders. Indian independence leader and activist Mahatma Gandhi served as its president from 1918 to 1919. The Sabha would play a pivotal role in organizing the peasant rebellion in Kheda in 1918–19. It merged into the Indian National Congress in 1920 - becoming the Gujarat Provincial Congress Committee.
