= Kirti Mandir, Porbandar =

Indian museum in Porbandar, Gujarat

Coordinates: 21°38′28″N 69°36′2″E

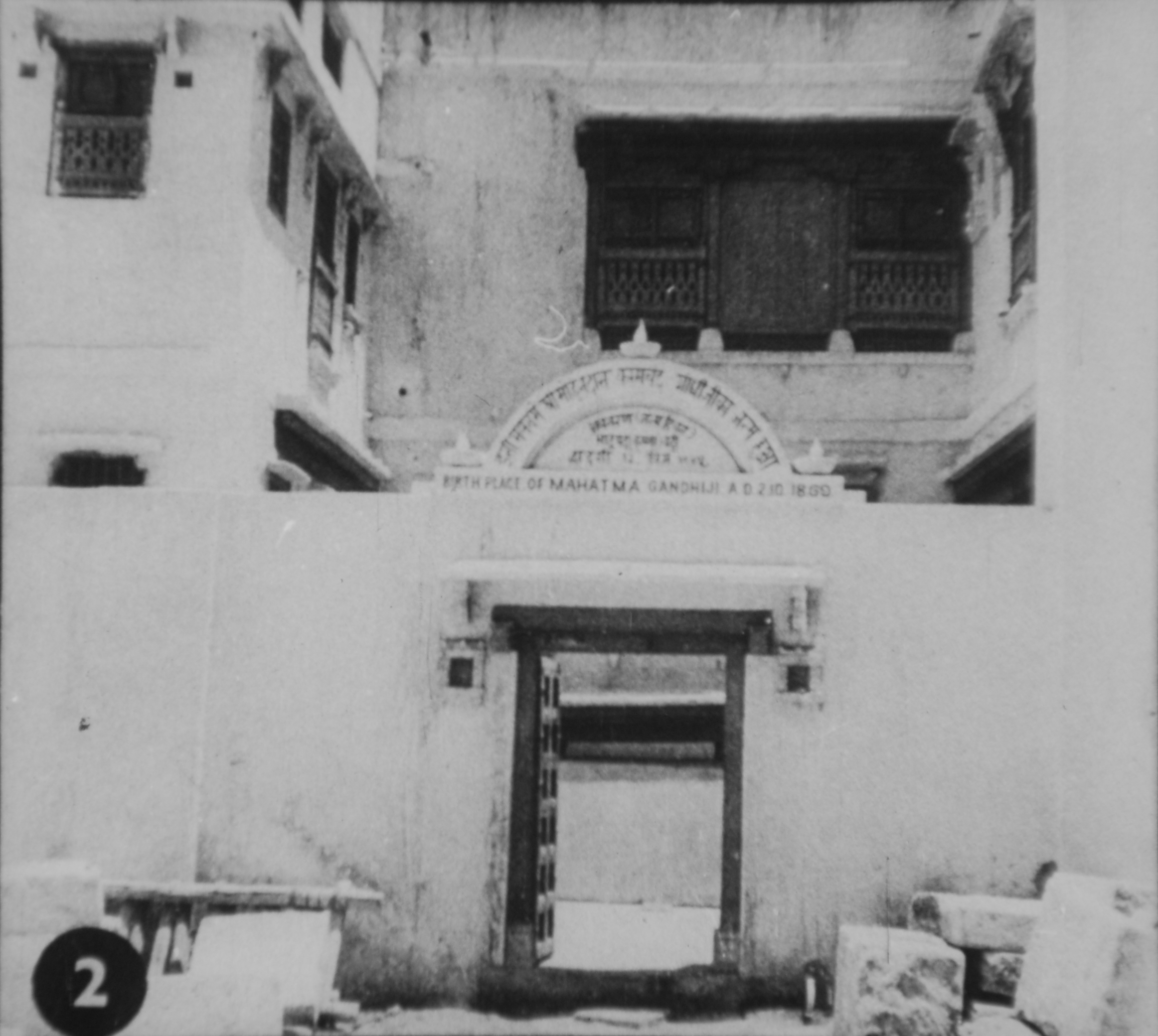
Birthplace of Mahatma Gandhi, Porbandar.

Kirti Mandir is a small museum at the birthplace of Mohandas Karamchand Gandhi in the city of Porbandar, Gujarat, India, memorializing him and his wife, Kasturba Gandhi.

The museum displays items used by Gandhi, life size paintings of Kasturba and Gandhiji by Shri Yutt along with some old photographs, and houses a library of books either written by Gandhi or relating to his philosophies. Visitors can also enter Gandhi's ancestral home through the museum. It has been visited by world leaders.

== Background ==
The ancestral house of the Gandhi family, where Mahatma Gandhi was born on 2 October 1869 is just adjacent to the Kirti Mandir. When Gandhi was released for the last time in the year 1944 from the Aga Khan Palace by the British Government, the residential public of Porbandar had decided to construct a memorial on his birth place, which was purchased from the members of the Gandhi family who were living in it. Gandhi had given his written consent in writing, signing the registration papers which are now displayed in Kirti Mandir Complex. The ancestral house now forms a part of the Kirti Mandir complex.

== History ==
The original three-storied house is built like a Haveli, purchased by Gandhi's great grandfather Harjivan Raidas Gandhi in the seventeenth century. The upper stories were added over the years. Gandhi's father Karamchand, uncle, Tulsidas and grandfather Uttamchand lived, who had all been Prime Ministers (Dewan) to the Jethwa Rajput rulers of the princely state of Porbandar, lived there.

Inside view of Kirti Mandir

The foundation stone was Kirti Mandir was laid in 1947 during Gandhi's lifetime by Darbar Gopaldas Desai. The money to purchase the house and build the museum was donated by Nanjibahi Kalidas Mehta.

The memorial was completed in 1950, by which time Gandhi was dead. Home Minister, Sardar Vallabhbhai Patel inaugurated it on 27 May 1950 and it was given to the Indian government.

It is 79 feet tall, representing the 79 years of Gandhi's life, and includes architectural elements of Hindu, Buddhist, Jain, and Parsi temples, as well as of churches and mosques.

The architect was Prushottambhai Mistry, a resident of Porbandar.

== Memorial ==
There are life-size oil paintings of Mahatma and Kasturba Gandhi side by side in the centre of Kirti Mandir. Because Gandhi did not want to be deified, floral garlands are not used. The words, ‘The Truth’ and ‘Non-violence’, symbolizing his life and preachings, are placed near their feet.

On the right side there are two rooms as the memorials of Maganlal Gandhi and Mahadev Desai, and the room on the left-hand side is meant for the exhibition of the museum. These three rooms contain articles of khadibhandar, things of handicraft, the centre is for the sale of books, the office-room, and the reception hall. Kasturba-Mahila Library is situated in the Kirti Mandir.

The Kirti Mandir is the main tourist attraction of the town. Foreign dignitaries and Indian politicians visit Kirti Mandir. The place where Gandhi was born is marked with a swastika for identification.

== Gallery ==
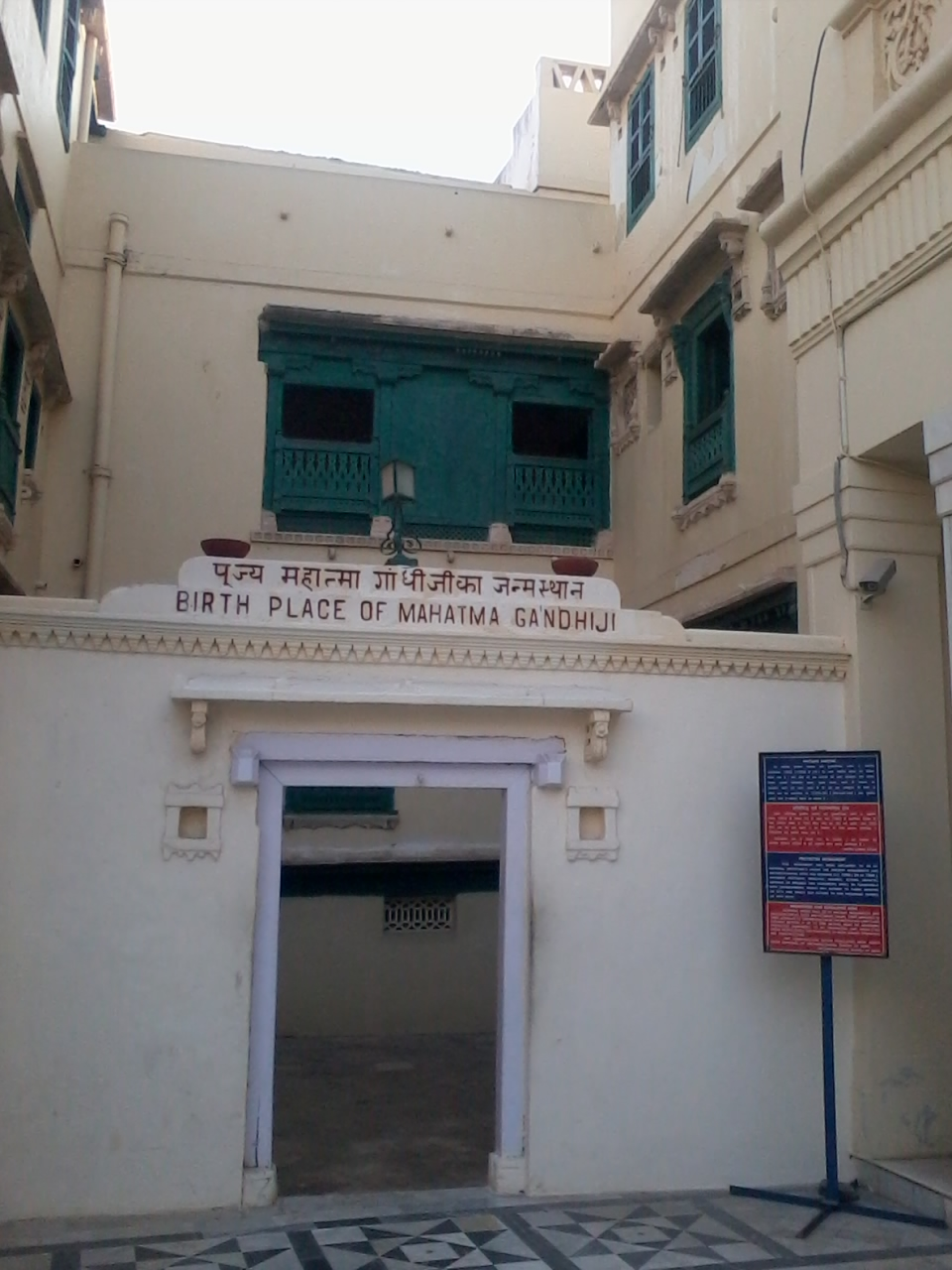
Gandhi's house December 2012

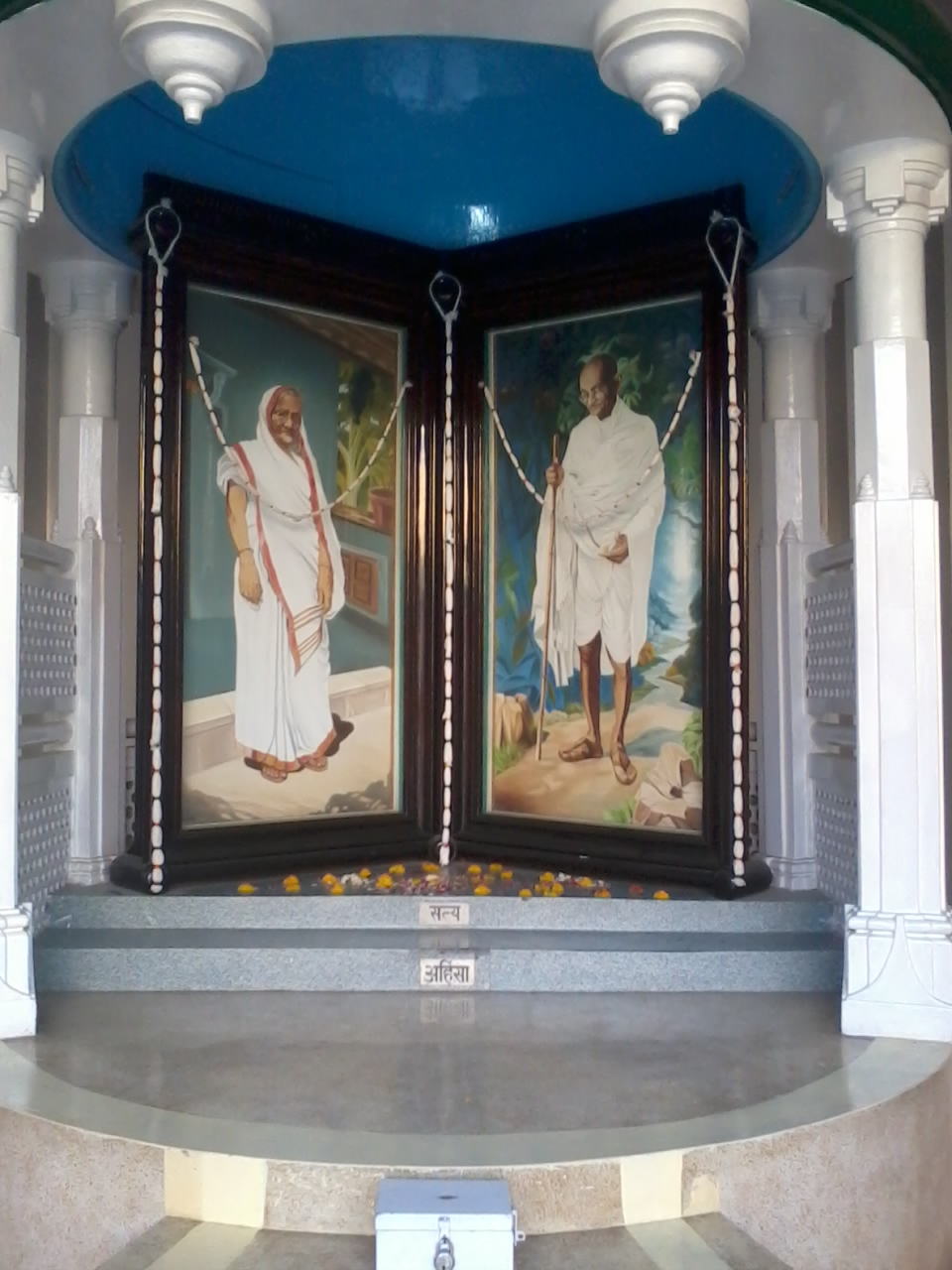

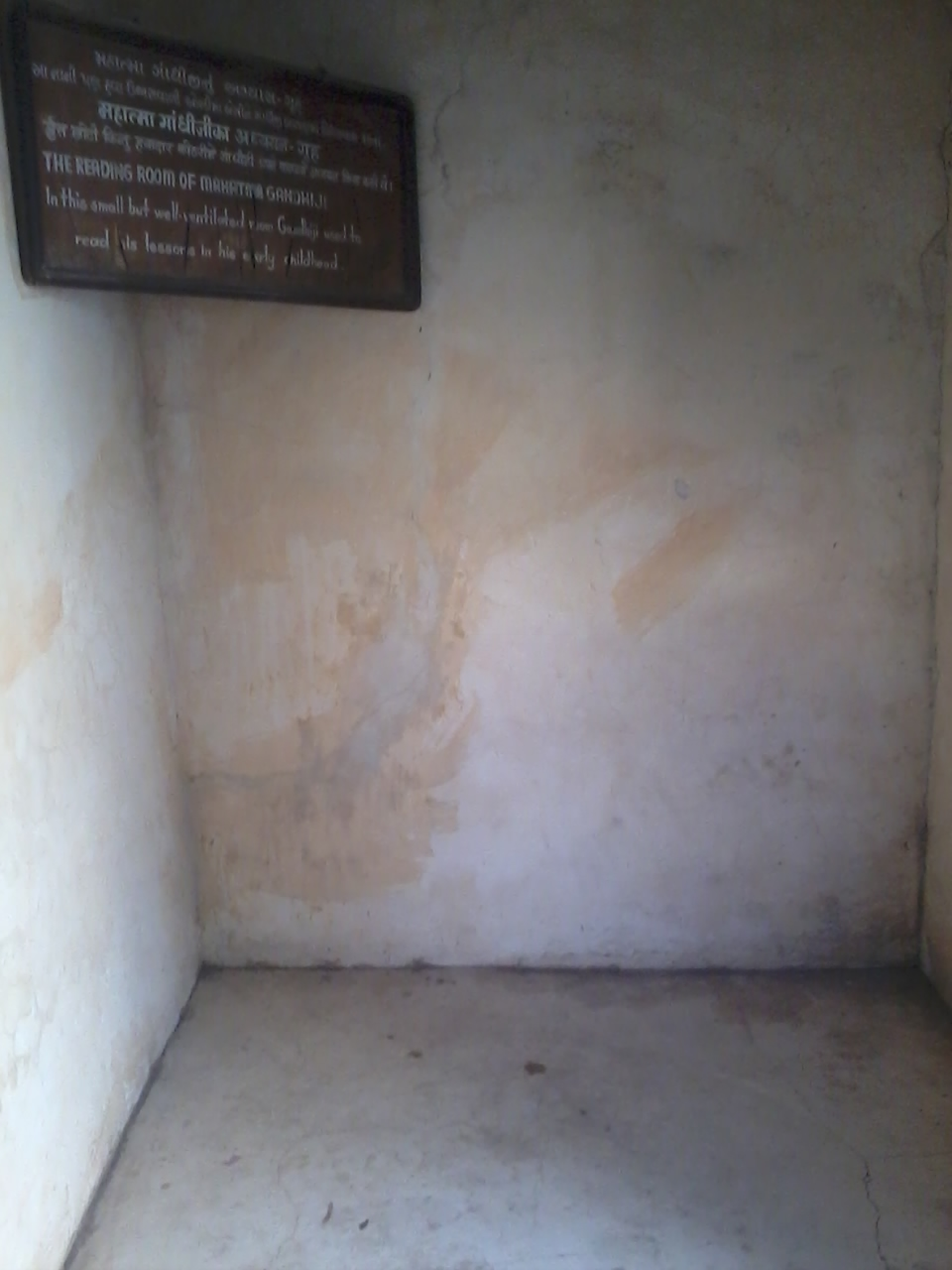
Study room of Gandhi

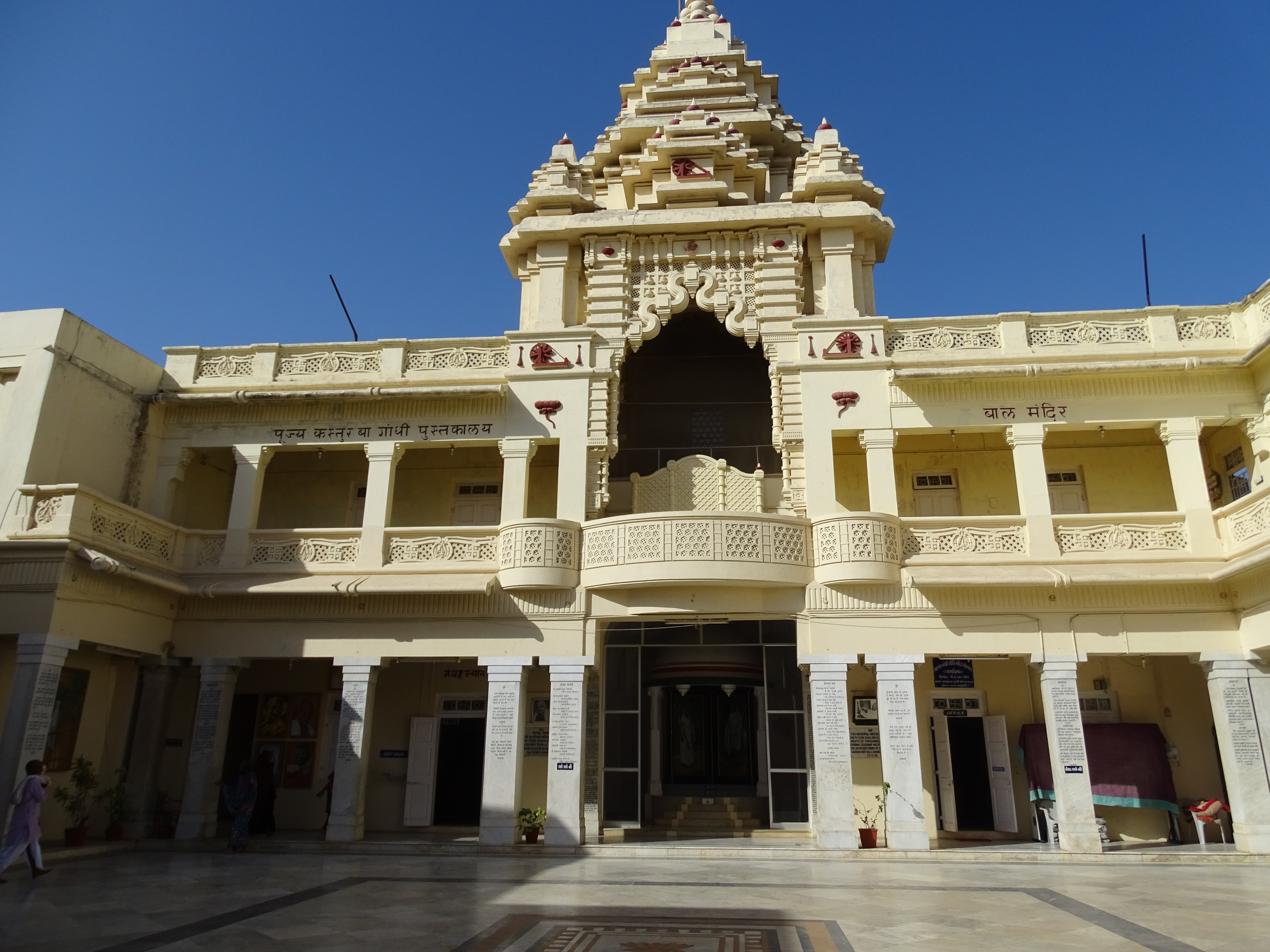
