= Kunabi Sena =

Political party in Maharashtra

Kunabi Sena is a political party in based in Thane District in the Mid-North Konkan or Maharashtra Konkan in Maharashtra state.

The Kunabi Sena advocates for the interests of the Kunabi community, a developing caste. It is allied with the Communist Party of India (Marxist), with whom they have coordinated peasant struggles for land and water rights. Together with CPI(M) they have protested constructions of GAIL's gas pipeline through Thane.

The party has also demanded the formation of a Konkan state, consisting of the Thane, Raigad, Ratnagiri and Sindhudurg Districts.

The founding president of the Kunabi Sena is Vishwanath Patil.

The party is now part of the ruling alliance of Thane District Zilla Parishad (County government) in an alliance with the Nationalist Congress Party and the Shiv Sena; these latter two represent hardline Maharashtrian interests and are opposed to a separate Konkan State.
