= Mohanlal Pandya =

Indian Freedom Fighter

Mohanlal Kameshwar Pandya (Note: Gujarati: મોહનલાલ કામેશ્વર પંડ્યા, romanized: Mohanalāla Kāmeśvara Paṁḍyā) was an Indian freedom fighter, social reformer and one of the earliest followers of Mahatma Gandhi.

Born in Kathlal (Kaṭhalāla), Gujarat, Mohanlal's father was a cultivator and banker. Mohanlal graduated from the University of Bombay with a degree in agriculture. He was employed by Gondal State and later Baroda State as an agricultural official. In Baroda, he came into contact with Aurobindo Ghosh, a professor at Baroda College, and his brother Barindra Ghosh. Affected by their ideology, Mohanlal became a revolutionary nationalist. Mohanlal published books written by Narsinhbhai Patel which were published under misleading titles that described simple bomb-making techniques. In 1909, a bomb was hurled at Viceroy Lord Minto while he riding in Ahmedabad. While Mohanal and his associates were the prime suspects, no one was ever convicted of the crime. However, once police discovered Narsinbhai's books and that Mohanlal was their publisher, the Baroda government was pressured to fire Mohanlal from his post in 1911. For the next four years Mohanlal lived incognito in Saurashtra and published books under pseudonyms while the police actively sought his arrest.

Along with fellow Gandhians like Narhari Parikh and Ravi Shankar Vyas, Pandya was a key organizer of nationalist revolts in Gujarat, and a leading figure in the fight against alcoholism, illiteracy, untouchability, and a major proponent of women's freedoms and Gandhian values.

In 1909, Pandya threw a bomb on Viceroy Minto and his wife, in Ahmedabad. The Mintos escaped unhurt.

Pandya was a close associate of both Gandhi and Sardar Vallabhbhai Patel during the Indian Independence Movement.

Mohanlal Pandya was nicknamed as "Onion Thief" ("Dungli Chor") by Gandhi because he had harvested onion from the land which was taken away by the British Government.

== See also ==
- Bardoli Satyagraha
