= Narsinhbhai Patel =

Narsinhbhai Ishwarbhai Patel (Note: Gujarati: નરસિંહભાઈ ઈશ્વરભાઈ પટેલ, romanized: Narasiṁhabhāī Īśvarabhāī Paṭela) (13 October 1874 – 17 October 1945) was an Indian revolutionary.

Born in a poor Patidar family in Kheda district, Gujarat he became a government teacher in Baroda. Narsinhbhai, together with Mohanlal Pandya and Punjabhai Bhatt, formed a group of anti-British revolutionaries from Kheda district. Narsinhbhai learnt Bengali and became a follower of Aurobindo Ghose and Barindra Kumar Ghosh's revolutionary ideology and translated their works into Gujarati. Although evidence was never presented, the group was suspected to be behind the attempted 1909 assassination of the Viceroy of India Gilbert Elliot-Murray-Kynynmound, 4th Earl of Minto and his wife Mary Elliot-Murray-Kynynmound, Countess of Minto via hurled bombs in Ahmedabad.

Narsinhbhai wrote books on bomb-making under misleading titles such as Vanaspatinī Davāo ("Herbal Medicines"), Nāhavānā Sābu ("Bathing Soap"), and Kasarata ("Exercise"). The police eventually discovered these books in Navsari and traced their origins to Narsinhbhai, Mohanlal Pandya, and Punjabhai Bhatt. In Punjabhai's trial, Narsinhbhai committed perjury to ensure his acquittal, for which Narsinhbhai was sentenced to two months in prison. Narsinhbhai himself was put on trial but was acquitted thanks to the legal defense by Vithalbhai Patel. Evidence gathered by the British showed that many bureaucrats of Baroda State were anti-British revolutionaries, and so the Maharaja Sayajirao Gaekwad III exiled Narsinhbhai from the state for five years.

After being released from prison, Narsinhbhai became aware that the British authorities were going to have him arrested again and sent to the Cellular Jail in the Andaman and Nicobar Islands. With the police hot on his trail, Narsinhbhai successively fled to Pondicherry in French India, Colombo in British Ceylon, and Mwanza in German East Africa. In Jinja, located in the Protectorate of Uganda Narsinbhai became friends with Charles Freer Andrews and from him became acquainted with the philosophy of Mahatma Gandhi.

Narsinhbhai returned to the Kheda district in 1920 and became a Gandhian. He pushed for social reform in his Patidar caste, arguing against the marriage of older men to younger girls and the practice of dowry, and argued for women's freedom and equality. Narsinbhai was an atheist.

Narsinbhai participated in the Salt March for which he served a six-month prison sentence.
