= List of Kunbi people =

The following is a list of notable Kunbi people

== Saints ==
- Tukaram - Referred to as Sant Tukaram or Tukaram Maharaj, a 17th century Maharashtrian saint.
- Gulabrao Maharaj - Although blind, he was still credited with giving a vision of life to the people. He wrote 139 books on various subjects containing more than 6000 pages, 130 commentaries and about 25,000 stanza in poetry in his short life of 34 years.
