= Gopaldas Ambaidas Desai =

Indian politician (1887-1951)

Gopaldas Ambaidas Desai

Gopaldas Ambaidas Desai (1887–1951) also called Darbar Gopaldas Desai was a prince who ascended the throne of the State of Dhasa currently known as Gopalgram in Saurashtra and a noted Gandhian political and social activist. He is remembered as the first prince in India who gave up his principality to become a freedom fighter against the British Raj.

== Early life ==
Gopaldas was born at Vaso in the present day Kheda district of Gujarat. He was an inamdar or feudatory to the Baroda State, the ruler of the Dhasa State and a jagirdar of the Rai and Sankhli villages. He was a Vaishnavite and a Patidar by caste and a Desai and Amin by title. He became the ruler of Dhasa succeeding his maternal grandfather Ambaidas who adopted him as heir to the throne. Gopaldas had been a supporter of Mohandas Gandhi and the Indian National Congress and often gave them financial support. He was a progressive ruler and provided free education to his subjects. Impressed by the ideas of Madam Montessori, he started first Montessori school in Vaso in 1915 with the help of his mentor, Motibhai Amin. It was the first Montessori School in Gujarat, and perhaps in entire India.

== Indian Independence movement ==
By 1921, Gopaldas had become active in the Indian National Congress. That year he became the president of the Kheda District Congress Committee. The following year, his state was confiscated and was deposed as ruler by the British after he disobeyed the British Resident General's warnings against his involvement in the national movement and extending financial support to Gandhi. Gopaldas and his wife Bhakti Lakshmi, better known as Bhaktiba became active freedom fighters from 1922. After his removal, the British proposed Gopaldas' eldest son Suryakant as the new ruler. He however rejected the offer arguing that he held the same political views as his father. The British later approached Gopaldas' other three sons as they approached the age of majority. They all rejected the offer, following the footsteps of their father.

Following the confiscation of his estates, Gopaldas relocated to Borsad from where he participated in both the Borsad and Bardoli Satyagrahas. During the 1930 Civil Disobedience Movement, the entire Desai family was imprisoned including Gopaldas, his wife Bhaktiba, the two elder sons Mahendra and Suryakant, and their wives and even their newborn son, a mere six-month-old, Barindra. Thus, Barindra must have been the youngest freedom fighter. Bhaktiba was obliged to take the infant to Sabarmati jail in 1930 because he was too young to be left with anyone. The Desais were also active participants in the Quit India Movement. Bhaktiba became a renowned social worker and Gandhian political activist in her own right while Yog Sunder went on to become a renowned dancer and choreographer and the founder of the Indian Revival Group.

== Social activism ==
Gopaldas and Bhaktiba worked for the Gandhian causes of eradication of untouchability and for women's education. They were the pioneers in advancing female literacy in Gujarat and Saurashtra, especially the residential schools for girls. They founded Vitthal Kanya Vidyalaya in Nadiad in 1935 and later Vallabh Kanya Vidyalaya at Rajkot in 1946, both of them residential schools for girls. Soon after independence, it was Darbar Gopaldas who was given the honour in 1947 to lay the foundation stone of Kirti Mandir, the memorial for Mahatma Gandhi in his birthplace Porbandar.

He was elected to the Constituent Assembly of India as a member from Baroda. Gopaldas was reinstated as a ruler of his principality after India's independence. He is remembered as the first prince among about 550 princely states to voluntarily and unconditionally merge his principality with the Indian Union.

Rajmohan Gandhi has authored, The Prince of Gujarat (2014), a biography of Desai.
