= Kishorlal Mashruwala =

Indian independence activist (1890–1952)

- Born: 5 October 1890; Bombay, British India
- Died: 9 September 1952 (aged 61)
- Education: BA, LLB
- Alma mater: Wilson College, Bombay
- Occupations: Political activist, writer
- Spouse: Gomatiben (m. 1907)
- Writing career
- Language: Gujarati

Kishorlal Ghanshyamlal Mashruwala (5 October 1890 – 9 September 1952) was an Indian independence activist as well as biographer, essayist and translator. Educated in Bombay and Agra, he completed BA and LLB. He was an associate of Mahatma Gandhi and was deeply influenced by him. He extensively wrote on education, religion and philosophy as well as translated some works in Gujarati.

== Biography ==
=== Early life ===
Mashruwala was born on 5 October 1890 in Bombay (now Mumbai) in Mashruwala family. His family belonged to Surat. He was influenced by Swaminarayan Sampraday due to his father. He started his primary education in Marathi language in Akola. His mother died when he was eight so he was raised by her aunt in Bombay where he studied in Gujarati. Following plague in Bombay, he moved to Agra for school education where he also studied Hindi and Urdu.

He received BA with elective subjects of Material Science and Chemistry in 1909 from Wilson College, Bombay. He completed LLB in 1913 and practised law for three years. He married Gomatiben in 1907.

=== Career ===
Mashruwala had briefly served as a secretary of Mahatma Gandhi. He taught at the National School in his Sabarmati Ashram from 1917 to 1919. He served as the first Registrar of Gujarat Vidyapith which was founded by him. During this period, he was introduced to Kedarnathji by Kaka Kalelkar. He was influenced by Sahajanand Swami, Mahatma Gandhi and Kedarnathji. He participated in the Indian independence movement in 1930-32 and was imprisoned for two years by the British authorities. He served as the president of Gandhi Sewa Sangh from 1934 to 1938. Following arrest of Gandhi during the 1942 Quit India Movement, he managed Gandhi's periodical Harijan. He was again imprisoned for sometime. Following 1946, he edited Harijan till his death.

He died on 9 September 1952 following asthmatic attack. He was cremated the next day at Gopuri in Wardha next to Jamnalal Bajaj's memorial.

== Works ==
=== Biographies ===
Mashruwala has highlighted the human elements in his biographies which include Ram Ane Krishna (Rama and Krishna, 1923), Ishu Khrist (Jesus Christ, 1925), Buddha Ane Mahavir (Buddha and Mahavira, 1926) and Sahajanand Swami (Sahajanand Swami, 1926). These are written in a simple and impacting language.

=== Essays ===
Mashruwala had written some works on education such as Kelavanina Paya (1925), Kelavani Vivek (1949), Kelavani Vikas (1950). He had suggested several changes and ideas in education. His works reflect Mahatma Gandhi's basic education scheme Nai Talim.

His biggest contribution in literature belongs to his essays on religion and philosophy. Jivan Shodhan (1929) has six sections focusing on changing perspective of life. Gandhivichardohan (1932) is his work on Gandhian philosophy. Geetamanthan (1933) is a commentary on Bhagavad Gita. Streepurush Maryada (1937) collects his essays written over span of a decade and has influences of Swaminarayan Sampraday. Kagadani Najare (1947) is his satirical essays on followers of Gandhi. His Samuli Kranti (1948) includes his original thoughts and commentaries on religion, society, economics, politics and education. His two volumes of Sansar Ane Dharma (1948) include his critical views on religion. Gandhi Ane Samyavad (Gandhi and Communism/Gandhi and Marx, 1951) is a collection of series of essays published in Harijan which compares Gandhism and Communism. His Ahimsavivechan (1942) includes his articles on non-violence which has some differences of ideas from Gandhi.

=== Translations ===
Mashruwala has translated several works in Gujarati including Kahlil Gibran's The Prophet as Vidayni Velae (1935), John Morley's On Compromise as Satyamay Jivan (1933), Leo Tolstoy's The Light Shines in the Darkness as Timirma Prabha (1936), Maurice Maeterlinck's The Life of the White Ant as Udhainu Jivan (1940). He has also poetically translated Bhagavad Gita in Gujarati as Gitadhwani (1933). During his imprisonment in 1942, he co-translated Perry Burgess' Who Walk Alone as Manavi Khandiyero (1946) with Kaka Kalelkar.

His associate Narhari Parikh has written his biography Shreyarthini Sadhana (1953).

== See also ==
- List of Gujarati-language writers
