= Gunwant Desai =

Indian cricketer

Personal information
- Born: 30 January 1941 (age 85); Hariya, near Atul, Bombay Presidency, British India (now Gujarat, India)
- Role: Opening bowler

Domestic team information
- Years: Team
- 1968–69 to 1974–75: Railways

Career statistics
| Competition | First-class |
|---|---|
| Matches | 18 |
| Runs scored | 115 |
| Batting average | 7.66 |
| 100s/50s | 0/0 |
| Top score | 29 |
| Balls bowled | 2989 |
| Wickets | 86 |
| Bowling average | 13.34 |
| 5 wickets in innings | 6 |
| 10 wickets in match | 2 |
| Best bowling | 8/54 |
| Catches/stumpings | 7/– |
- Source: ESPNcricinfo, 28 March 2018

Gunwant Desai (born 30 January 1941) is an Indian former cricketer who played first-class cricket for Railways in India from 1968 to 1974.

Desai was a highly effective opening bowler for Railways in the Ranji Trophy, averaging nearly five wickets a match at a very low bowling average and with a strike-rate of a wicket every 34.75 balls. He took 12 wickets in the match (7 for 46 and 5 for 24) in the innings victory over Haryana in 1971–72.

In 1974–75 Desai set a Railways record for match figures that still stands when he took 13 for 77 (8 for 54 and 5 for 23) in another innings victory, this time over Services. He also made his highest score in the same match when, batting as usual at number 11, he made 29 in a tenth-wicket stand of 30.

Desai was never selected to play for North Zone in the Duleep Trophy. He twice played in Ranji Trophy quarter-finals, each time against Rajasthan. The second time, in 1973–74, he felled the Test batsman Salim Durani with a bouncer, and Durani had to be taken to hospital for an operation and played no further part in the match. Rajasthan won narrowly on their first-innings lead. Railways were 241 for 9 when Desai went to the crease, needing 15 for the lead, but he was bowled for a duck.
