= Kevit Desai =

Kenyan civil servant and politician

Dr Kevit Subash Desai CBS
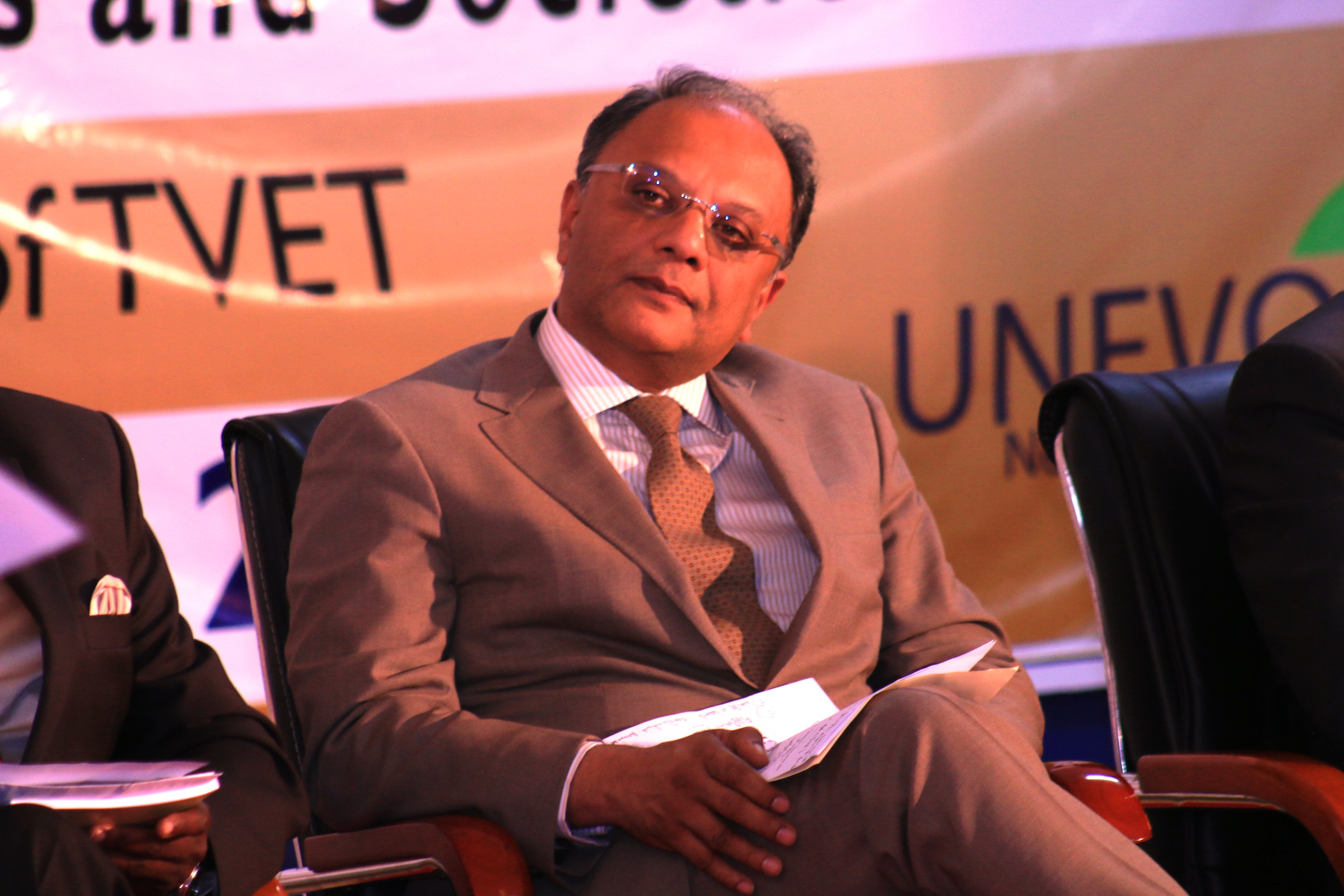
- Born: Nairobi, Kenya
- Employer: Government Of Kenya
- Organization(s): Ministry Of Education State Department of Vocational and Technical Training
- Known for: Concours D'elegance and TVET

Kevit Subash Desai is the Principal Secretary (PS) in the State Department of East Africa Community (EAC) in the Ministry of East Africa Community and Regional Development. Previously PS of Ministry of education, state department of Vocational and Technical Education (TVET) in the Ministry of Education, Science and Technology of Kenya. Prior to this appointment, Desai was the managing director of Centurion Systems Kenya Limited, a company that deals with industrial automation and control systems. Desai holds a PhD in Robotics Systems Engineering from Shibaura Institute of Technology (Japan) and Bachelor of Science in Computer Engineering, from University of North London. Desai has also served as an Industrial Automation Development Engineer at Nippon ABS Ltd.

== Personal life ==
Kevit Desai is a fan of classic and vintage cars and is a patron on the African Concours D'elegance
