= Patidar =

Indian agriculturist caste

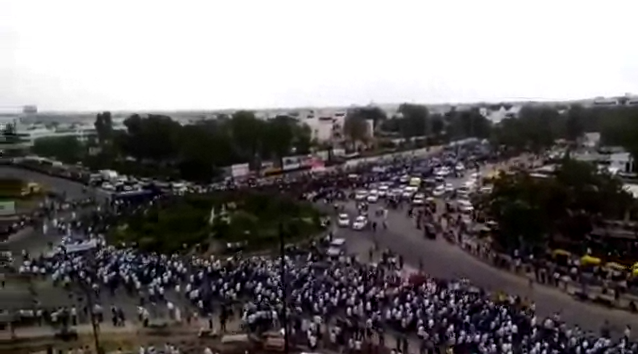
- Patidar reservation agitation
- Religions: Hinduism
- Languages: Gujarati
- Region: Principally in Gujarat, but also some other states of India

Patidar (Gujarati: Pāṭīdār), formerly known as Kanbi (Gujarati: Kaṇabī), is an Indian land-owning and peasant caste and community native to Gujarat. The community comprises multiple sub-castes, most prominently the Levas and Kadvas. They form one of the dominant castes in Gujarat. The title of Patidar originally conferred to the land owning aristocratic class of Gujarati Kanbis; however, it was later applied en masse to the entirety of the Kanbi population who lay claim to a land owning identity, partly as a result of land reforms during the British Raj.

According to 2011 Socio Economic and Caste Census their population is approximately 1.5 crores and they form 21.7% of Gujarat's population.

== History ==
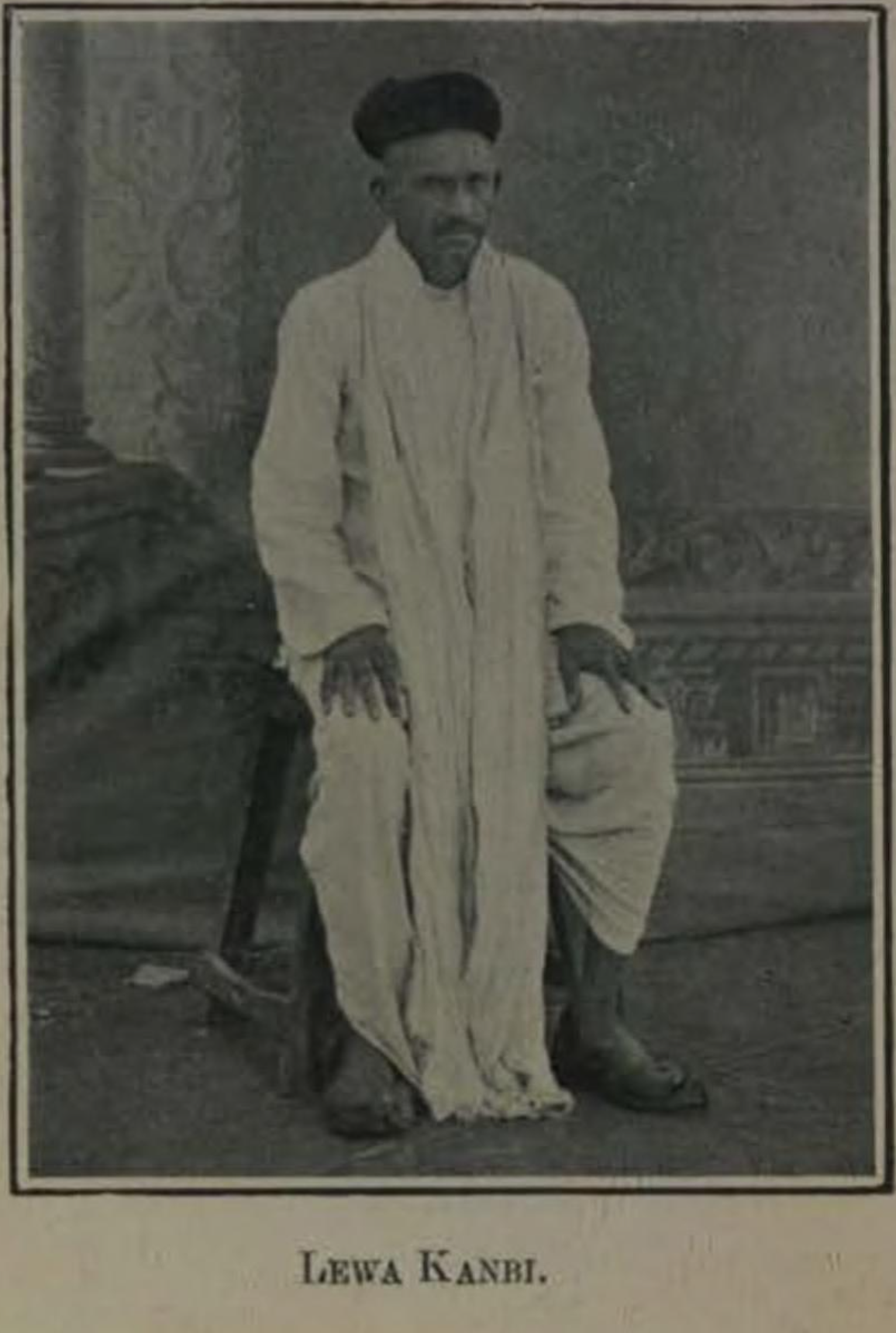
A Lewa Kanbi from Baroda State

The Kanbi/Patidars are divided into several subcastes. The Levas are from central Gujarat and the Kadavas are from northern Gujarat. The Matis, who are a sub-subcaste of the Levas, live in southern Gujarat. The Chullias live in certain areas of Saurashtra. The Bhaktas form another subcaste. The Anjana Kanbis are similar to Rajputs, and eat meat and drink alcohol. The Uda Kanbis are followers of Udabhagat, a neo-Vaishnav saint. The Matiyas, also known as Piranas are Kanbis who descend from converts to the Islamic sect of the Imam Shah in the 15th century. These Kanbis were ostracised and moved to Kutch district. Later some of these Kanbis were in turn converted to the Swaminarayan sect by Narayan Mistri. The Levas and Kadvas are considered superior to the other subcastes, with the most prestigious section living in Charotar. These two sections inter-dine but do not inter-marry.

Since the 17th century, the Leva Kanbis controlled the majority of the land in the Kheda district through a coparcenary system of land tenure called narwadari in which Levas would share the payments of revenue owed to the government. They did this to protect their community against exploitations by the government.

The Patidar were originally a title for the Kanbis who had become village tax collectors under the Mughal Empire, and later the Maratha Empire. These Kanbis also took the titles of Desai, Amin and Patel. The Kanbis were a group of western Indian peasant farmers that had various subclans, for example in the central Deccan the Maratha Kanbis and in Gujarat the-then elite Patidar Kanbis.

The rise to socio-economic prominence of the Kanbi community in Gujarat and its change of identity to that of Patidar can be attributed to the land reforms of the British Raj period. (Note: Crispin Bates has stated a date of 1815 for the beginning of British land revenue reforms in Kheda district, which places the changes in the pre-Raj period when the East India Company administered the area.) The Raj administrators sought to assure revenue from the highly fertile lands of central Gujarat by instituting reforms that fundamentally changed the relationship between the two communities of the region, the peasant Kanbi and the warrior Kolis. The two had previously been of more or less equal socio-economic standing, but the land reforms better suited the agricultural peasantry than the warriors.

Governments in India had always relied on revenue from land as their major source of income. With the decline of the Mughal Empire, the extant administrative systems fell apart and anarchy prevailed. The British colonisation of the country took place over a period of many years and had to adapt to the various local land tenure arrangements that had arisen as Mughal power waned. These systems of ownership could be broadly classified as landlord-based (zamindari, vanta or magulzari), village-based (mahalwari, narva) and individually based (ryotwari).

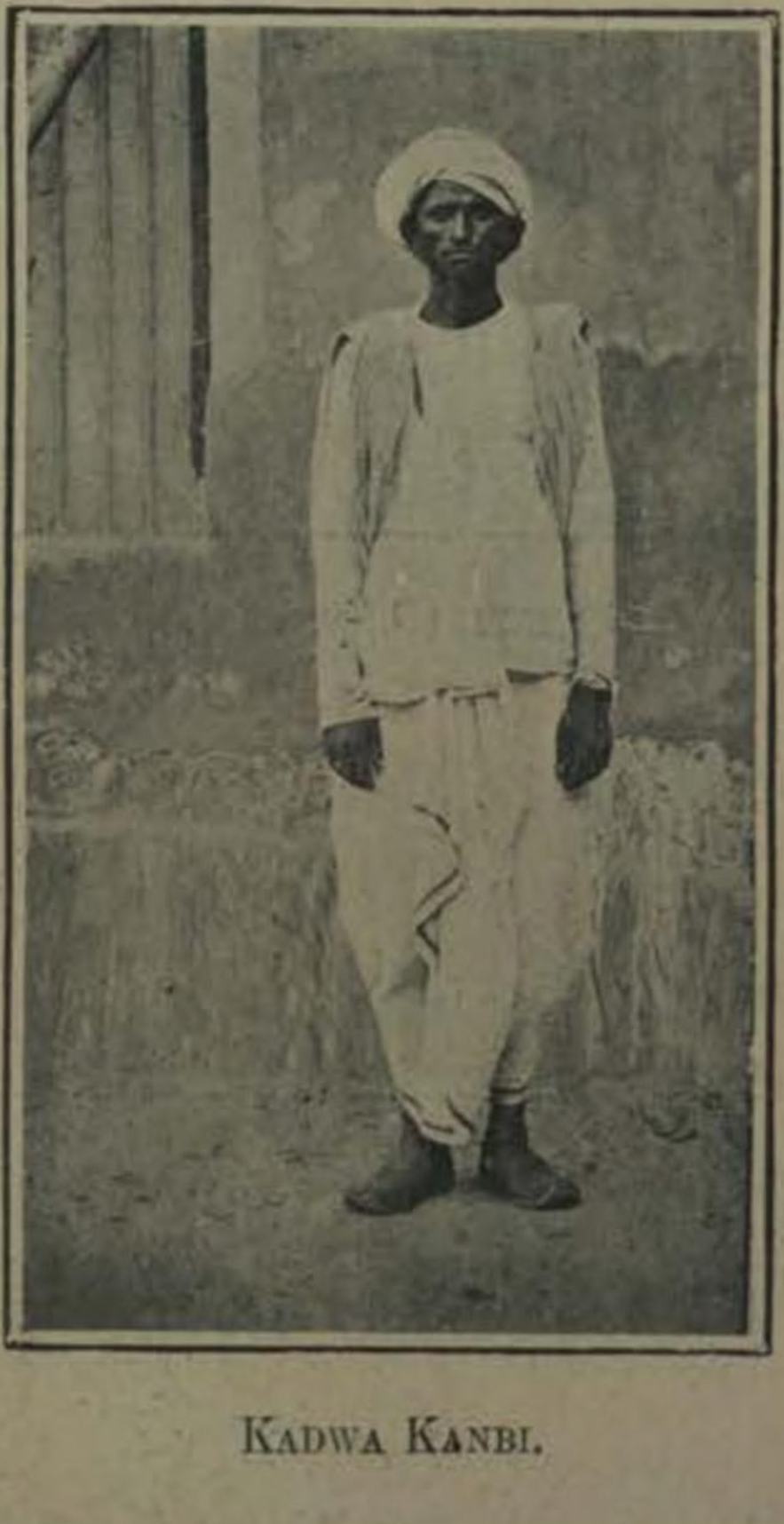
A Kadwa Kanbi from Baroda State

In Gujarat, the British administrators found that all three systems existed. The Kanbis tended to adopt the village-based model and the Kolis the landlord-based variant. The village-based system entailed that organisations jointly owned a village and shared responsibility in some fixed proportion for the land revenues. The division of responsibility might be arranged by the amount of land held by each member (the bhaiachara method) or by ancestry (the pattidari system). Working with this village model enabled the British to impose a fixed revenue demand that was payable whether or not the land was cultivated and that gave landholders the right to sublet and otherwise manage their lands with minimal official interference. It simplified revenue collection and maximised income when compared to a system based on individual responsibility for revenue, in which allowances had to be made for land being out of cultivation. It also allowed a degree of communal self-determination that permitted the rise of economic elites with no reason to engage in political challenges, and hence the rise of the communities then known as Kanbis. Some Kanbis became wealthy enough to enter the world of finance, providing lines of credit to others in their community.

The situation experienced by the Gujarati Kolis, with their preferred landlord-based tenure system, was not so mutually beneficial. They were subject to interference from the British revenue collectors, who intervened to ensure that the stipulated revenue was remitted to the government before any surplus went to the landlord. Being less inclined to take an active role in agriculture personally and thus maximise revenues from their landholdings, the Koli possessions were often left uncultivated or underused. These lands were gradually taken over by Kanbi cultivators, while the Kolis became classified as a criminal tribe due to their failure to meet the revenue demands and their tendency to raid Kanbi villages to survive. The Kanbi land takeovers also reduced the Kolis to being the tenants and agricultural labourers of Kanbis rather than landowners, thus increasing the economic inequality between the communities. The difference was further exacerbated by the Kanbis' providing better tenancy arrangements for members of their own community than for Kolis.

In the 18th century, Kanbis were also mentioned as working as weavers at Surat. In the 1740s, some Kanbis were granted permission by the governor, Safdar Khan, to manufacture Saris, which traditionally was the domain of Khatris. The Kunbis had learned the art of weaving from the Khatris who had employed them. The Khatris were annoyed by this, and a rivalry developed between the castes, which disrupted the business of the East India Company. This led the company to persuade the Nawab to revoke the Kunbi's license to weave saris in 1800, and guarantee to the Khatris the sole license to manufacture saris, on the condition that they would only work for the East India Company.

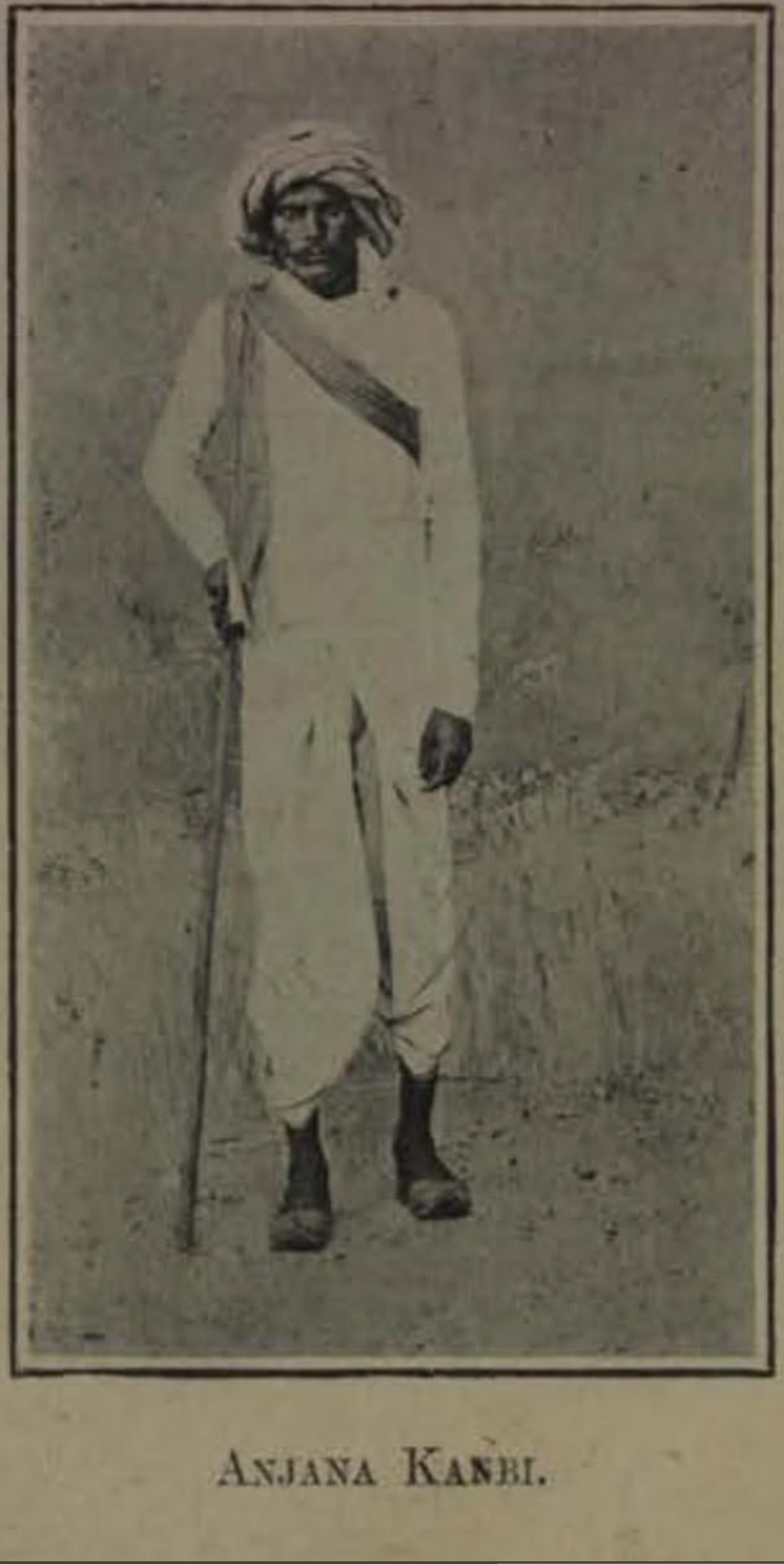
An Anjana Kanbi from Baroda State

The Kanbis' economic well-being was enhanced further from the 1860s due to improvements in crop selection, farming methods and transportation. They began to diversify their business interests and some with higher status also replaced the field labour of their families – especially the women – with hired labour in an attempt to emulate the Bania communities, who had Vaishya status in the varna ranking system. The Kanbis had been of the low caste Shudra rank. (Note: The varna system comprises Brahmins, Kshatriyas, Vaishyas and Shudras, with those unclassified being untouchables. Broadly speaking, Vaishyas were business people involved in moneylending, trading and similar activities, while Shudras were manual workers.)

The Kanbis also claimed equal status with the Rajputs, who had formerly been the dominant caste in the region. The Rajputs, who claimed to be Kshatriyas, lost their landownership to the Kanbis, and were forced to become their tenants. The Kanbis also claimed Kshatriya status, mirroring the Rajputs. The Kanbis/Patidars mirrored the Rajputs in that they both claimed to be of Kshatriya status, hired genealogists to fabricate genealogies, and hired bards to concoct warrior legends about their pasts. Traditionally the bards and Brahmins had maintained that the Kanbis had always been farmers, but in 1912 the Kanbis published Origin and History of Kanbi Kshatriya in Gujarati, attempting to link the Kanbis with the Ikshvaku clan of Kshatriyas. According to Jyotindra Jain, the Kanbis have never ruled any territory except the estates of Patadi, Dhasa, Rai, and Sankali.

The Patidars began trading indigo in the 19th century.

The Patidars heavily benefited from the British Raj, and were able to use their land drainage systems, better agriculture, and the growth of a money economy to prosper. The growth of Ahmedabad during the British Raj gave the Patidars a market to sell goods.

In the 19th century due to the declining profitability of agriculture, many Kanbis took advantage of new opportunities afforded by British rule, with many migrating to towns like Ahmedabad and Cambay where they became weavers, traders, and moneylenders.

In 1891, around ten percent of Leva and Kadva Kanbis were literate.

The Kadvas used to have a unique marriage custom in which marriages were only conducted once every ten years. This marriage custom was noted to be in decline by 1911. In 1922, the Kadva Seva Mandal organized a caste conference which abolished the deccenial marriage custom.

== Reinventing identity ==
The parcels of land held under the village tenureship system are known as patis and a patidar is the holder of one of those allotments. During the 19th century, the Kanbis generally adopted the Patidar term to describe themselves and thus emphasise the high status associated with their ownership. The community also adopted the surname Patel, which was traditionally applied to village headmen.

During this time, the Kanbis and Patidars were socially stratified. The "authentic" Patidars were those who were the dominant landowners. They owned large estates and supervised cultivation, or leased out land to tenants. The "lesser" Patidars were those who owned less land and cultivated part of their lands themselves. The Kanbis retained their lower status as those who did not own land. The British favoured the "authentic" Patidars over the Rajputs and Kolis, and gave them positions as revenue collectors. The favoured treatment and increased wealth and dominance led the "authentic" Patidars, "lesser" Patidars, and Kanbis to closely associate with each other. Additionally, the development of tobacco as a cash crop and African trade benefited both Patidars and Kanbis and reinforced their unity and prevent them from splitting.

The community also began to redefine itself in the context of the Hindu religion. As well as aspiring to Kshatriya status, they adopted ritually pure practices such as vegetarianism, worship of Krishna rather than mother goddesses (who were given animal sacrifices), prohibiting widow remarriage, giving dowries rather than using the then-prevalent bride price system, and discontinuing patronage of low-caste priests. They also retained some of their local customs, such as a preference for singing vernacular bhakti devotional songs rather than the more Brahmanic Sanskrit variants. However, upper castes never recognised any claim of status above Shudra for the Patidars. The Patidars did not allow Brahmins to exploit them or allow Brahmins to control their lives; in fact, in the Kheda district the Patidars wielded more power than the Brahmins did. However, with many Patidars now being merchants, they later began claiming Vaishya status en masse, to be par with the authentic-Vaishya Banias. They found that claiming the mercantile Vaishya status was much easier and more accessible than claiming the obsolete Kshatriya status. Both Banias and Patidars were able to successfully adapt to modern conditions, whereas castes who traditionally claimed Kshatriya status have not been able to shift as well to modern society. The Patidars claimed to be descendants of the Hindu deity Rama. Specifically, the Patidars claim that the Levas and Kadvas are the descendants of Lava and Kusha, respectively, the two sons of Rama. The Barots record that Lava and Kusha were cursed by their mother Sita to become cultivators, and after which the Patidars supposedly migrated from Ayodhya to Gujarat. Shah and Shroff consider this scenario to be unlikely, and believe it to be an example of Barots creating myths to legitimize caste claims to a particular varna (in this case, Kshatriya).

The Patidars do not wear the sacred thread, and employ any caste of Brahmins to act as their priests.

Pocock notes differences in the behavior of Patidar men of Kheda district when in the fields versus the home. In the village fields the consumption of meat and liquor and sexual relations with untouchable women is possible, but such behavior is strictly forbidden in the house.

The Patidars practised female infanticide until it was outlawed by the British in 1870.

The Patidar practice of hypergamous marriage was also distinct from that of the Kolis, with the former marrying relatively locally and across boundaries within their own community while the latter dispersed over a wide area to marry with Rajputs. The Patidar system caused the creation of endogamous marriage circles based around groups of equal-status villages known as gols, thus strengthening ties. Simultaneously, the system allowed someone from a relatively poor circle to marry hypergamously into one of the fewer, wealthier Patidar families, whose socio-economic status would be diluted unless they adopted such practices because there were insufficient eligible brides. The marriage situation in Gujarat has become so severe in recent years, with such a significant skew of gender, that in the 2010s the Patidar community organisations elsewhere in India have been encouraging some of their number to contract marriages with Gujarati Patidars, and also encouraging some Kurmi-Patidar marriages. The latter they hold to be acceptable because of a belief that, centuries ago, the two castes had a common origin. The numbers involved are at present reported to be very few but it is seen as a significant break with tradition to marry outside the caste and/or outside their home state. They claim that such marriages also develop new business ties.

In 1894, another farmer caste, the Kurmis, formed their own caste association. The Kurmis were a farming caste in the eastern Gangetic plain who, like the Kanbis, were of Shudra status. In an organisation in Awadh, the Kurmis sought to draw the Patidars, Marathas, Kapus, Reddys, and Naidus under the Kurmi umbrella. They then campaigned to have Kurmis recognised as Kshatriyas in the 1901 census.

The Raj administration first recognised the separate caste status of Patidars in the 1931 census of India. In the census, all instances of Kanbi in Gujarat were replaced with Patidar.

The Patidars are estimated to comprise 12–14% of Gujarat's population.

Until the 1950s, Patidar and Brahmin children did not dine with each other or drink from the same glasses in Primary schools in Old Ahmedabad.

In the 1960s, an alliance of Patidars, Brahmins, and Banias controlled Gujarati politics.

In the post-independence era, Patidars along with Brahmins, Rajputs, and Banias formed the upper castes of Ahmedabad.

In 1985, Patidars and Brahmins violently participated in the anti-reservation riots.

They form one of the dominant castes in Gujarat.

In 1990s Surat, Patidars had a declining interest in maintaining caste behaviors, a trend shared by most Hindus. Only a minority of Surati Patidars considered in-caste marriage and vegetarianism as important. A majority regarded membership in the Patidar association, only eating food cooked by Patidars, and maintaining the Patidar caste's position in society as unimportant. In 1990s Kutch, a majority of members considered cremation of the dead within an day and vegetarianism to be important customs, and only a minority considered in-caste marriage to be important.

== Diaspora ==
Patidars starting migrating to the British-controlled East Africa more than century ago. In South Africa during the famine of 1890, many Kanbis became prosperous as labourers and traders. In the 1920s and 1930s, the British favoured Patidars in East Africa as civil servants in the construction of railways.

In recent decades, many from the East African countries as well as from India have moved to countries such as US, UK, and Canada.

Significant immigration from India to the United States started after the landmark Immigration and Nationality Act of 1965, Early immigrants after 1965 were highly educated professionals. Since US immigration laws allow sponsoring immigration of parents, children and particularly siblings on the basis of family reunion, the numbers rapidly swelled in a phenomenon known as "chain migration". Given the Patidar propensity for entrepreneurship and business enterprise, a number of them opened shops and motels. Now in the 21st century over 40% of the hospitality industry in the United States is controlled by Patidars and other Gujaratis. The Patidar samaj, also dominate as franchisees of fast food restaurant chains such as Subway and Dunkin' Donuts, and retail franchises such as 7-Eleven.

== Notable people ==
- Bhoja Bhagat (1785–1850), Hindu saint poet
- Haridas Viharidas Desai (1840–1895), Dewan of Junagadh state
- Vitthalbhai Patel (1873–1933), Indian legislator and political leader
- Buddhisagarsuri, born Bechardas Shivabhai Patel (1874 – 1925), Jain ascetic, philosopher and author
- Narsinhbhai Patel (1874–1945), Indian revolutionary
- Vallabhbhai Patel (1875–1950), Indian politician
- Gopaldas Ambaidas Desai (1887–1951), Indian independence activist
- Kalyanji V. Mehta (1890–1973), Indian politician
- Dada Bhagwan, born Ambalal Muljibhai Patel, (1908–1988), spiritual leader and founder of the Akram Vignan Movement
- Babubhai J. Patel (1911–2002) former Gujarat Chief Minister
- Bhogilal Sandesara (1917–1995), literary critic, scholar and editor
- Pramukh Swami, born Shantilal Patel, (1921–2016) guru of the Bochasanwasi Akshar Purushottam Swaminarayan Sanstha
- Keshubhai Patel (1928–2020), Indian politician
- Chimanbhai Patel (1929–1994), former Gujarat Chief Minister
- Anandiben Patel, Indian politician
- Karsanbhai Patel, Indian industrialist
- Pankaj Patel, Indian industrialist
- Savji Dholakia, Indian diamond businessman
- Hardik Patel, Gujarati politician
