= Shankarlal Banker =

Independence activist and freedom fighter

Shankarlal Ghelabhai Banker (Note: Gujarati: શંકરલાલ ઘેલાભાઈ બૅંકર, romanized: Śaṁkaralāla Ghēlābhāī Bæṁkara) (1889 – 1985) was an Indian independence activist. He was one of the early associates of Mahatma Gandhi.

== Early life and education ==
Shankarlal was born on 27 December 1889 into a Vaishnava Vaniya family in Bombay. He graduated from Elphinstone High School in 1904, received his Bachelor of Arts degree from Wilson College in 1908, and his Master of Arts degree from St. Xavier's College in 1911.

In 1911 he travelled to London, England for four years to learn about the leather trade, but was forced to leave the country early due to the onset of World War I. Despite being raised as a vegetarian Vaishnava, when he was in Great Britain he ate meat. Upon returning to India he refused to perform the prayashchitta ceremony demanded by his caste, which led to his family's expulsion by the caste council. Despite this, he and his family were accepted back into the community by the caste at large.

During his education, he read Dayanand Saraswati's Satyarth Prakash, following which he became opposed to idol worship. He also became a member of the Prarthana Samaj, through which he also sought the uplift of Bombay's depressed classes. When the Bombay Home Rule League was established in 1916, Shankarlal became one of its ministers.

== Career ==
Banker and his friend Indulal Yagnik had established Young India and Navjivan publications respectively. They had handed over these publications to Mahatma Gandhi when he entered public life in India. He was one of the early associates of Gandhi.

On 10 March 1922, Gandhi and Banker, as publisher and editor of Gandhi's newspaper Young India, were accused of treason and arrested. Both Banker and Gandhi pleaded guilty and the trial was set for 18 March. It was held at the Circuit House and many leading Congressmen like Jawaharlal Nehru, Sarojini Naidu and Madan Mohan Malaviya attended. Judge C. N. Broomfield delivered his judgement and Banker was sentenced to a year and a half in jail.

Banker had played a major role in Gandhi's activities in Ahmedabad. He participated in the textile mill workers’ strike in Ahmedabad, the 1918 Kheda Satyagraha and the protests against the Rowlatt Act. He was the secretary of the Bharatiya Charkha Sangh which promoted khadi and Charkha.
