= Salil Desai =

Indian novelist

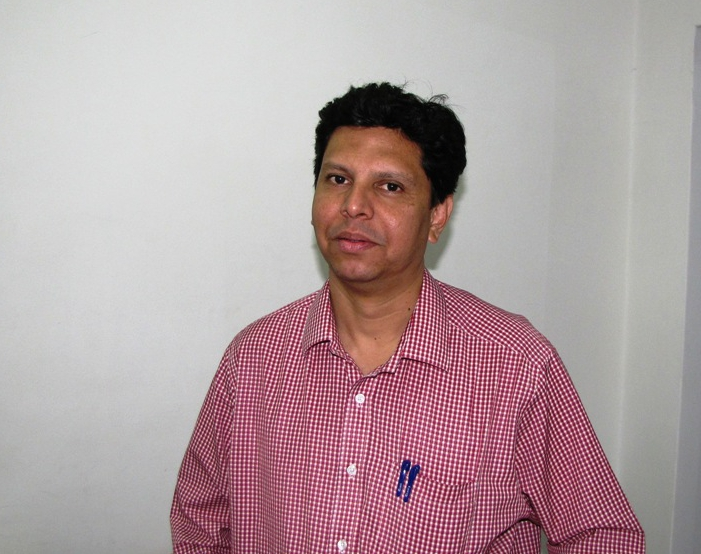
Salil Desai

Salil Desai is an Indian novelist who writes murder mysteries based in Pune, India. His debut novel, The Body in the Back Seat, which was published in May 2011, was acclaimed as "the best murder mystery by an Indian author so far" by The Tribune. An alumnus of FTII, and a former journalist, he has also produced films, held creative writing workshops and written a number of short stories.

His crime thriller ‘The Sane Psychopath’ was inspired by a real-life incident and the author created a narrative about how a soft-spoken and mild-mannered bus driver called Shankar Lande goes on an hour-long mindless rampage in Pune, killing ten people, injuring 70 and almost wrecking a hundred other vehicles.

== List of works ==
- The Body in the Back Seat. Pune: Gyaana Books. 10 November 2011. p. 254. ISBN 978-8190939157. (2011).
- Murder on a Side Street. Pune: Unicorn Books. 6 March 2012. p. 224. ASIN B007I6JPPK. (2012).
- Lost Libido and Other Gulp Fiction. Pune: Fingerprint. 21 November 2012. p. 288. ASIN B00ABF8DXU. (2012).
- The Murder of Sonia Raikkonen. Pune: Fingerprint Publishing. 22 October 2015. p. 282. ASIN B01727HP9W. (2015)
- Killing Ashish Karve. Pune: Fingerprint!. 15 October 2015. p. 230. ASIN B016QVTON0.
- 3 And A Half Murders. Pune: Fingerprint! Publishing. 8 February 2017. p. 328. ISBN 978-8175994256.
- Anthologies in which stories have appeared -
  - Stories at the Coffee Table (Caferati).
  - The Shrinking Woman and Other Stories (Unisun).
  - Chicken Soup for the Indian Teenage Soul (Westland).
  - Vanilla Desires (Unisun). volume 1
  - Chicken Soup for the Indian College Soul (Westland).
  - The Killer App and Other Stories (Penguin).
