= Lonari =

Indian caste

The Lonari caste primarily resides in various regions of India such as Bhusawal, Jalgaon, Dhule, Surat, Ahmednagar, Aurangabad, Khandesh, Nasik, Satana, Pune, Baramati, Indapur, Sangli, Satara, Solapur, Jalna, the Satara agency, and the southern Maratha country. In 1901, their population was recorded at 19,222 individuals, with 9,672 males and 9,550 females. Originally engaged in cement-making and lime-burning activities, they were initially considered to be part of the Maratha community but later established themselves as a distinct group by specializing in lime and charcoal production and trade. The Lonari community did not have any caste reservations initially and were classified under the General category; however, they were granted Other Backward Class (OBC) status in Maharashtra during the mid-1990s.

In Belgaum district, Lonaris are further divided into Mith (Salt) and Chuna (Lime). In districts like Ahmednagar, Pune, and Solapur, they are categorized as Lonari proper and Kadu, Akaramashe. While Lonaris predominantly identify as Marathas, some political influences and strong leadership led them to opt for OBC status when it was officially granted. Lonari individuals are spread across various states in India such as Karnataka, Madhya Pradesh, Gujarat, Vidarbha, but their origins can be traced back to Maharashtra from ancient times.

Lonari surnames include Goralkar, Khot, Kalel, Dangal (डांगल), Dhage, Dhumal, Lagad, Tulaskar, Gite, Ajage, Rane, Yedave, Kurhe, Ingale, Unde, More, Nimgire, Chorghe, Donhe, Dhangekar, Sodmise, Harge, khatte, Dhembre, Rakshe, Limite, Bondre, Karche, Tambe, Zadge, Kolarkar, Holkar, Kanade, Karande, Dhokrat, Atpalkar, Milke, Ganganmale, Gudale, Awate, Gherade, Singrore, Mutekar, etc.

There are castes and sub-castes present in states, each with its own history, traditions, and social dynamics having synonymous names but are of same caste or occupation marry only among their sub-caste or subgroup such as below:

Name of the State	Synonymous Names
Andhra Pradesh	Uppara, Sagara, Memar, Beldar
Karnataka	Uppara, Sagar, Goundi, Ager, Koosa, Uppalinga, Uppaligashetty, Beldar, Lonmali, Lonkar, Lonaria
Kerala	Alvan, Koosa, Upparam
Tamil Nadu	Uppara, Uppaliyan, Uppaliya Naicker Alavan, Padh, Padti, Uppaliya, Sagar
Telangana	Uppara, Sagara, Memar, Beldar, Uppilga
Bihar	Noniya, Ninia, Lonia, Lonia, Beldar, Sorgar Gola, Goli, Luniyar, Chauhan
Orissa	Uppara, Noliya, Launa, Noniya, Loniya
West Bengal	Noniya, Nuniya, Lawaniya
Jharkhand	Namkgar, Noniya, Narare, Beldar, Chauhan
Chhattisgarh	Nuniya, Sorgar, Nungar
Madhya Pradesh	Loniya, Lonia, Noniya, Agri, Lonari Kunbi, Lodhi, Lonari
Uttar Pradesh	Loniya, Luniya, Noniya, Ninia, Lodhi, Paramr, Bind, Beldar, Shorgar, Chauhan
Uttarakhand	Agariya
Delhi	Agri, Khanl, Lonari, Loniya, Chauhan
Haryana	Noonagar, Gola, Goli, Sholgar
Rajasthan	Loniya, Silawat, Raj, Shoragar, Karawal, Kharol, Kharwa
Punjab	Noonagar, Uppiliyan, Lawankar
Gujarat	Kadiya, Ager, Agri, Chunar, Beldar, Lonari
Maharashtra	Lonari, Gavandi, Agri, Agera, Jire Gavandis, Kamathi Guvandis, Kadiyas Gavandis, Lonari Kunbi, Lonari, Chauhan

== Exogamous divisions ==
Except in Poona district, persons with the same surname cannot intermarry. The following are some of the exogamous groups in Poona district:

- Goralkar
- Bajbalkar
- Sangolkar
- Narale
- Chorghe
- chadokar
- Yedave
- Labde
- Kanade
- Dhokrat
- Ajage
- Gawand
- hipperakar
- Adhav
- Harage
- Karche
- Kute
- Chale
- Chabre
- Dhangekar
- Bajbalkar
- Dhone
- Harge
- Nimgire
- Vasimkar
- Adne
- Kapse
- Koparkar
- Khilari
- Vagdare
- Soparkar
- Deulkar
- Narale
- Gherade
- Khot
- Khirsagar
- Karande
- Khandekar
- Muthekar
- Navthare
- Shedage
- Thite
- Natkar
- Redekar
- Kasavkar
- Borchate
- Milke
- Langde
- Khilare
- Tone
- Dhage
- Hipparkar
- Gend
- Galve
- Kalel
- Baad
- Iparkar
- Khatte
- karande
- kurhe
- Sanvatsarkar
- Unde
- Sansare
- Atpadkar
- Godase
- Borchate
- Sodmise

Lonaris have been known to keep family records with the 'Bhaats' who are the record keepers in service of the Lonaris. Lord Khandoba of Jejuri is known to be the 'Kul'daivat or the Community deity of the Lonaris. Marriage within the same 'gotra' is not permitted.

== Marriage ceremonies ==
Marriage - Two brothers may marry two sisters. There is no limit of age for marriage of boys. Sexual license before marriage is neither allowed nor tolerated. If a girl commits sexual indiscretions before marriage with a man of her caste, she is married to him. The man is compelled to undergo certain purifications and to pay a fine and give a dinner to his caste-men. They are then classed as Kadu, Akaramashe or Bastard, and treated as being of an inferior division. If a girl commits sexual indiscretions with an outsider, she is excommunicated, and cannot be readmitted into her caste either by paying fine or giving a dinner to her caste-men. Polygamy is permitted, but Polyandry is unknown. A man marries another wife when his first wife is barren or is physically defective.

The offer of marriage generally comes from the boy's father. It is arranged through the mediation of four or five men of their caste, termed Pudhait. A Brahman priest fixes an auspicious date for the marriage and also conducts the service. When an offer is received, two men of both the sides go to an astrologer with the bride and bridegroom's horoscopes and have them compared, when the horoscopes not are not available, the marriage is settled by the religious names of the bride and bridegroom. Twenty-seven heaps of rice corresponding to the twenty-seven stars are prepared. Over each heap a betel nut and a pice is placed. Red and turmeric powders are offered to these heaps, and a small girl is asked to pick up a betel nut. From the number of the betel nut, the bridegroom's star is marked. Similarly, the bride's star is marked, and then the astrologer decides whether the proposed match will be happy and prosperous. The principal ceremonies are Kunku-lavne or Betrothal, Lagna-chithi or fixing the date of marriage, turmeric rubbing, Devkarya or the ceremony of enshrining the marriage guardian deity which consists of Panchpavli, i.e. leaves of the Mango, Jambul (Eugenia jambolana), Shami (Prosopis spicigera), Umber (Ficus glomerata), and Rui (Caltropis gigantea), Vardha or taking the bridegroom to the bride's house, Sumant-pujan or the reception of the bridegroom by the bridge's father, Kanyadan or the bride-giving ceremony, Rukhwat or offering food articles to the bridge groom's party. Their marriage ceremonies are similar to those of the Marathas, except that at the time of marriage, the bride and bridegroom are made to stand on the bamboo baskets, or the bride on a grindstone and the bridegroom on a coil of rope. The Saptapadi, or taking seven steps by the bride and bridegroom, or the throwing of rice over the bride and bridegroom's heads, is the binding portion of the ceremony.

Remarriage of a widow is allowed. A widow is not allowed to marry her maternal or paternal aunt's son (cousin by an aunt), maternal uncle's son, or any member of her deceased husband's family. The ceremony takes place during the latter half of any month, or when the moon is not shining. The heads of the caste panchayat, a Brahman priest, and kinsmen of the both sides are present on this occasion. The widow and her new husband are seated on a square which the priest marks out with the grains of wheat. The priest worships a betelnut, Ganpati, and a metal water-pot (Varuna) of which the mouth is covered with betel leaves and a coconut. The Varuna water-pot is applied to the brow of the widow thrice. Sandal-paste, flowers, turmeric and vermilion powders and sweetmeats are laid before the betelnut and the water-pot, the hems of the couples garments are knotted together, and the lap of the widow is filled with rice, coconut, betel and fruit. She bows before the gods, and the priest marks her brow with vermilion, and leaves her. She is unlucky for three days after her remarriage, and must take care that no married women sees her face during that time. The widower gives a feast to his caste-men the next day. A bachelor is not allowed to marry a widow.

Divorce is allowed. A husband can divorce his wife on the ground of incompatibility of temper or when the wife bears a bad character, and the wife can divorce her husband when he is impotent. A divorce deed is passed with the permission of the headman of the caste, by whom the deed is attested. A woman divorced for adultery with a man of her caste is allowed to marry a second time, and the ceremony is conducted in the form of a widow remarriage.

== Religion ==
Lonaris follow the Hindu law of inheritance, and belong to the Varkari, Shiva, Vaishnava sects. You will find a "Vaarkari" in each family of Lonari people as they strongly believe and follow the ethics, values, and culture of Vaarkari traditions that worship Vithoba of Pandharpur and saints like Tukaram, Gadge Baba, Naamdev, Chokamela, and others. They worship all Hindu gods, observe all Hindu fests and feasts, and make pilgrimages to Alandi, Jejuri, Pandharpur, Tulajapur, Benares, etc. Lonari have Koolswami Gods "Clan Gods" like Jyotiba of Kolhapur, Khandoba of Jejuri and Karnataka, Daryaba of Jath region, Sidhoba of Kharsundi, Taaibai, Mhasoba, Vithoba of Pandharpur etc. They also worship animals such as the cobra, bullock, horse, cow, and trees and plants like banyan tree, papal, apta, shami, and sweet basil, and their worship implements and religious and account books. Excluding Ekadashi, or Saturdays and Mondays a sacrifice of a goat is made to Khandoba and is partaken of by the offerer. They worship Hindu saints and make offerings of Khichadi, frankincense, and sweetmeats for their propitiation. When cholera and smallpox are prevalent, they worship the deities Mari and Shtala respectively. They employ Brahamans to conduct their religious ceremonies.

== Death ceremonies ==
They often burn their dead. Persons dying of smallpox and red leprosy are buried. Children who have not cut their teeth are buried. At burial the deceased is put in the earth in a sitting position. The ashes and bones of the dead when burnt are sent to a holy place or are consigned to a river. As soon as a person has died, the body is washed with hot water and is laid on a bamboo bier covered with a new shroud. If the deceased is a woman whose husband is still living, the body is wrapped in a new robe and a bodice, and the brow is marked with turmeric and red powder. Wreaths of flowers are also offered, and the deceased is borne to the burial or burning ground by four men. The chief mourner walks ahead of the bier, taking fire in a porcelain pot. The bier is put down halfway to the burning or burial ground, and a sweet ball and a pice are thrown on the spot. A pyre of cow dung is prepared and the body placed upon it. The chief mourner shaves his mustache and head and bathes. Then he wets his over-garment and squeezes a few drops of water into the dead person's mouth. The chief mourner then ignites the pyre. When it is half burnt, the chief mourner takes a porcelain pot filled with water upon his shoulder and walks thrice round the pyre. At the commencement of each round, a hole is bored in the pot with a pebble. On completing the third round he throws the pot over his back, and striking his mouth with his hand, calls aloud. The relatives of the dead feed the mourners for three days. On the third day the ashes and bones are collected, and cow's urine and dung are sprinkled over the place of burning. Three small porcelain pots are placed in a line from north to south, and on the mouth of each pot a cake is placed. The food most fancied by the deceased is offered, and camphor and frankincense are burnt. This is termed smashanbali. On the tenth day, balls are offered to the dead. A crow must touch one of the balls, otherwise an artificial crow of darbha grass is prepared, and the ball is touched thereby. The relatives of dead then pour sea and water over the life-stone, and it is then thrown into water. This is known as the daspindi ceremony. On the thirteenth day, the caste-men are feasted, and some charity for the propitiation of the dead is distributed. On the fourteenth day, a female or male, according to the sex of the deceased, is feasted, and articles of raw food are given to Brahmans. For one year the same female or male is feasted every month. For the propitiation of ancestors in general, they observe the shradhha ceremony during the latter half of the month of Bhadrapad. When a person has died a violent death and the body is not found, an image of wheat flour representing the deceased is burnt with sticks of plates (Butea frondosa); funeral rites as on an ordinary death occasion are performed.

== Occupation ==
From the probable derivation of the word 'Lonari' (lona – salt) it is likely that the hereditary occupation of the caste was once preparing salt, and Lonaris following that occupying are still found in Belgaum district. Most of them are now cement makers and charcoal burners. They buy lime nodules and burn lime with charcoal and cow-dung cakes in a circular brick kiln.

== Food ==
They eat the flesh of goats and fowls, as well as fish. They drink liquor. They eat pakki and kanchi and drink water and smoke with Marathas, Dhangars and Mali. Food also involves kadhi chawal, dal bhat, sabudana kidhadi, biryani, Mutton curry, coriander vadi,
