= Kudumbi =

Konkani speaking community in Kerala, India

- Classification: Farmers, cultivators
- Religions: Hinduism
- Languages: Konkani
- Populated states: Kerala
- Ethnicity: Kunbis of Goa

The Kudumbi, also referred to as the Kunubis, the Kurumbi, or the Kunbi (Konkani: [kuɽumbiː, kunubiː]), are traditionally a Konkani-speaking farming community residing in Kerala, India.

== History ==
=== Goan legacy ===
According to Goan historian Anant Ramakrishna Dhume, the Kunbi caste are modern descendants of ancient Mundari tribes. He refers to several words of Mundari origin in the Konkani language and also elaborates on the deities worshipped by the ancient tribe, their customs, methods of farming, etc. G. S. Ghurye says that "Kurmi, Kanbi and Kunbi perhaps signify the occupation of the group, viz., that of cultivation, though it is not improbable that the name may of tribal origin."

The Kudumbi were forced to migrate from Goa following religious persecution by the Portuguese during the Goa Inquisition, which sought to suppress Hinduism. The Kudumbis, along with Gouda Saraswat Brahmins, Daivajnas and Vaishya Vanis who wanted to preserve their religious and cultural identity, migrated from Goa along the west coast of India, primarily through sea voyages.

Some of the groups that fled Goa landed in coastal districts of state of Karnataka, that is, the Uttara Kannada, Dakshina Kannada and Udupi districts, and some groups voyaged further to Kerala.

The sociologist Y. R. Rao (2003) conducted fieldwork among the Kudubis from Goa who were living in a region of Karnataka. He studied a wide range of behaviours including those related to their food habits, taboos, language, economy, political organisation, kinship and marriage. He identifies Hinduisation, Sanskritisation and Modernisation as three factors that might influence behavioural changes.

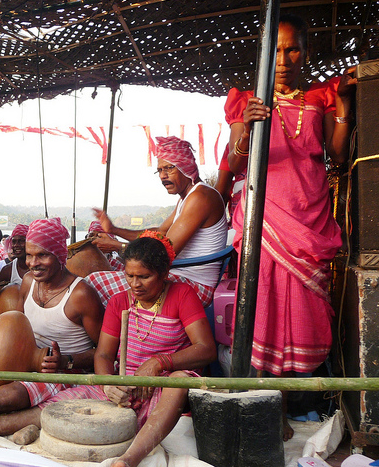
Kunbis of Goa, ladies wearing dethli

=== Current status ===
K. R. Gowri Amma, a prominent figure in the communist movement in Kerala and former Minister, in her autobiography narrates the backwardness of Kudumbi Community as:

In the socio-political and in educational fields, the Kudumbis are backward. Very few of them are educated and officers are scarce. Kudumbi women do not wear a blouse but wrap the sari, sarong wise about them. In 1936, an association of young Kudumbis was established in Cochin and later in Travancore. In 1951, the two associations merged into one. Yet they have not achieved their rightful place in society. They have demanded that they be counted as scheduled castes. In reality their lot is worse than that of the scheduled castes.

V. K. Valath says that the main agricultural labourers in the islands around Kochi have been from the Pulaya and Kudumbi castes. He adds that, whilst many people of the Pulaya and Mukkuvar castes converted to Christianity during the Portuguese period, the Kudumbis retained their traditional religious beliefs.

The community is officially classified as being within the Socially and Economically Backward Communities (SEBC).

== Kudumbi temples ==
Holi, the festival of colours, is celebrated in many Devi temples by the KudumbiThe rituals of the Kudumbi community in Kerala are deeply rooted in their history as migrants from Goa and are most prominently displayed during the Kodungallur Bharani and Holi (Ukuli) festivals. Their traditions often blend ancestor worship, agrarian practices, and intense devotion to Goddess Bhadrakali. Major Festivals and Rituals Kodungallur Bharani (Meenam): Thalappoli: This is a major gathering for the Kudumbi community, held in January at the Kodungallur Sree Kurumba Bhagavathy Temple. Thousands of community members participate in this ritual, which is central to their identity. Kaavu Theendal: While involving many communities, the Kudumbis participate in this "polluting the temple" ritual. It commemorates the victory over the demon Daruka, where devotees (including oracles) run around the temple brandishing sticks and swords, shouting bawdy abuse at the goddess—a practice she is said to accept. Kozhikkallu Moodal: This involves the symbolic or actual sacrifice of roosters to appease the goddess and her fierce attendants. Ukuli (Holi): Manjal Kuli: Celebrated over four days in various Kudumbi temples (like those in Kochi and Thrissur), this "turmeric bath" involves spraying water mixed with turmeric and other natural colours. It is the community's unique version of Holi, brought from Goa. Symbolic Tree Ritual: In some Ernakulam temples, an areca nut tree is felled and carried to the shrine to symbolize Durga’s victory over demons. Crocodile Worship: In parts of Thrissur, a crocodile figure is modelled from mud. This honours a legend that the goddess, as a crocodile, helped the community during their migration to Kerala. Community Rituals: Fugudo Dance: A traditional folk dance form specific to the Kudumbi community, often performed during temple festivities and cultural gatherings. Ancestor & Local Deities: Kudumbis often worship local deities like Neechan, Arukula, and Karimkutty. Primitive rituals and animal sacrifices (now mostly restricted to roosters) continue at smaller, older shrines. .

== See also ==
- Gauda and Kunbi
- Devendrakula Velalar
