= Leva Patel =

Sub-caste of Patidar caste

Leva Patidar
- Populated states: Gujarat, Madhya Pradesh, Rajasthan, Maharashtra
- Subdivisions: Patidar

Leva Patel (Leuva Patidar) is a sub-caste of the Patidar caste in India, located mainly in Charotar region of Gujarat. Compared to other Patidar sub-castes such as the Kadavas, they had greater wealth and control of positions in commerce, education, and producer cooperatives.

== Origin ==
Leva Patels originated from the Katha Vistar Taluka Bhachau Jillo Kutch-Bhuj Gujarat, Kheda district of Gujarat as Shudra. There are a variety of popular legends regarding their origin, such as being migrants from Punjab, migrants fleeing the Kushans, migrants from Ayodhya, or descending from Hunas, Gurjaras. However, these legends are of dubious reliability, and are an example of the invention of tradition. The most popular of these traditions is that Levas descend from Lava, son of the deity Rama in the Hindu epic Ramayana. The Levas claim that their name derives from Lava; however, it actually is a corruption of Reva, the local name for the Narmada River.

In the 19th and 20th centuries, many Leva Patels have immigrated to other countries, like South Africa, the United States, Canada and the United Kingdom. Within India, they have migrated from Gujarat to other states, like Maharashtra, Rajasthan, Andhra Pradesh, West Bengal, and Madhya Pradesh.
