= Narhari Parikh =

Indian writer and activist (1891–1957)

- Born: Narhari Dwarkadas Parikh; 7 October 1891; Ahmedabad, Gujarat
- Died: 15 July 1957 (aged 65); Swaraj Ashram, Bardoli
- Education: Bachelor of Arts; Bachelor of Law
- Occupations: Writer, activist and social reformer
- Spouse: Maniben
- Children: Vanmala (daughter); Mohan (son)
- Writing career
- Language: Gujarati
- Notable works: Manav Arthshastra (1945); Mahadevbhainu Purvacharit (1950)
- Movement: Indian independence movement

Narhari Dwarkadas Parikh was a writer, independence activist and social reformer from Gujarat, India. Influenced by Mahatma Gandhi, he was associated with Gandhian institutes throughout his life. He wrote biographies, edited works by associates and translated some works. His writing also reflected Gandhian influence.

== Biography ==
Parikh was born on 17 October 1891 in Ahmedabad. His family belonged to Kathlal (now in Kheda district). He studied in Ahmedabad and matriculated in 1906. He completed his Bachelor of Arts in History and Economics in 1911 and LL.B. in 1913. He started practicing law with his friend Mahadev Desai in 1914. In 1916, he left his practice and joined Mahatma Gandhi in social reform movements and later the Indian independence movement. He campaigned against untouchability, alcoholism and illiteracy. He also worked for freedom for women, sanitation, health care and schools run by Indians. He was associated with Rashtriya Shala (National School) run by Satyagraha Ashram in 1917. He joined Gujarat Vidyapith in 1920. He also managed Harijan Ashram from 1935. He served as the president of Basic Education Board in 1937. He was also principal of Gramsevak Vidyalaya in 1940. He was secretary of Gandhi for some years. He had also served as the Chairman of Navajivan Trust.

He had stroke of paralysis in 1947 but survived. He died on 15 July 1957 at Swaraj Ashram in Bardoli following paralysis and cardiac arrest.

After death of Gandhi, his ashes were kept at his Haveli in Ahmedabad before being immersed in Sabarmati River.

== Works ==
Parikh wrote some biographies of his associates; Mahadevbhainu Purvacharit (1950) of Mahadev Desai, Sardar Vallabhbhai Part 1-2 (1950, 1952) of Vallabhbhai Patel and Shreyarthini Sadhana (1953) of Kishorlal Mashruwala. Manav Arthshastra (1945) is his work on human economics. His writings on education, politics and Gandhian thought include Samyavad and Sarvoday (1934), Vardha Kelvanino Prayog (1939), Yantrani Maryada (1940). Atlu To Janjo (1922), Karandiyo (1928) and Kanyane Patro (1937, with Mahadev Desai) include his thoughts on education. Kautumbik Arthashastra (1926), Bardolina Kheduto (1927) and Sarvoday Samajni Zankhi discuss contemporary social issues.

He edited Namdar Gokhlena Bhashano (1918), Govindgaman (1923, with Ramnarayan V. Pathak), Navalgranthavali (1937), Mahadevbhaini Diary Part 1–7 (1948–50), Sardar Vallabhbhaina Bhashano (1949), Di. Ba. Ambalal Sakarlalna Bhashano (1949), Gandhijinu Geetashikshan (1956).

He co-translated some works of Rabindranath Tagore with Mahadev Desai such as Chitrangada (1916), Viday Abhishap (1920), Prachin Sahitya (1922). He also translated some works of Leo Tolstoy; Jate Majuri Karnaraone (1924) and Tyare Karishu Shu? (1925–26, with Rang Avadhoot).

== Personal life ==
Parikh married Maniben and they had a daughter Vanmala and a son Mohan (born 24 August 1922). Vanmala Parikh wrote biography of Kasturba Gandhi, Amara Ba (1945), with Sushila Nayyar, an Indian physician, Gandhian and politician.

== See also ==
- List of Gujarati-language writers
