= Gandhism =

Body of ideas inspired by Mahatma Gandhi

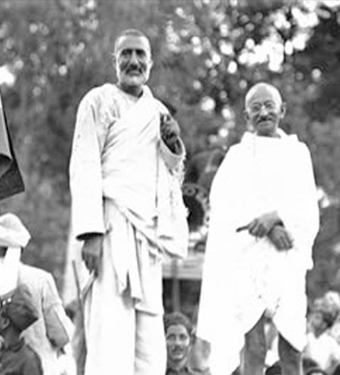
Khan Abdul Ghaffar Khan (left) of the Khudai Khidmatgars and Mohandas 'Mahatma' Gandhi (right) of the Indian National Congress

Gandhism, also referred to as Gandhianism, is a body of ideas that describes the inspiration, vision, and the life work of Mohandas K. Gandhi (alternatively known as Mahatma Gandhi). It is particularly associated with his contributions to the idea of nonviolent resistance, sometimes also called civil resistance or civil disobedience.

The term "Gandhism" also encompasses what Gandhi's ideas, words, and actions mean to people around the world and how they used them for guidance in building their own future. Gandhism also permeates into the realm of the individual human being, non-political and non-social. A Gandhian can mean either an individual who follows, or a specific philosophy which is attributed to, Gandhism.

However, Gandhi did not approve of the term "Gandhism". As he explained:

There is no such thing as "Gandhism" and I do not want to leave any sect after me. I do not claim to have originated any new principle or doctrine. I have simply tried in my own way to apply the eternal truths to our daily life and problems...The opinions I have formed and the conclusions I have arrived at are not final. I may change them tomorrow. I have nothing new to teach the world. Truth and non-violence are as old as the hills.

In the absence of a "Gandhism" approved by Gandhi himself, there is a school of thought that one has to derive what Gandhism stands for, from his life and works. One such deduction is a philosophy based on "truth" and "non-violence" in the following sense. First, one should acknowledge and accept the truth that people are different at all levels ("truth"). Second, one should never resort to violence to settle inherent differences between human beings at any level: from between two people to two nations to two races or two religions ("non-violence").

== Antecedents ==
Although Gandhi's thought is unique in its own right, it is not without ideological parents. Gandhi has in his own writings specified the inspiration for his saying certain things. It can be said that it is his exposure to the West, during his time in London, that compelled him to look at his position on various religious, social, and political affairs.

Soon after his arrival in London, he came under the influence of Henry Stephens Salt, who was not yet the famous campaigner and social reformer that he would later become. Salt's first work, A Plea for Vegetarianism turned Gandhi towards the question of vegetarianism and food habits. It was also around this time that Gandhi joined vegetarian societies in London. Salt eventually became Gandhi's friend too. Talking of the significance of Salt's work, historian Ramachandra Guha said in his work Gandhi before India: "For our visiting Indian, however, the Vegetarian Society was a shelter that saved him. The young Gandhi had little interest in the two great popular passions of late nineteenth-century London, the theatre and sport. Imperial and socialist politics left him cold. However, in the weekly meetings of the vegetarians of London he found a cause, and his first English friends." Salt's work allowed Gandhi for the first time to take part in collective action. Salt later went on to write a biography of Henry David Thoreau, who had a profound impact on Gandhi. Although Thoreau's 1854 book Walden could as well have moved Gandhi, it was his 1849 essay Civil Disobedience that was of greater importance. Gandhi was already in the midst of a form of civil disobedience in South Africa when he read Thoreau. Not only did he adopt the name for the kind of struggle that he would become a champion of, but also adopted the means of breaking laws in order to call for their reform. In 1907, Thoreau's name first appeared in the journal that Gandhi was then editing, Indian Opinion, where Gandhi called Thoreau's logic 'incisive' and 'unanswerable'.

Gandhi's residence in South Africa itself sought inspiration from another Western literary figure—Leo Tolstoy. Leo Tolstoy's critique of institutional Christianity and faith in the love of the spirit greatly moved him. He would after becoming a popular political activist write the foreword to Tolstoy's essay, A letter to a Hindu. Gandhi exchanged letters with Tolstoy and named his ashram Tolstoy Farm. In Gandhian thought, Tolstoy's 1894 book The Kingdom of God Is Within You sits alongside A plea and Civil Disobedience.

Tolstoy Farm was Gandhi's experiment of his utopian political economy—later to be called 'Gram Swaraj'. One key source of this concept was John Ruskin's 1862 book Unto This Last in which Ruskin critiques the 'economic man' (this was written after Ruskin's retreat from Art criticism for which he was well-known). Gandhi tried in all his Ashrams a system of self-sufficiency and decentralised economies. Gandhi was gifted this book by his close associate Henry Polak in South Africa. The philosophy of Ruskin urged Gandhi to translate this work into Gujarati.

In Indian Opinion there is mention of Giuseppe Mazzini, Edward Carpenter, Sir Henry Maine, and Helena Blavatsky. Gandhi's first exploration of pluralism can be said to have begun with his association with the Jain guru near home, Raychandbhai Mehta.

== Satyagraha ==
Satyagraha is formed by two Sanskrit words Satya (truth) and Agraha (seek/desire). The term was popularised during the Indian Independence Movement, and is used in many Indian languages including Hindi.

=== Satya ===
The pivotal and defining element of Gandhism is satya, a Sanskrit word for truth. It also refers to a virtue in Indian religions, referring to being truthful in one's thought, speech and action. Satya is also called as truth.

Gandhi said:- "The truth is far more powerful than any weapon of mass destruction."

== Pacifism and Ahimsa ==
The concept of nonviolence (ahimsa) and nonviolent resistance has a long history in Indian religious thought and has had many revivals in Christian, Buddhist, Hindu, Muslim, and Jain contexts. Gandhi explains his philosophy and way of life in his autobiography, The Story of My Experiments with Truth. He was quoted as saying that:

"What difference does it make to the dead, the orphans, and the homeless, whether the mad destruction is wrought under the name of totalitarianism or the holy name of liberty and democracy?"

"It has always been easier to destroy than to create".

"There are many causes that I am prepared to die for but no causes that I am prepared to kill for".

In 1918, Mahatma Gandhi issued two public appeals for Indians to enlist in the British Indian Army to fight in the First World War. He asserted that fighting in the war would provide Indians necessary self-defense skills that had been eroded by the deep-seated influence of India's ascetic culture, which he disdained.

This advocacy of violence led some of his staunchest supporters, including his nephew, Maganlal Gandhi, to question whether Gandhi was forsaking his non-violent ideals. In a July 1918 letter replying to his nephew, Gandhi stated that any conception of non-violence that prohibited self-defense was erroneous. To support this argument, Gandhi criticized the ethics of love and absolute ahimsa (non-violence) he observed in the teachings of Swaminarayan and Vallabhacharya. According to Gandhi, this love was mere "sentimentalism", and its concomitant absolute ahimsa "robbed us of our manliness" and "made the people incapable of self-defence". Gandhi wrote that Swaminarayan and Vallabhacharya had not grasped the essence of non-violence. Instead Gandhi argued for a non-violence that would "permit [our offspring] to commit violence, to use their strength to fight", since that capacity for violence could be used for the benefit of society, like in "restraining a drunkard from doing evil" or "killing a dog…infected with rabies".

By 1924, however, Gandhi's criticism of Swaminarayan and his ethical teachings had turned into admiration. While arguing in a Navjivan newspaper editorial that it was a duty to resort to violence for self-defense against Afghani terrorists, Gandhi admitted that he could not personally adopt this approach because he had chosen the path of love even against his enemies. Gandhi explained that, according to the Hindu scriptures, a single such self-controlled person could eradicate violence from the hearts of one's opposition. It was through this power of love that Gandhi asserted, "what was accomplished in Gujarat by one person, Sahajanand [Swaminarayan], could not be accomplished by the power of the State". Moreover, he said that "The Age of Sahajanand has not come to an end. It is only devotion and self-control like his that are wanted". Ultimately, Gandhi said that while he was attempting Swaminarayan's approach himself, he did "not have the strength of heart to act upon" it the way that Swaminarayan had successfully done.

Over time, Gandhi's religious thought showed a further influence of Swaminarayan's teachings, as, by 1930, he had included many hymns composed by Swaminarayan poets in his Ashram Bhajanavali, a book of prayers which were used in his twice-daily prayer service. In his writings, he often drew inspiration from the spiritual teachings of Swaminarayan saint-poets Nishkulanand Swami and Muktanand Swami, the latter being the author of his most frequently used prayer. Indian sociologist and Gandhian contemporary, N. A. Thoothi, had argued by 1935 that Mahatma Gandhi was "most influenced in his inner-most being… by the teachings of the Swaminarayan Sampradaya above all". Thoothi concluded that "most of [Gandhi’s] thought, activities, and even methods of most of the institutions which he has been building up and serving, have the flavor of Swaminarayan, more than that of any other sect of Hinduism".

On 6 July 1940, Gandhi published an article in Harijan which applied these philosophies to the question of British involvement in the Second World War. Homer Jack notes in his reprint of this article, "To Every Briton" (The Gandhi Reader) that, "to Gandhi, all war was wrong, and suddenly it 'came to him like a flash' to appeal to the British to adopt the method of non-violence." In this article, Gandhi stated,

I appeal to every Briton, wherever he may be now, to accept the method of non-violence instead of that of war, for the adjustment of relations between nations and other matters [...] I do not want Britain to be defeated, nor do I want her to be victorious in a trial of brute strength [...] I venture to present you with a nobler and braver way worthier of the bravest soldier. I want you to fight Nazism without arms, or, if I am to maintain military terminology, with non-violent arms. I would like you to lay down the arms you have as being useless for saving you or humanity. You will invite Herr Hitler and Signor Mussolini to take what they want of the countries you call your possessions. Let them take possession of your beautiful island, with your many beautiful buildings. You will give all these but neither your souls, nor your minds. If these gentlemen choose to occupy your homes, you will vacate them. If they do not give you free passage out, you will allow yourself, man, woman, and child, to be slaughtered, but you will refuse to owe allegiance to them [...] my non-violence demands universal love, and you are not a small part of it. It is that love which has prompted my appeal to you.

== Economics ==
Gandhi espoused an economic theory of simple living and self-sufficiency/import substitution, rather than generating exports like Japan and South Korea did. He envisioned a more agrarian India upon independence that would focus on meeting the material needs of its citizenry prior to generating wealth and industrialising.

=== Khadi ===
Gandhi also adopted the clothing style of most Indians in the early 20th century. His adoption of khadi, or homespun cloth, was intended to help eradicate the evils of poverty, as well as social and economic discrimination. It was also aimed as a challenge to the contrast that he saw between most Indians, who were poor and traditional, and the richer classes of educated, liberal-minded Indians who had adopted Western mannerisms, clothing and practices.

The clothing policy was designed as a protest against the economic policies of the colonial government. Ever since the direct establishment of Crown control in 1857, Indians were forced to purchase clothing at artificially inflated prices since the colonial authorities would purchase cotton from Indian mill owners and ship them to Britain, where it was processed into clothing which was shipped back to India. Gandhi targeted foreign-made clothing imports to demonstrate his vision of an independent India which did not rely on foreign influence. He focused on persuading all members of the Indian National Congress to spend some time each day hand-spinning on their charkhas (spinning wheel). In addition to its purpose as an economic campaign, the drive for hand-spinning was an attempt to connect the privileged Indian brahmins and lawyers in Congress with the mass of Indian peasantry.

Many prominent figures of the Indian independence movement, including Motilal Nehru, were persuaded by Gandhi to renounce their Western style-dress in favour of khadi.

== Fasting ==
To Gandhi, fasting was an important method of exerting mental control over base desires. In his autobiography, Gandhi analyses the need to fast to eradicate his desire for delicious, spicy food. He believed that abstention would diminish his sensual faculties, bringing the body increasingly under the mind's absolute control. Gandhi was opposed to the partaking of meat, alcohol, stimulants, salt and most spices, and also eliminated different types of cooking from the food he ate.

Fasting would also put the body through unusual hardship, which Gandhi believed would cleanse the spirit by stimulating the courage to withstand all impulses and pain. Gandhi undertook a "Fast Unto Death" on three notable occasions:

- when he wanted to stop all revolutionary activities after the Chauri Chaura incident of 1922;
- when he feared that the 1932 Communal Award giving separate electorates to Untouchable Hindus would politically divide the Hindu people;
- and in 1947, when he wanted to stop the bloodshed between Hindus and Muslims in Bengal and Delhi.

In all three cases, Gandhi was able to abandon his fast before death. There was some controversy over the 1932 fast, which brought him into conflict with the other great leader B.R. Ambedkar. In the end, Gandhi and Ambedkar both made some concessions to negotiate the Poona Pact, which abandoned the call for separate electorates in turn for voluntary representation and a commitment to abolish untouchability.

Gandhi also used the fasts as a penance, blaming himself for inciting Chauri Chaura and the divisive communal politics of both 1932 and 1947, especially the Partition of India. Gandhi sought to purify his soul and expiate his sins, in what he saw as his role in allowing terrible tragedies to happen. It took a heavy toll on his physical health and often brought him close to death.

== Religion ==
Gandhi described his religious beliefs as being rooted in Hinduism as well and the Bhagavad Gita:

"Hinduism as I know it satisfies my soul, fills my whole being. When doubts haunt me, when disappointments stare me in the face, and when I see not one ray of light on the horizon, I turn to the Bhagavad Gita, and find a verse to comfort me; and I immediately begin to smile in the midst of overwhelming sorrow. My life has been full of tragedies and if they have not left any visible and indelible effect on me, I owe it to the teachings of the Bhagavad Gita".

He professed the philosophy of Hindu Universalism (also see Universalism), which maintains that all religions contain truth and therefore worthy of toleration and respect. It was articulated by Gandhi:

"After long study and experience, I have come to the conclusion that all religions are true all religions have some error in them; all religions are almost as dear to me as my own Hinduism, in as much as all human beings should be as dear to one as one's own close relatives. My own veneration for other faiths is the same as that for my own faith; therefore no thought of conversion is possible."

Gandhi believed that at the core of every religion was truth (satya), non-violence (ahimsa) and the Golden Rule.

Despite his belief in Hinduism, Gandhi was also critical of many of the social practices of Hindus and sought to reform the religion.

"Thus if I could not accept Christianity either as a perfect, or the greatest religion, neither was I then convinced of Hinduism being such. Hindu defects were pressingly visible to me. If untouchability could be a part of Hinduism, it could but be a rotten part or an excrescence. I could not understand the raison d'etre of a multitude of sects and castes. What was the meaning of saying that the Vedas were the inspired Word of God? If they were inspired, why not also the Bible and the Quran? As Christian friends were endeavouring to convert me, so were Muslim friends. Abdullah Sheth had kept on inducing me to study Islam, and of course he had always something to say regarding its beauty".

He then went on to say:

"As soon as we lose the moral basis, we cease to be religious. There is no such thing as religion over-riding morality. Man, for instance, cannot be untruthful, cruel or incontinent and claim to have God on his side."

Gandhi was critical of the hypocrisy in organised religion, rather than the principles on which they were based.

Later in his life when he was asked whether he was a Hindu, he replied:

"Yes I am. I am also a Christian, a Muslim, a Buddhist and a Jew."

Gandhi's religious views are reflected in the hymns his group often sang:

- Vaishnav jan to Call them Vishnava, those who understand the sufferings of others...
- Raghupati Raghava Raja Ram Call him Rama or God or Allah...

== Nehru's India ==
Gandhi was assassinated in 1948, but his teachings and philosophy would play a major role in India's economic and social development and foreign relations for decades to come.

Sarvodaya is a term meaning 'universal uplift' or 'progress of all'. It was coined by Gandhi in 1908 as a title for his translation of John Ruskin's Unto This Last. Later, nonviolence leader Vinoba Bhave used the term to refer to the struggle of post-independence Gandhians to ensure that self-determination and equality reached the masses and the downtrodden. Sarvodaya workers associated with Vinoba, including Jaya Prakash Narayan and Dada Dharmadhikari, undertook various projects aimed at encouraging popular self-organisation during the 1950s and 1960s. Many groups descended from these networks continue to function locally in India today.

The Prime Minister of India, Jawaharlal Nehru, was often considered Gandhi's successor, although he was not religious and often disagreed with Gandhi. He was, however, deeply influenced by Gandhi personally as well as politically, and used his premiership to pursue ideological policies based on Gandhi's principles. In fact, on 15 January 1942, in the AICC session Gandhi openly proclaimed Nehru as his successor.

Nehru's foreign policy was staunchly anti-colonialism and neutral in the Cold War. Nehru backed the independence movement in Tanzania and other African nations, as well as the Civil rights movement in the United States and the anti-apartheid struggle of Nelson Mandela and the African National Congress in South Africa. Nehru refused to align with either the United States or the Soviet Union, and helped found the Non-Aligned Movement.

Nehru also pushed through major legislation that granted legal rights and freedoms to Indian women, and outlawed untouchability and many different kinds of social discrimination, in the face of strong opposition from orthodox Hindus.

Not all of Nehru's policies were Gandhian. Nehru refused to condemn the USSR's 1956–57 invasion of Hungary to put down an anti-communist, popular revolt. Some of his economic policies were criticised for removing the right of property and freedoms from the landowning peasants of Gujarat for whom Gandhi had fought in the early 1920s. India's economic policies under Nehru were highly different from Gandhi's with Nehru following a socialist model. Nehru also brought Goa and Hyderabad into the Indian union through military invasion.

At this point, Gandhi believed in a kind of socialism but one that was very different from Nehru's. In praise of socialism, Gandhi once said, "... socialism is as pure as a crystal. It therefore requires crystal-like means to achieve it." Moreover, Gandhi was conscious of the fact that Nehru's ideology differed from his but did not object to that as he was aware that this was a well-thought-out standpoint. He called this a difference in emphasis, his being on 'means' while Nehru's being on ends.

Nehru's two biggest failures are thought to be: The Partition of India which he described and justified as "a necessary evil" and which would lead to the bloody and deadly Partition riots; and the Sino-Indian War of 1962, though his wartime policy is said to have been influenced by Gandhian pacifism. In this instance, it led to the defeat of the Indian Army against a surprise Chinese invasion. Nehru had neglected the defence budget and disallowed the Army to prepare, which caught the soldiers in India's north eastern frontier off-guard with lack of supplies and reinforcements.

== Freedom ==
Gandhi's deep commitment and disciplined belief in non-violent civil disobedience as a way to oppose forms of oppression or injustice has inspired many subsequent political figures, including Martin Luther King Jr. of the United States, Julius Nyerere of Tanzania, Nelson Mandela and Steve Biko of South Africa, Lech Wałęsa of Poland and Aung San Suu Kyi of Myanmar.

Gandhi's early life work in South Africa between the years 1910 and 1915, for the improved rights of Indian residents living under the white minority South African government inspired the later work of the African National Congress (ANC). From the 1950s, the ANC organised non-violent civil disobedience akin to the campaign advanced by the Indian National Congress under the inspiration of Gandhi between the 1920s and 1940s. ANC activists braved the harsh tactics of the police to protest against the oppressive South African government. Many, especially Mandela, languished for decades in jail, while the world outside was divided in its effort to remove apartheid. Steve Biko, perhaps the most vocal adherent to non-violent civil resistance, was allegedly murdered in 1977 by agents of the government. When the first universal, free elections were held in South Africa in 1994, the ANC was elected and Mandela became president. Mandela made a special visit to India and publicly honoured Gandhi as the man who inspired the freedom struggle of black South Africans. Statues of Gandhi have been erected in Natal, Pretoria and Johannesburg.

Martin Luther King Jr., a young Christian minister and a leader of the civil rights movement seeking the emancipation of African Americans from racial segregation in the American South, and also from economic and social injustice and political disenfranchisement, traveled to India in 1962 to meet Jawaharlal Nehru. The two discussed Gandhi's teachings, and the methodology of organising peaceful resistance. The graphic imagery of black protesters being hounded by police, beaten and brutalised, evoked admiration for King and the protesters across America and the world, and precipitated the 1964 Civil Rights Act.

The non-violent Solidarity movement of Lech Wałęsa of Poland overthrew a Soviet-backed communist government after two decades of peaceful resistance and strikes in 1989, precipitating the downfall of the Soviet Union.

Myanmar's Aung San Suu Kyi was put under house arrest, and her National League for Democracy suppressed in their non-violent quest for democracy and freedom in military-controlled Myanmar. This struggle was inaugurated when the military dismissed the results of the 1991 democratic elections and imposed military rule. She was released in November 2010, when free elections were to be held.

== "Without truth, nothing" ==
Mohandas Gandhi's early life was a series of personal struggles to decipher the truth about life's important issues and discover the true way of living. He admitted in his autobiography to hitting his wife when he was young, and indulging in carnal pleasures out of lust, jealousy and possessiveness, not genuine love. He had eaten meat, smoked a cigarette, and almost visited a hustler. It was only after much personal turmoil and repeated failures that Gandhi developed his philosophy.

Gandhi disliked having a cult following, and was averse to being addressed as Mahatma, claiming that he was not a perfect human being.

In 1942, while he had already condemned Adolf Hitler, Benito Mussolini and the Japanese militarists, Gandhi took on an offensive in civil resistance, called the Quit India Movement.

== Gandhians ==
There have been Muslim Gandhians, such as Abdul Ghaffar Khan, known as the "Frontier Gandhi"; under the influence of Gandhi, he organised the Pathans of the Northwest Frontier as early as 1919 to support the independence movement. Christian Gandhians include the Briton Horace Alexander and civil rights leader Martin Luther King Jr. Jewish Gandhians include Gandhi's close associate Hermann Kallenbach. Atheist Gandhians include Jawaharlal Nehru. Bangladeshi writer, columnist Syed Abul Maksud is a notable Gandhian in Bangladesh.

== Promotion of Gandhian ideas ==
Many committees were formed to promote Gandhian ideas, one such committee was "Committee for the promotion of Gandhiji's teaching and his way of life" in 1957. In its meeting committee recommended to the Ministry of Education to prepare three books incorporating Gandhiji's contribution in important fields one each for primary, secondary and University stage. Ministry of Education was recommended by the committee to celebrate Gandhi week at school level etc. Committee worked hard for collection of work on Mahatma Gandhi and many journals have also been published to promote Gandhian ideas. One of the most well-known is Gandhi Marg, an English-language journal published since 1957 by the Gandhi Peace Foundation.

Harold Dwight Lasswell, a political scientist and communications theorist, defined propaganda as the management of eclectic attitudes by manipulation of significant symbols. Based on this definition of Propaganda, Gandhi made use of significant symbols to drive his ideal of an independent Indian nation.

His ideas, symbolized in propaganda, stated that India was a nation capable of economic self-sufficiency without the British, a unity transcending religion would make for a stronger nation, and that the most effective method of protest was through passive resistance, including non-violence and the principle of satyagraha. In the "Quit India" speeches, Gandhi says "the proposal for the withdrawal of British power is to enable India to play its due part at the present critical juncture. It is not a happy position for a big country like India to be merely helping with money and material obtained willy-nilly from her while the United Nations are conducting the war. We cannot evoke the true spirit of sacrifice and velour, so long as we are not free." On his ideas towards a unified India he said: "Thousands of Mussalmans have told me, that if Hindu-Muslim question was to be solved satisfactorily, it must be done in my lifetime. I should feel flattered at this; but how can I agree to proposal which does not appeal to my reason? Hindu-Muslim unity is not a new thing. Millions of Hindus and Mussalmans have sought after it. I consciously strove for its achievement from my boyhood. While at school, I made it a point to cultivate the friendship of Muslims and Parsi co-students. I believed even at that tender age that the Hindus in India, if they wished to live in peace and amity with the other communities, should assiduously cultivate the virtue of neighbourliness. It did not matter, I felt, if I made no special effort to cultivate the friendship with Hindus, but I must make friends with at least a few Mussalmans. In India too I continued my efforts and left no stone unturned to achieve that unity. It was my life-long aspiration for it that made me offer my fullest co-operation to the Mussalmans in the Khilafat movement. Muslims throughout the country accepted me as their true friend." Gandhi's belief in the effectiveness of passive, non-violent resistance has been quoted as being the "belief that non-violence alone will lead men to do right under all circumstances."

These ideas were symbolized by Gandhi through the use of significant symbols, an important proponent in the acceptance of the ideals he expounded in his speeches and movements. On 3 November 1930, Gandhi gave a speech before the Dandi March which possibly could have been one of Gandhi's last speeches, in which the significant symbol of the march itself demonstrated the exclusively nonviolent struggle to empower a self-sufficient India. Beginning in Ahmedabad and concluding in Dandi, Gujarat, the march saw Gandhi and his supporters directly disobey the Rowlatt Act which imposed taxes on salt production and enforced the colonial monopoly on the salt market.

The Khadi movement, which formed part of the larger swadeshi movement, employed the symbol of burning British-made cloth imports in order to manipulate attitudes towards boycotting British goods and rejecting Western culture and urging the return to ancient, precolonial Indian culture. Gandhi obtained a wheel and engaged his disciples in spinning their own cloth called Khadi; this commitment to hand spinning was an essential element to Gandhi's philosophy and politics.

On 1 December 1948, Gandhi dictated his speech on the eve of the last fast. Using the fast as a form of significant symbolism, he justifies it as "a fast which a votary of non-violence sometimes feels impelled to undertake by way of protest against some wrong done by society, and this he does when as a votary of Ahimsa has no other remedy left. Such an occasion has come my way." This fast was conducted in line with his idea of a nation's communities and religions brought together. Gandhi's fast was only to end when he was satisfied with the reunion of hearts of all the communities brought about without any outside pressure, but from an awakened sense of duty.

== Criticism and controversy ==
Gandhi's rigid ahimsa implies pacifism, and is thus a source of criticism from across the political spectrum.

=== Concept of partition ===
As a rule, Gandhi was opposed to the concept of partition as it contradicted his vision of religious unity. Of the partition of India to create Pakistan, he wrote in Harijan on 6 October 1946:

[The demand for Pakistan] as put forth by the Muslim League is un-Islamic and I have not hesitated to call it sinful. Islam stands for unity and the brotherhood of mankind, not for disrupting the oneness of the human family. Therefore, those who want to divide India into possibly warring groups are enemies alike of India and Islam. They may cut me into pieces but they cannot make me subscribe to something which I consider to be wrong [...] we must not cease to aspire, in spite of [the] wild talk, to befriend all Muslims and hold them fast as prisoners of our love.

However, as Homer Jack notes of Gandhi's long correspondence with Jinnah on the topic of Pakistan: "Although Gandhi was personally opposed to the partition of India, he proposed an agreement [...] which provided that the Congress and the Muslim League would cooperate to attain independence under a provisional government, after which the question of partition would be decided by a plebiscite in the districts having a Muslim majority."

These dual positions on the topic of the partition of India opened Gandhi up to criticism from both Hindus and Muslims. Muhammad Ali Jinnah and his contemporary fellow-travelers condemned Gandhi for undermining Muslim political rights. Vinayak Damodar Savarkar and his allies condemned Gandhi, accusing him of politically appeasing Muslims while turning a blind eye to their atrocities against Hindus, and for allowing the creation of Pakistan (despite having publicly declared that "before partitioning India, my body will have to be cut into two pieces").

His refusal to protest against the execution of Bhagat Singh, Sukhdev, Udham Singh and Rajguru by the colonial government was a source of condemnation and intense anger for many Indians. Economists, such as Jagdish Bhagwati, have criticized Gandhi's ideas of swadeshi.

Of this criticism, Gandhi stated, "There was a time when people listened to me because I showed them how to give fight to the British without arms when they had no arms [...] but today I am told that my non-violence can be of no avail against the Hindu-Moslem riots and, therefore, people should arm themselves for self-defense."

== See also ==
- Ambedkarism
- Civil resistance
- Gandhigiri
- Jackie Robinson
- Martin Luther King Jr.
- Marxism
- Nelson Mandela
- Nonviolent resistance
- Satyagraha
- Tolstoyan movement
- Trusteeship

== Notes ==
- Gandhi today: a report on Mahatma Gandhi's successors, by Mark Shepard. Published by Shepard Publications, 1987. ISBN 0-938497-04-9. Excerpts
