= The Story of My Experiments with Truth =

Autobiography of Mohandas Karamchand Gandhi

- First US edition (1948)
- Author: Mohandas Karamchand Gandhi
- Original title: સત્યના પ્રયોગો અથવા આત્મકથા
- Translator: Mahadev Desai
- Language: Gujarati
- Publication place: India
- ISBN: 81-7229-008-X (India); ISBN 0-8070-5909-9 (United States – authorised edition with foreword by Sissela Bok, Beacon Press 1993 reprint); ISBN 0-486-24593-4 (Dover Publications 1983 reprint of 1948 Public Affairs Press edition)
- Original text: સત્યના પ્રયોગો અથવા આત્મકથા at Gujarati Wikisource
- Translation: The Story of My Experiments with Truth online

The Story of My Experiments with Truth (Gujarati: સત્યના પ્રયોગો અથવા આત્મકથા, satyanā prayogo athavā ātmakathā, lit. 'Experiments of Truth or Autobiography') is the autobiography of Mahatma Gandhi, covering his life from early childhood through to 1921. It was written in weekly installments and published in his journal Navjivan from 1925 to 1929. Its English translation also appeared in installments in his other journal Young India. It was initiated at the insistence of Swami Anand and other close co-workers of Gandhi, who encouraged him to explain the background of his public campaigns. In 1998, the book was designated as one of the "100 Best Spiritual Books of the 20th Century" by a committee of global spiritual and religious authorities.

Starting with his birth and parentage, Gandhi gives reminiscences of childhood, child marriage, relation with his wife and parents, experiences at the school, his study tour to London, efforts to be like the English gentleman, experiments in dietetics, his going to South Africa, his experiences of colour prejudice, his quest for dharma, social work in Africa, return to India, his slow and steady work for political awakening and social activities. The book ends abruptly after a discussion of the Nagpur session of the Indian National Congress in 1915.

== Background ==
In the early 1920s Gandhi led several civil disobedience campaigns. Despite his intention that they be peaceful, on several occasions, incidents of violence broke out. The colonial authorities charged him in 1922 with incitement, and specifically of stirring up hatred against the government, and, the result was a six-year term of imprisonment. He served only two years, being released early on the grounds of ill health. Soon after, in the winter of 1925 at 56, Gandhi began writing his autobiography, on the example set by Swami Anand. He serialized it in his own weekly Navajivan (lit. New Life). The autobiography was completed in February 1929.

== Publication history ==
In the book's preface, Gandhi recalled that he had actually undertaken to sketch out his autobiography as early as 1921 but had to set the work aside due to his political engagements. He took on the labour, he informs us after his fellow workers had expressed a desire that he tell them something about his background and life. Initially he refused to adopt a book format, but then agreed to write it in a serialized form with individual chapters to be published weekly.

The autobiography was written and serialized over the period from 25 November 1925 to 3 February 1929 in 166 installments, which appeared in Navajivan. The corresponding English translations were printed in Young India, and reprinted in Indian Opinion in South Africa, and in the American journal Unity. The Hindi translation was published almost simultaneously in the Hindi edition of Navajivan.

The original English edition of the book consisted of two volumes, the first of which covered parts 1-3, while the second contained parts 4-5.

The original Gujarati version was published as the Satya Na Prayogo (lit. Experiments with Truth), bearing the subtitle, Atmakatha (lit. The Story of a Soul). The English version, An Autobiography, bore the subtitle, Experiments with Truth.

In the preface, Gandhi states:

It is not my purpose to attempt a real autobiography. I simply want to tell the story of my experiments with truth, and as my life consist of nothing but experiments, it is true that the story will take the shape of an autobiography. But I shall not mind if every page of it speaks only of my experiments.

Name of the translator-- { Mahadev Desai }

LANGUAGE-- { Gujarati }

K. Madhavanar, an independence activist and journalist from Kerala, translated the book to Malayalam in 1928. It was serialised in the Mathrubhumi Weekly and later on launched as a book.

The Story of My Experiments with Truth was first published in the United States in 1948 by Public Affairs Press of Washington, D.C.

== Summary ==
=== Translator's preface ===
This section is written by Mahadev Desai who translated the book from Gujarati to English. In this preface Desai notes that the book was originally published in two volumes, the first in 1927 and second in 1929. He also mentions that the original was priced at 1 rupee and had a run of five editions by the time of the writing of his preface. 50,000 copies had been sold in Gujarati but since the English edition was expensive it prevented Indians from purchasing it. Desai notes the need to bring out a cheaper English version. He also mentions that the translation has been revised by an English scholar who did not want his name to be published. Chapters XXIX–XLIII of Part V were translated by Desai's friend and colleague Pyarelal Nayyar.

=== Introduction ===
The introduction is officially written by Gandhi himself mentioning how he has resumed writing his autobiography at the insistence of Jeramdas, a fellow prisoner in Yerwada Central Jail with him. He mulls over the question a friend asked him about writing an autobiography, deeming it a Western practice, something "nobody does in the east". Gandhi himself agrees that his thoughts might change later in life but the purpose of his story is just to narrate his experiments with truth in life. He also says that through this book he wishes to narrate his spiritual and moral experiments rather than political.

=== Part I ===
The first part narrates incidents of Gandhi's childhood, his experiments with eating meat, smoking, drinking, stealing and subsequent atonement. There are two texts that had a lasting influence on Gandhi, both of which he read in childhood. He records the profound impact of the play Harishchandra and says,"I read it with intense interest...It haunted me and I must have acted Harishchandra to myself times without number." Another text he mentions reading that deeply affected him was Shravana Pitrabhakti Nataka, a play about Shravan's devotion to his parents. Gandhi got married at the age of 13. In his words, "It is my painful duty to have to record here my marriage at the age of thirteen...I can see no moral argument in support of such a preposterously early marriage." Another important event documented in this part is the demise of Gandhi's father Karamchand Gandhi. Gandhi wrote the book to deal with his experiment for truth. His disdain for physical training at school, particularly gymnastics has also been written about in this part.

=== Part II ===
The second part of the book details Gandhi's experiences in the Cape Colony during a period of tension between the different ethnic groups in the region. The Cape Colony was dominated by British South Africans, while the neighboring Orange Free State and Transvaal Republic were established by Boers, white settlers of Dutch descent who had migrated away from the Cape Colony further north in the early 19th century and established the two independent republics. Gandhi detailed the antagonistic relationships between the two Afrikaner republics and the Cape Colony along with his experiences of being racially discriminated while in Africa. Indians had been migrating to South Africa for decades to work on coffee and sugar plantations, and while they did not experience as much discrimination as the Black population did, numerous discriminatory legislation had been put into place, effectively transforming Indian migrants into second-class citizens. Gandhi repeatedly experienced the sting of humiliation during his long African sojourn. The incident at Maritzburg, where Gandhi was thrown off the train has become famous. When Gandhi, as a matter of principle, refused to leave the first class compartment, he was thrown off the train. Later, Gandhi also had difficulty being admitted to hotels, and saw that his fellow-Indians, who were mostly manual laborers, experienced even more unjust treatment.

Very soon after his arrival, Gandhi's initial bafflement and indignation at discriminatory policies turned into a growing sense of outrage and propelled him into assuming a position as a public figure at the assembly of Transvaal Indians, where he delivered his first speech urging Indians not to accept inequality but instead to unite, work hard, learn English and observe clean living habits. Although Gandhi's legal work soon start to keep him busy, he found time to read some of Tolstoy's work, which greatly influenced his understanding of peace and justice and eventually inspired him to write to Tolstoy, setting the beginning of a correspondence. Both Tolstoy and Gandhi shared a philosophy of non-violence and Tolstoy's harsh critique of human society resonated with Gandhi's outrage at racism in South Africa.

Both Tolstoy and Gandhi considered themselves followers of the Sermon on the Mount from the New Testament, in which Jesus Christ expressed the idea of complete self-denial for the sake of his fellow men. Gandhi also continued to seek moral guidance in the Bhagavad Gita, which inspired him to view his work not as self-denial at all, but as a higher form of self-fulfillment. Adopting a philosophy of selflessness even as a public man, Gandhi refused to accept any payment for his work on behalf of the Indian population, preferring to support himself with his law practice alone.

But Gandhi's personal quest to define his own philosophy with respect to religion did not rely solely on sacred texts. At the time, he also engaged in active correspondence with a highly educated and spiritual Jain from Bombay, his friend Raychandra, who was deeply religious, yet well versed in a number of topics, from Hinduism to Christianity. The more Gandhi communicated with Raychandra, the more deeply he began to appreciate Hinduism as a non violent faith and its related scriptures. Yet, such deep appreciation also gave birth to a desire to seek inner purity and illumination, without solely relying on external sources, or on the dogma within every faith. Thus, although Gandhi sought God within his own tradition, he espoused the idea that other faiths remained worthy of study and contained their own truths.

Not surprisingly, even after his work assignment concluded, Gandhi soon found a reason to remain in South Africa. This pivotal reason involved the "Indian Franchise Bill", with which the Natal legislature intended to deprive Indians of the right to vote. No opposition existed against this bill, except among some of Gandhi's friends who asked him to stay in South Africa and work with them against this new injustice against Indians, who white South Africans disparagingly called "coolies." He found that racist attitudes had become deeply entrenched, especially in the two Boer republics, where they lived in the worst urban slums and could not own property or manage agricultural land. Even in Natal, where Indians had more influence, they were not allowed to go out after 9 p.m. without a pass, while in the Cape Colony they were not allowed to walk on the sidewalk. The new bill which prohibited Indians from voting in Natal only codified existing injustice in writing.

Although a last-minute petition drive failed to prevent the Indian Franchise Bill from being passed, Gandhi remained active and organized a much larger petition, which he sent to the Secretary of State for the Colonies in London, and distributed to the press in South Africa, Britain and India. The petition raised awareness of the plight of Indians and generated discussions in all three continents to the point where both the Times of London and the Times of India published editorials in support of the Indian right to the vote. Gandhi also formed a new political organization called the Natal Indian Congress (a clear reference to the Indian National Congress), which held regular meetings and soon, after some struggles with financing, started its own library and debating society. They also issued two major pamphlets, An Appeal to Every Briton in South Africa, and The Indian Franchise–An Appeal, which argued in favor of eliminating discriminatory legislation targeting Indians.

Though, at first, Gandhi intended to remain in South Africa for a month, or a year at most, he ended up working in South Africa for about twenty years. After his initial assignment was over, he succeeded in growing his own practice to about twenty Indian merchants who contracted him to manage their affairs. This work allowed him to both earn a living while also finding time to devote to his mission as a public figure.

=== Part III ===
In South Africa with the Family, the Boer War, Bombay and South Africa Again.

In 1896, Gandhi made a brief return to India and returned to his wife and children. In India, he published another pamphlet, known as the Green Pamphlet, on the plight of Indians in South Africa. For the first time, Gandhi realized that Indians had come to admire his work greatly and experienced a taste of his own popularity among the people, when he visited Madras, an Indian province, where most manual laborers had originated. Although his fellow-Indians greeted him in large crowds with applause and adulation, he sailed back to South Africa with his family in December 1896.

Gandhi had become very well known in South Africa as well, to the point where a crowd of rioters awaited him at Port Natal, determined that he should not be allowed to enter. Many of them also mistakenly believed that all the dark-skinned passenger on the ship that took Gandhi to Natal were poor Indian immigrants he had decided to bring along with him, when, in reality, these passengers were mostly returning Indian residents of Natal. Fortunately, Gandhi was able to establish a friendly relationship with numerous white South Africans so the Natal port's police superintendent and his wife escorted him to safety. After this incident, local white residents began to actually regard him with greater respect.

As Gandhi resumed his work at the Natal Indian Congress, his loyalty to the British Empire guided him to assist them in the Second Boer War, which started three years later. Because Gandhi remained a passionate pacifist, he wanted to participate in the Boer War without actually engaging in violence so he organized and led an Indian Medical Corps which served with the British Army in a number of battles, including the important Battle of Spion Kop in January 1900, in which the Boers were victorious against the British.

During this period, Gandhi would remain supportive of the British Empire, and believed the British Constitution deserved the loyalty of all of Britain's subjects, including Indians. Gandhi saw discriminatory policies in the Cape Colony as a temporary aberration, and perceived British rule in India as being both beneficial and benevolent.

The armed conflict between the British and Boers raged on for over three years; despite the fact that Britain had occupied both the Orange Free State and the Transvaal Republic, thousands of Boers took to the hills to begin a guerilla campaign against the British in the countryside. Gandhi expected that the British victory would overturn discriminatory legislation in South Africa and present him with an opportunity to return to India. He wanted to attend the 1901 meeting of the Indian National Congress, whose mission was to provide a social and political forum for the Indian upper class. Founded in 1885 with the help of Briton Allan Octavian Hume, the Congress had no real political power and expressed pro-British positions. Gandhi wanted to attend its meeting nevertheless, as he was hoping to pass a resolution in support of the Indian population in South Africa. Before he left for Bombay, Gandhi promised the Natal Indian Congress that he would return to support their efforts, should they need his help.

As Gandhi attended the 1901 Indian National Congress, his hopes came true. Gopal Krishna Gokhale, one of the most prominent Indian politicians of the time, supported the resolution for the rights of Indians in South Africa and the resolution was passed. Through Gokhale, in whose house Gandhi stayed for a month, Gandhi met many political connections that would serve him later in life.

However, his promise to always aid his friends in Natal soon prompted him to return to South Africa, when he received an urgent telegram informing him that the Boers had formed a peaceful relationship with British South Africans and now held political sway in the Cape Colony as well; the telegram also informed him that this would be a severe setback in his attempt to overturn discriminatory legislation targeting Indian South Africans.

Gandhi travelled back to South Africa immediately and met with Joseph Chamberlain, Secretary of State for the Colonies, and presented him with a paper on the discriminatory policies instituted against the Indian population but Chamberlain instead rebuffed Gandhi and informed him that Indians living in South Africa would have to accede to the will of the Afrikaners, who now were granted increased political power as a result of the formation of the Union of South Africa as a dominion.

Gandhi began to organize a fast response to this new South African political configuration. Instead of working in Natal, he now established a camp in the newly conquered Transvaal region and began helping Indians who had escaped from the war in that region, and now had to purchase overly expensive re-entry passes. He also represented poor Indians who were dispossessed of dwellings in a shantytown by the authorities. Gandhi also started a new magazine, Indian Opinion, that advocated for political liberty and equal rights in South Africa. The magazine, which initially included several young women from Europe, expanded its staff around the country, increasing both Gandhi's popularity and the public support for his ideas.

At around the same time, Gandhi read John Ruskin's book Unto This Last, which maintained that the life of manual labor was superior to all other ways of living. As he adopted this belief, Gandhi chose to abandon the Western dress and habits, and he moved his family and staff to a Transvaal farm called the Phoenix, where he even renounced the use of an oil-powered engine and printed Indian Opinion by hand-wheel, and performed agriculture labor using old, manual farming equipment. He began to conceive of his public work as a mission to restore old Indian virtue and civilization, rather than fall prey to modern Western influence, which included electricity and technology.

Between 1901 and 1906, he also changed another aspect of his personal life by achieving Brahmacharya, or the voluntary abstention from sexual relations. He made this choice as part of his philosophy of selflessness and self-restraint. Finally, he also formulated his own philosophy of political protest, called Satyagraha, which literally meant "truth-force" in Sanskrit. In practice, this practice meant protesting injustice steadfastly, but in a non-violent manner.

He put this theory into practice on 8 September 1906, when, at a large gathering of the Indian community in Transvaal, he asked the whole community to take a vow of disobedience to the law, as the Transvaal government had started an effort to register every Indian child over the age of eight, which would make them an official part of the South African population.

Setting a personal example, Gandhi became the first Indian to appear before a magistrate for his refusal to register, and he was sentenced to two months in prison. He actually asked for a heavier sentence, a request, consistent with his philosophy of self-denial. After his release, Gandhi continued his campaign and thousands of Indians burned their registration cards, crossing the Transvaal-Natal border without passes. Many went to jail, including Gandhi, who went to jail again in 1908.

Gandhi did not waver when a South African General by the name of Jan Christian Smuts promised to eliminate the registration law, but broke his word. Gandhi went all the way to London in 1909 and gathered enough support among the members of the British government to convince Smuts to eliminate the law in 1913. Yet the Transvaal Prime Minister continued to regard Indians as second-class citizens while the Cape Colony government passed another discriminatory law making all non-Christian marriages illegal, which meant that all Indian children would be considered born out of wedlock. In addition, the government in Natal continued to impose a crippling poll tax upon Indians entering Natal.

In response to these strikingly unjust rules, Gandhi organized a large-scale satyagraha, which involved women crossing the Natal-Transvaal border illegally. When they were arrested, five thousand Indian coal miners also went on strike; Gandhi himself led them across the Natalese border, where they expected arrest.

Although Smuts and Gandhi did not agree on many points, they had respect for each other. In 1913, Smuts relented due to the sheer number of Indians involved in protest and negotiated a settlement which provided for the legality of Indian marriages and abolished the poll tax. Further, the import of indentured laborers from India was to be phased out by 1920. In July 1914, Gandhi sailed for Britain, known throughout the world for the success of his satyagraha.

=== Part IV ===
Part IV. Mahatma in the Midst of World Turmoil

Gandhi was in England when World War I started and he immediately began organizing a medical corps similar to the force he had led in the Boer War, but he had also faced health problems that caused him to return to India, where he met the applauding crowds with enthusiasm once again. Indians started to refer to him as "Mahatma" ("Great Soul"), an appellation reserved only for the holiest men of Hinduism. While Gandhi accepted the love and admiration of the crowds, he also insisted that all souls were equal and did not accept the implication of religious sacredness that his new name carried.

In order to retreat into a life of humility and restraint, as his personal principles mandated, he decided to withdraw from public life for a while spending his first year in India focusing on his personal quest for purity and healing. He also lived in a communal space with untouchables, a choice which many of his financial supporters resented, because they believed that the very presence of untouchables defiled higher-caste Indians. Gandhi even considered moving to a district in Ahmedabad inhabited entirely by the untouchables when a generous Muslim merchant donated enough money to keep up his current living space for another year. By that time, Gandhi's communal life with the untouchables had become more acceptable.

Although Gandhi had withdrawn from public life, he briefly met with the British Governor of Bombay (and future Viceroy of India), Lord Willington, whom Gandhi promised to consult before he launched any political campaigns. Gandhi also felt the impact of another event, the passing of Gopal Krishna Gokhale, who had become his supporter and political mentor. He stayed away from the political trend of Indian nationalism, which many of the members of the Indian National Congress embraced. Instead, he stayed busy resettling his family and the inhabitants of the Phoenix Settlement in South Africa, as well as the Tolstoy Settlement he had founded near Johannesburg. For this purpose, on 25 May 1915, he created a new settlement, which came to be known as the Satyagraha ashram (derived from the Sanskrit word "Satya" meaning "truth") near the town of Ahmedabad and close to his place of birth in the western Indian province of Gujarat. All the inhabitants of the ashram, which included one family of untouchables, swore to poverty and chastity.

After a while, Gandhi became influenced by the idea of Indian independence from the British, but he dreaded the possibility that a westernized Indian elite would replace the British colonial government. He developed a strong conviction that Indian independence should take place as a large-scale sociopolitical reform, which would remove the old plagues of extreme poverty and caste restrictions. In fact, he believed that Indians could not become worthy of self-government unless they all shared a concern for the poor.

As Gandhi resumed his public life in India in 1916, he delivered a speech at the opening of the new Hindu University in the city of Benares, where he discussed his understanding of independence and reform. He also provided specific examples of the abhorrent living conditions of the lower classes that he had observed during his travels around India and focused specifically on sanitation.

Although the Indians of the higher-castes did not readily embrace the ideas in the speech, Gandhi had now returned to public life and he felt ready to convert these ideas to actions. Facing the possibility of arrest, just like he always did in South Africa, Gandhi first spoke for the rights of impoverished indigo-cultivators in the Champaran district. His efforts eventually led to the appointment of a government commission to investigate abuses perpetrated on the indigo planters.

He also interfered whenever he saw violence. When a group of Ahmedabad mill workers went on strike and became violent, he resolved to fast until they returned to peace. Though some political commentators condemned Gandhi's behavior as a form of blackmail, the fast only lasted three days before the workers and their employers negotiated an agreement. Through this situation, Gandhi discovered the fast as one of his most effective weapons in later years and set a precedent for later action as part of satyagraha.

As the First World War continued, Gandhi also became involved in recruiting men for the British Indian Army, an involvement which his followers had a difficult time accepting, after listening to his passionate speeches about resisting injustice in a non-violent manner. At this point, although Gandhi still remained loyal to Britain and enamored with the ideals of the British constitution, his desire to support an independent home rule became stronger. As time passed, Gandhi became exhausted from his long journey around the country and fell ill with dysentery. He refused conventional treatment and chose to practice his own healing methods, relying on diet and spending a long time bedridden, while in recovery in his ashram.

In the meantime, the unrest in India increased exponentially with news of the British victories over the Ottoman Empire during the Middle Eastern theatre of the First World War. The prospect of the only major Muslim power in the world ceasing to exist was an unacceptable proposition to many Indian Muslims.

After the end of the war, the British colonial government decided to follow the recommendations of the Rowlatt Committee, which advocated the retention of various wartime restrictions in India, including curfews and measures to suppress free speech. Gandhi was still sick when these events took place and, although he could not protest actively, he felt his loyalty to the British Empire weaken significantly.

Later, when the Rowlatt Act actually became law, Gandhi proposed that the entire country observe a day of prayer, fasting, and abstention from physical labor as a peaceful protest against the injustice of the oppressive law. Gandhi's plea generated an overwhelming response as millions of Indians did not go to work on 6 April 1919.

As the entire country stood still, the British colonial government arrested Gandhi, which provoked angry crowds to fill the streets of India's cities and, much to Gandhi's dislike, violence erupted everywhere. Gandhi could not tolerate violence so he called off his campaign and asked that everyone return to their homes. He acted in accordance with his firm belief that if satyagraha could not be carried out without violence, it should not take place at all.

Unfortunately, not all protesters shared Gandhi's conviction as ardently. In Amritsar, capital of the region known as the Punjab, where the alarmed colonial authorities had deported the local Hindu and Muslim members of the Congress, the street mobs became very violent and the colonial government summoned Brigadier-General Reginald Dyer to restore order. Dyer prohibited all public meetings and instituted public whippings for Indians who confronted the police. A crowd of over ten thousand people gathered for religious purposes, and Dyer responded with bringing his troops there and opening fire without warning. Tightly packed together, the protesters had nowhere to run from the fire, even when they threw themselves down on the ground the fire was then directed on the ground, ceasing only when Dyer's troops ran out of ammunition. Hundreds died and many more were wounded.

This unfortunate occurrence became known as the Jallianwala Bagh massacre, it outraged the British public almost as much as Indian society. The authorities in London eventually condemned Dyer's conduct, forcing him to resign in disgrace. The effect the massacre had on Indian society became even more profound as more moderate politicians, like Gandhi, now began to wholeheartedly support the idea of Indian independence, creating an intense climate of mutual hostility. After the massacre, Gandhi eventually obtained permission to travel to Amritsar and conduct his own investigation. He produced a report months later and his work on the report motivated him to contact a number of Indian politicians, who advocated for the idea of independence from British colonial rule.

After the massacre, Gandhi attended the Muslim Conference being held in Delhi, where Indian Muslims discussed their fears that the British government would abolish the Ottoman Caliphate. Indian Muslims considered the Caliphs as heirs of Mohammed and spiritual heads of Islam. While the British government considered abolition a necessary effort to restore order after the First World War, the Muslim population of the British Empire viewed it as an unnecessary provocation. Gandhi urged them not to accept the actions of the British government. He proposed a boycott of British goods, and stated that if the British government continued to insist on the abolition of the Caliphate, Indian Muslims should take even more drastic measures of non-cooperation, involving areas such as government employment and taxes.

During the months that followed, Gandhi continued to advocate for peace and caution, however, since Britain and the Ottomans were still negotiating their peace terms. Unlike more nationalistic politicians, he also supported the Montagu-Chelmsford Reforms for India, as they laid the foundation for constitutional self-government. Eventually, other politicians who thought the reforms did not go far enough had to agree with Gandhi simply because his popularity and influence had become so great that the Congress could accomplish little without him.

While the British government remained determined to abolish the Ottoman Caliphate, they also continued to enforce the Rowlatt Act resolutely. Even Gandhi became less tolerant towards British colonial policies and in April 1920, he urged all Indians, Muslim and Hindu, to begin a "non-cooperation" protest against British policies by giving up their Western clothing and jobs in the colonial government. As a personal example, on 1 August, he returned the kasar-i-hind medal that he had received for providing medical service to wounded British soldiers during the Second Boer War. He also became the first president of the Home Rule League, a largely symbolic position which confirmed his position as an advocate for Indian Independence.

In September 1920, Gandhi also passed an official constitution for the Congress, which created a system of two national committees and numerous local units, all working to mobilize a spirit of non-cooperation across India. Gandhi and other volunteers traveled around India further establishing this new grass roots organization, which achieved great success. The new Governor-General of India Lord Reading, did not dare to interfere because of Gandhi's immense popularity.

By 1922, Gandhi decided that the initiative of non-cooperation had to transform into open civil disobedience, but in March 1922, Lord Reading finally ordered Gandhi's arrest after a crowd in the city of Chauri Chaura attacked and assassinated the local representatives of British colonial government. Gandhi, who had never encouraged or sanctioned this type of conduct, condemned the actions of the violent crowds and retreated into a period of fasting and prayer as a response to this violent outburst. However, the colonial government saw the event as a trigger point and a reason for his arrest.

=== Part V ===
The British colonial authorities placed Gandhi on trial for sedition and sentenced him to six years in prison, marking the first time that he faced prosecution in India. Because of Gandhi's fame, the judge, C.N. Broomfield, hesitated to impose a harsher punishment. He considered Gandhi clearly guilty as charged, given the fact that Gandhi admitted his guilt of supporting non-violent, open civil disobedience and even went as far as requesting the heaviest possible sentence. Such willingness to accept imprisonment conformed to his philosophy of satyagraha, so Gandhi felt that his time in prison only furthered his commitment and goals. The authorities allowed him to use a spinning wheel and receive reading materials while in prison, so he felt content. He also wrote most of his autobiography while serving his sentence.

However, in Gandhi's absence, Indians returned to the jobs they had previously spurned and their every day routines. Even worse, the unity between Muslims and Hindus, which Gandhi advocated so passionately, had already begun to fall apart to the point where the threat of violence loomed large over many communities with mixed population. The campaign for Indian independence could not continue while Indians themselves suffered disunity and conflict, all the more difficult to overcome in a huge country like India, which had always suffered religious divisions, as well as divisions by language, and even caste.

Gandhi realized that the British government of the time, had lost the will and power to maintain their empire, but he always acknowledged that Indians could not rely simply on the weakening of Britain in order to achieve independence. He believed that Indians had to become morally ready for independence. He planned to contribute to such readiness through his speeches and writing, advocating humility, restraint, good sanitation, as well as an end to child marriages.

After his imprisonment ended, he resumed his personal quest for purification and truth. He ends his autobiography by admitting that he continues to experience and fight with "the dormant passion" that lie within his own soul. He felt ready to continue the long and difficult path of taming those passions and putting himself last among his fellow human beings, the only way to achieve salvation, according to him.

"That is why the worlds' praise fails to move me; indeed it very often stings me. To conquer the subtle passions is far harder than the physical conquest of the world by the force of arms,"

Gandhi writes in his "Farewell" to the readers, a suitable conclusion for an autobiography that he never intended to be an autobiography, but a tale of experiments with life, and with truth.

== Reception ==
The autobiography is noted for its lucid, simple and idiomatic language and its transparently honest narration. The autobiography itself has become a key document for interpreting Gandhi's life and ideas.

In his essay "Reflections on Gandhi" (1949), George Orwell argued that the autobiography made clear Gandhi's "natural physical courage", which he saw as later confirmed by the circumstances of his assassination; his lack of feelings of envy, inferiority, or suspiciousness, the last of which Orwell thought was common to Indian people; and his lack of racial prejudice. Noting the circumstances of the book's serialisation, Orwell argues it "is not a literary masterpiece, but it is the more impressive because of the commonplaceness of much of its material." Orwell found the book to indicate that Gandhi "was a very shrewd, able person who could, if he had chosen, have been a brilliant success as a lawyer, an administrator or perhaps even a businessman."

In a 1998 interview, Gujarati writer Harivallabh Bhayani mentioned this work as the most important work, together with Govardhanram Tripathi's Saraswatichandra, to have emerged in Gujarat in the last 50 years.

== Influences ==
Gandhi wrote in his autobiography that the three most important modern influences in his life were Leo Tolstoy's The Kingdom of God Is Within You (1894), John Ruskin's Unto This Last (essays 1860, book 1862), and the poet Shrimad Rajchandra (Raychandbhai).

=== Editions in print ===
- India – ISBN 81-7229-008-X
- United States – authorized edition with foreword by Sissela Bok, Beacon Press 1993 reprint: ISBN 0-8070-5909-9
- Dover Publications 1983 reprint of 1948 Public Affairs Press edition: ISBN 0-486-24593-4

== Sources ==
- Malinar, Angelika (2019). "Chapter 30. Mohandas Karamchand Gandhi: [An Autobiography or The Story of My Experiments with Truth]". In Wagner-Egelhaaf, Martina (ed.). Handbook of Autobiography / Autofiction. De Gruyter Handbook. Berlin, Boston: De Gruyter. pp. 1703–1718. doi:10.1515/9783110279818-141. ISBN 978-3-11-038148-1. S2CID 192020680.
- Orwell, George (1968) [1949]. "Reflections on Gandhi". In Orwell, Sonia; Angus, Ian (eds.). The Collected Essays, Journalism and Letters of George Orwell, Volume 4: In Front of Your Nose 1945–1950. Penguin.
- Suhrud, Tridip (2011). "Gandhi's key writings: In Search of Unity". In Brown, Judith; Parel, Anthony (eds.). The Cambridge Companion to Gandhi. Cambridge University Press. pp. 71–92. ISBN 978-1-139-82484-2.
- Suhrud, Tridip (November–December 2018). "The Story of Antaryami". Social Scientist. 46 (11–12): 37–60. JSTOR 26599997.

=== External links ===
- Gujarati Wikisource has original text related to this article: સત્યના પ્રયોગો અથવા આત્મકથા
- English Wikisource has original text related to this article: The Story of My Experiments with Truth
- The Story of My Experiments with Truth at Google Books
- The Story of My Experiments with Truth at Google Books (critical edition)
- The Story of My Experiments with Truth, translated by Mahadev Desai at Standard Ebooks
- National Institute of Technology Calicut, Kozhikode: Nalanda Digital Lib.
- An Autobiography or The Story of my Experiments with Truth, full text
- Read online The Story of My Experiments with Truth – Gandhi Heritage Portal
- The Story of My Experiments with Truth in Gujarati Vishwakosh.
