= Gandhi Heritage Portal =

Archive of the writings of Gandhi

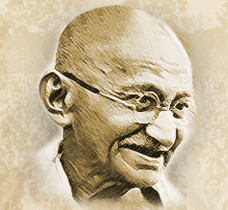
- Mahatma Gandhi
- Founded: 2 September 2013
- Founder: Sabarmati Ashram Preservation and Memorial Trust
- Headquarters: Ahmedabad, India
- Website: gandhiheritageportal.org

The online Gandhi Heritage Portal preserves, protects, and disseminates the original writings of Mohandas K. Gandhi and makes available to the world the large corpus of "Fundamental Works" useful for any comprehensive study of the life and thought of Gandhiji.

The Government of India and its Ministry of Culture, acting on the recommendation of the Gandhi Heritage Sites Committee headed by Shri Gopal Krishna Gandhi, gave the responsibility of conceptualising, designing, developing and maintaining the Gandhi Heritage Portal to the Sabarmati Ashram Preservation and Memorial Trust.

The Collected Works of Mahatma Gandhi (100 volumes), Gandhiji No Akshar Deha (82 volumes) and Sampoorna Gandhi Vangmaya (97 volumes) form the basic structure around which the Portal has been developed. The key texts provide first editions of the Key Texts of Gandhi. These are: Hind Swaraj, Satyagraha in South Africa, An Autobiography or The Story of My Experiments with Truth, From Yervada Mandir, Ashram Observances in Action, Constructive Programmes: Their Meaning and Place, Key To Health, and Gandhi's translation of the Gita as Anasakti Yoga.

The Fundamental Works are those through which The Collected Works of Mahatma Gandhi (CWMG) was created, for instance, the Mahadevbhai Ni Diary. Over time, the portal plans to provide all the collected work.

The Journals provide electronic versions of Indian Opinion, Navajivan, Young India, Harijan, Harijan Bandhu, and Harijan Sevak. A subsection provides some journals which make up for a fuller archive of the Gandhian imagination and scholarship. At present, the Portal has been placed as a representation of Gandhi Marg (Hindi & English), Bhoomi Putra, Pyara Bapu and the unique handwritten journal of the Satyagraha Ashram Madhpudo, which among other things carries Prabhudas Gandhi's Jivan Nu Parodh and Kakasaheb Kalelkar's Smaran Yatra. The Portal hopes to include many more journals as it acquires them over time.

Other Works is a section that considers the commentarial and memoire literature.

The Life and Times section is under development and will provide information that could lead the reader to explore the data. The Gallery will provide audio, visual, and film material and images of caricatures, paintings and postage stamps. The Portal offers a sample of each.

The Gandhi Heritage Sites, under development and verification, will provide multiple layers of information regarding places that Gandhiji visited. The information will also contain references to primary sources about these visits.

== The Collected Works of Mahatma Gandhi ==
The project was initiated by the government of India in 1956. They aimed to provide authentic documentation of all Gandhiji's available writings. The Collected Works of Mahatma Gandhi resulted from this effort, which concluded in 1994. It was decided that Gandhiji's writings should be available in Gujarati, English and Hindi. Consequently, Gandhiji No Akshardeha (Gujarati) and Sampoorna Gandhi Vangmaya (Hindi) were created based upon the editorial architecture determined for the CWMG. There are 100 volumes of the CWMG, 82 volumes of Gandhiji No Akshardeha and 97 volumes of Sampoorna Gandhi Vangmaya.

These volumes provide information about the source of these writings and the language in which they were initially written. Volumes 1 to 90 of the CWMG follow chronological order, while volumes 91-97 are supplementary volumes created to accommodate new material acquired after the series' publication. Volumes 98 and 99 are the Index of Subjects and Index of Persons, respectively. Volume 100 is the compilation of prefaces of the preceding volumes.

The Gandhi Heritage Portal provides unabridged, complete sets of these. These are available in two options: archival version and enhanced version, which is a black and white version. These volumes are interlinked through a database that the Portal team has developed. It allows one to move between the three languages and search for the same item. This would enable users to compare and study their texts and explore translation questions. The search criteria are defined in volumes 98 and 99 of CWMG. The Portal is committed to providing a searchable CWMG ebook, based on the first edition.

== The Key Texts ==
Gandhiji wrote seven books and did a Gujarati translation of the Bhagvad Gita. These eight texts form the section Key Texts. These are Hind Swaraj, Satyagraha in South Africa, An Autobiography or The Story of My Experiments with Truth, From Yervada Mandir, Ashram Observances in Action, Constructive Programmes: Their Meaning and Place, Key To Health, and Gandhi's translation of the Gita as Anasakti Yoga.

These are arranged in chronological order. The section also provides a history of their printing and translations. Hind Swaraj, which Gandhiji considered a "seed text," illustrates this. The Portal provides a facsimile edition of his manuscript, written on board by SS Kildonan Castle between 13 and 22 November 1909. This is followed by the first Gujarati edition printed in the two issues of Indian Opinion (11 December 1909 and 18 December 1909). Gandhiji translated this into English as Indian Home Rule in 1910, after the proscription imposed upon the Gujarati edition by the Government of Bombay in March 1910. A Hindi translation follows the English translation. A similar order is followed in the case of all other texts, albeit facsimile editions of other key texts are unavailable.

An attempt has been made to provide first editions of all the works, including translations. Gandhi was acutely sensitive to the question of translation. His closest associates, including Mahadev Desai and Valji Govindji Desai, translated his key texts. Gandhi read, revised, and authenticated these translations.

The Portal also provides rare copies of some of these key texts. The Navajivan of 29 November 1925 carried the first instalment of Gandhiji's autobiography, Satya Na Prayogo, and the last chapter, "Farewell," was published in the issue of 3 February 1929 of the same magazine. Mahadev Desai's English translation commenced with the 3 December 1925 issue of Young India and continued till 3 February 1929. The first edition of the English translation, The Story of My Experiments with Truth, was published in two volumes: the first, containing three parts, was issued in 1927, and the second, containing parts IV and V, in 1929. The second revised edition of the autobiography was issued in 1940 with a new title: An Autobiography or The Story of My Experiments with Truth. The edition of the autobiography placed on the Portal is not only the first English edition, but also the copy on which Rt. Hon. Sir V. S. Srinivasa Sastri suggested careful revisions from the point of view of language.

The Portal also provides translations of these texts in other languages. At present, An Autobiography or The Story of My Experiments with Truth is available in thirteen languages. The aspiration is to make available as many translations of the key texts as possible, either in full or with complete bibliographic information.

== Fundamental works ==
The Fundamental Works are the source of the CWMG. These include diaries, memoirs, selections from compilations of letters, and biographies. The CWMG could not exist without the diaries of Mahadev Desai, Gandhiji's closest companion from 1917 to 1942. The Fundamental Works provide three language editions of Mahadev Bhai Ni Diary. Similarly, the published works of Manubehn Gandhi also form part of the Fundamental Works.

There is a rich and long biographical tradition of recounting Gandhiji's life, which commenced with Rev. Joseph Doke's M K Gandhi: An Indian Patriot in South Africa and includes such magnificent works as Pyarelal's The Early Phase and The Last Phase, D G Tendulkar's eight-volume biography Mahatma and Narayan Desai's Maru Jivan Ej Mari Vani. These form part of the Fundamental Works. Also included are works of Gandhi's associates like C.F. Andrews and Mirabehn.

This section also includes various translations of the Key Texts. It aims to provide authoritative selections of Gandhiji's writings in various languages. The Fundamental Works would also include all available volumes of translations of the CWMG in other Indian languages, for example, Marathi.

== Journals ==
Gandhi endeavoured to reach out and communicate with as many people and opinions as possible. One such mode of communication was the publication of periodic journals in multiple languages. The Portal provides complete sets of journals he owned, edited, or published. These include Indian Opinion, Navajivan, Young India, Harijan, Harijan Bandhu, and Harijan Sevak.

Gandhi's ideas and practices have inspired many movements and academic inquiries. "Journals by Others" presents a selection of journals published by institutions and movements which seek to interrogate Gandhi's ideas and practices or record, document, and chronicle movements. These include Gandhi Marg (Hindi & English), Bhoomi Putra, Pyara Bapu, Kasturba Darshan and that unique handwritten journal of the Sataygraha Ashram Madhpudo. Complete, unabridged texts of these journals are made available. This section would become an archive of the Gandhian imagination and scholarship. The Portal plans to provide an ever-expanding list of such journals.

== Other works ==
Other works are a broad category, which seeks to provide either full, unabridged texts or complete bibliographic information on the vast and ever-expanding scholarship on Gandhiji and allied movements and institutions. This section also includes works of those who are crucial interlocutors of Gandhiji; C.F. Andrews is one example. It is difficult to understand and fully appreciate Gandhiji's striving in the absence of the works of his interlocutors.

This section would eventually include either full texts or bibliographic information on Gandhi's writings and his endeavours in academic journals. This will facilitate more comprehensive access to contemporary scholarship on these issues.

== Life And Times ==
This section provides selections and slivers of information arranged for easy reference. All the selections are made from the "Chronologies" given as a separate section and other Fundamental Works. Information about tours, marches, Satyagrahas, imprisonments, fasts and assaults is arranged in tabular form. For instance, the Dandi March is presented through four subsections: "Background to the Salt Satyagraha," "The Marchers," "The March," and "Events post March." A virtual tour mapping the walk to Dandi is also provided. The information is also linked to the sources in the CWMG to enable further study.

== Gandhi Heritage Sites ==
Gandhi moved across the Indian subcontinent and other parts of the world to carry his message of freedom, truth, nonviolence, Satyagraha, Swadeshi and equality for all. This was his way of inhabiting the land and being one with her people.

The Gandhi Heritage Sites Committee has designated thirty-nine locations as core sites. At present, a detailed site-specific chronology is being prepared at the Sabarmati Ashram Preservation and Memorial Trust. The classification framework includes place, persons, principles, and events, which will be linked to the source and presented on the Portal.

== The GHP at present ==
The portal currently provides approximately 500,000 pages of material in electronic format. For CWMG and the Key Texts, both archival and enhanced black-and-white images are provided. In addition to the textual material, it has over 1,000 photographs, 21 films, and 78 audio recordings. While most of the data is interlinked and searchable, at present, the search criteria are those determined by Volumes 98 and 99 of CWMG, that is, the Index of Subjects and Index of Persons.

== Goals ==
The Portal plans to make available a searchable electronic edition of The Collected Works of Mahatma Gandhi based on the first editions. The Trust is also working on a comprehensive compendium on the Gandhi Heritage Sites, which would be available on the Portal.

The Portal plans to host about a million pages of information in multiple languages, including Journals, Fundamental Works, and Other Works.

The Trust is also developing an online variorum of Gandhiji's manuscripts and will make available about 150,000 pages of original manuscripts. The variorum will be searchable through the catalogues of the Sabarmati Ashram archives. The Portal will collaborate with other national institutions, such as the National Archives of India and the Nehru Memorial Museum and Library, to make the variorum as comprehensive as possible.
