= Tallapragada Prakasarayudu =

Tallapragada Prakasarayadu
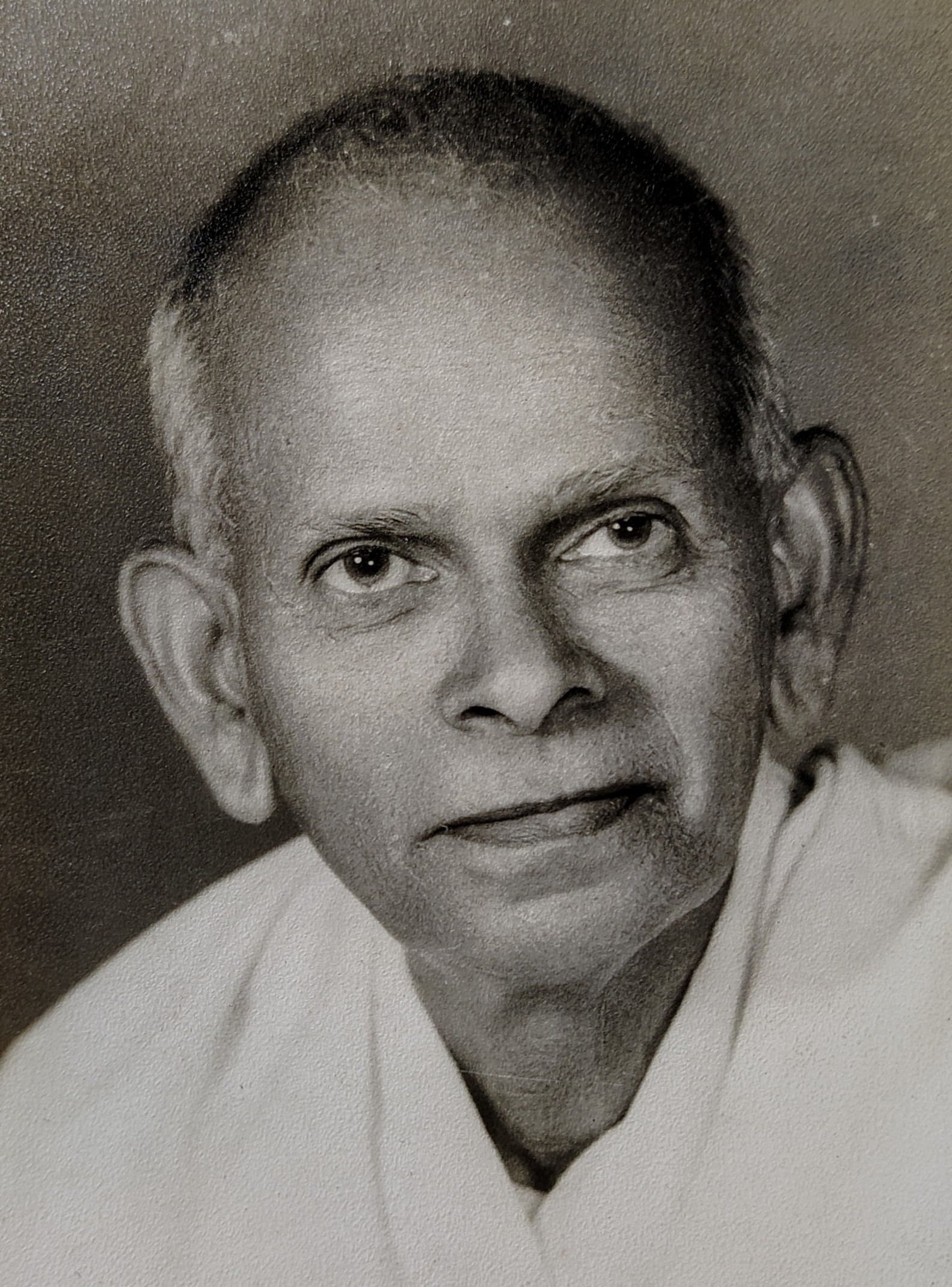
- Born: 15 April 1893; Unguturu, Andhra Pradesh
- Died: 28 February 1988 (aged 94); Hyderabad, Telangana
- Education: Calcutta University
- Occupations: Freedom fighter, social reformer, educationist, writer

Tallapragada Prakasarayudu (April 1893 – Feb 1988) was an Indian social reformer, freedom fighter, educationist, and writer. He was a prominent Gandhian and a distinguished exponent of Brahmoism. India has produced a few great men who led exemplary lives and silently influenced the lives of other men. Shri Prakasarayadu exemplifies the values of supreme self-sacrifice, personal rectitude, quiet efficiency and a desire to avoid lime light. His services in the cause of education are inestimable. Dedicated wholly to the Gandhian principles, Shri Prakasarayadu lived an unostentatious life. He grew cotton and spun on Charkha since 1921, devotedly performing the 'Sutra Yagna' of Gandhiji in spirit and action. After the independence of India, he continued his freedom struggle to leave no stone unturned to attain real freedom which consists in social justice and economic equality. He discharged his duties to all constructive programmes connected with national integration, social reform, religious harmony, propagation of Khadi, prohibition, basic education, anti-dowry movement, removal of untouchability and eradication of casteism.

== Gallery ==
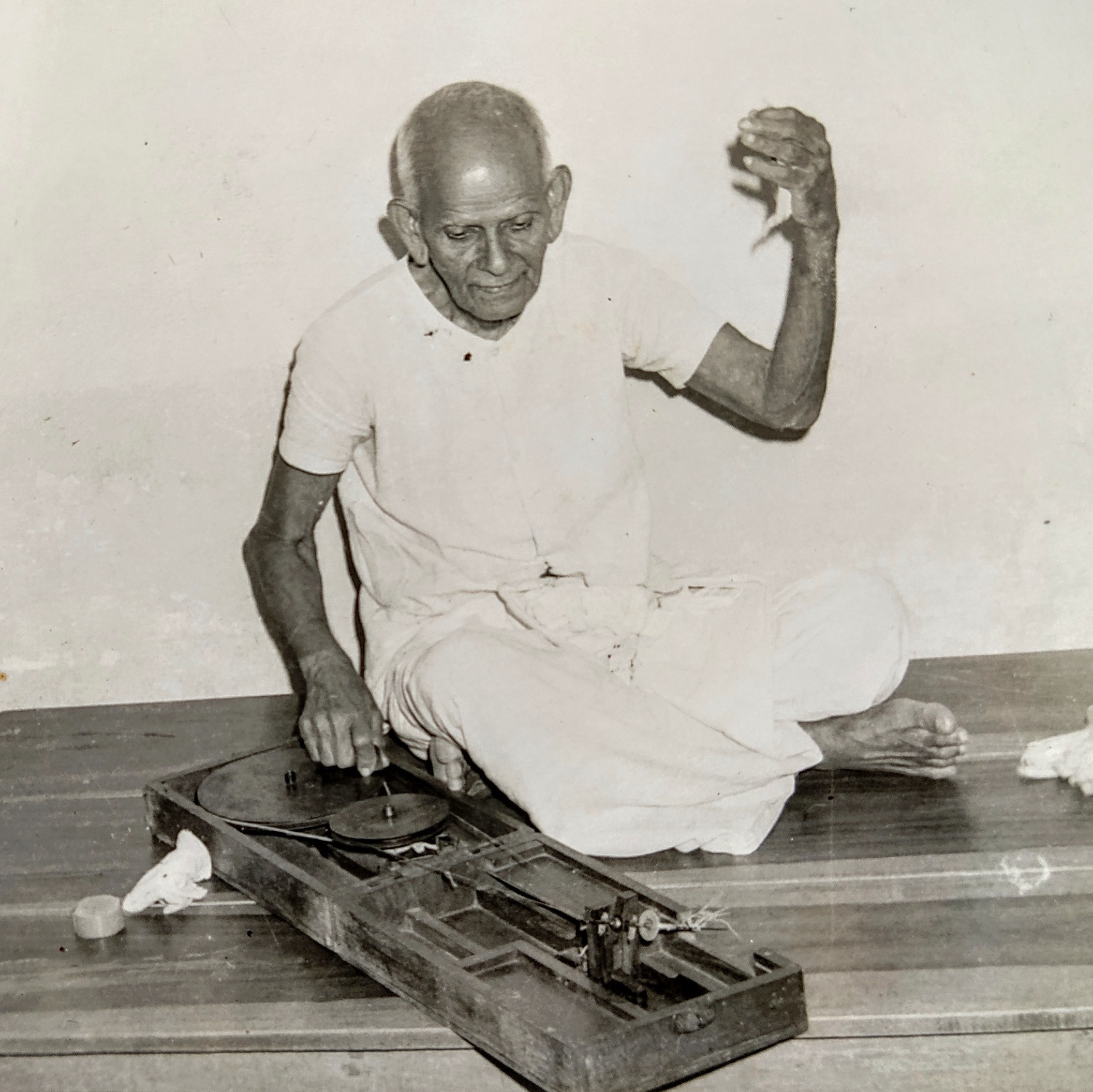
Prakasarayadu spinning cotton on his charkha

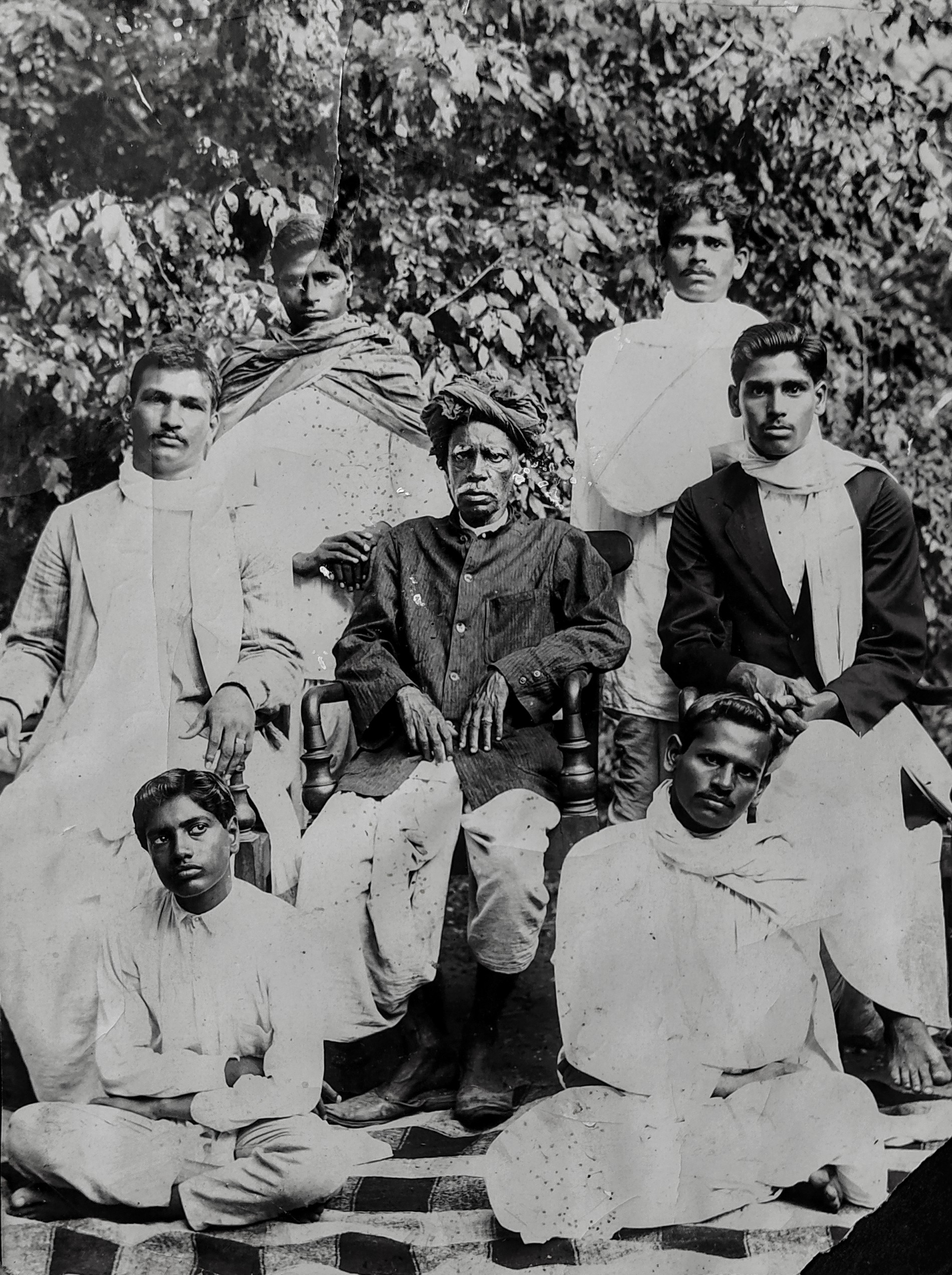
Tallapragada Prakasarayadu (top right) with his teacher and mentor, Sri Kandukuri Veeresalingam Pantulu (centre) (1911)

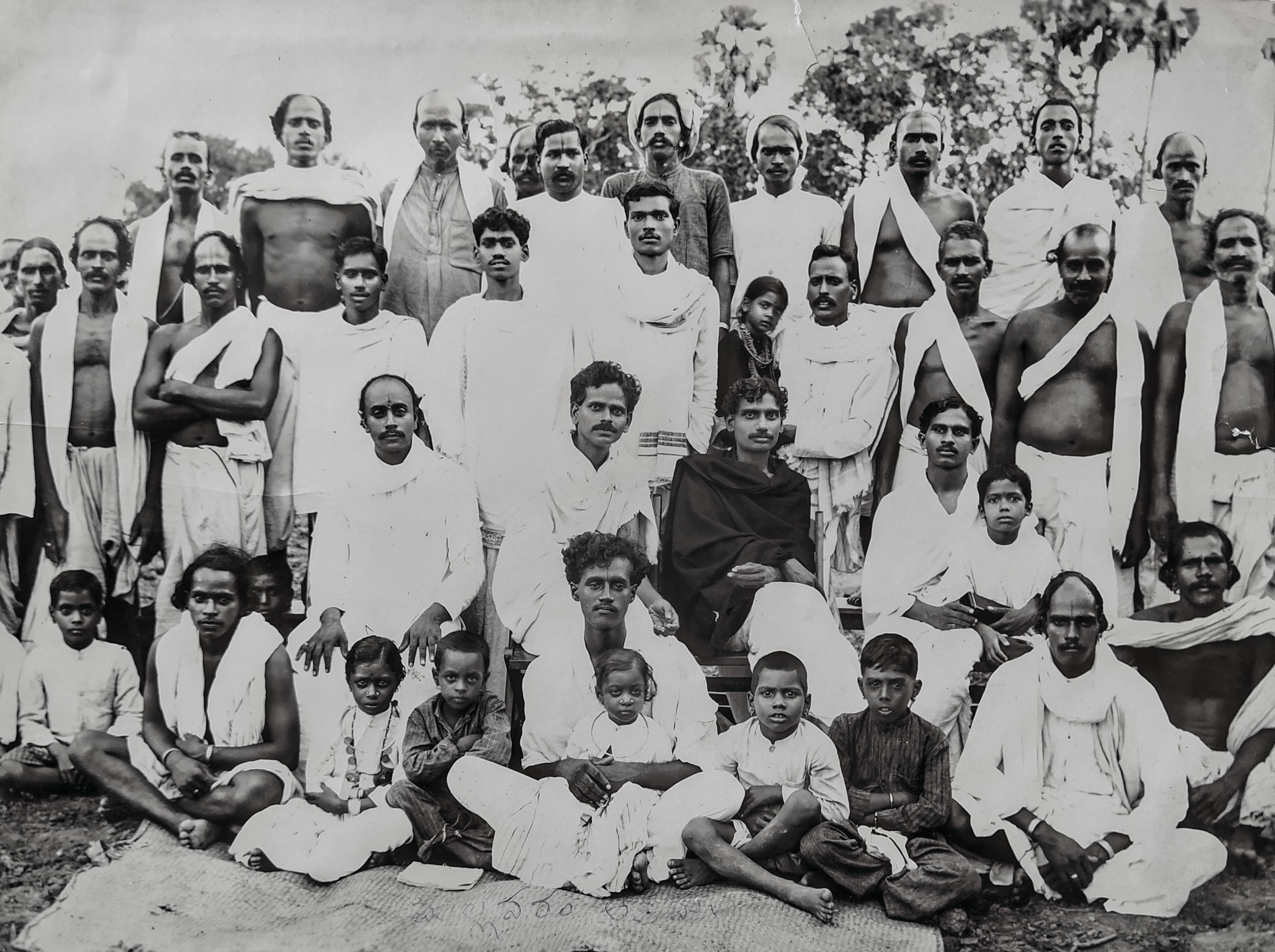
Tallapragada Prakasarayadu (seated on chair, second from left) at the Ananda Niketan Ashram he established in 1924 (picture from 1928)

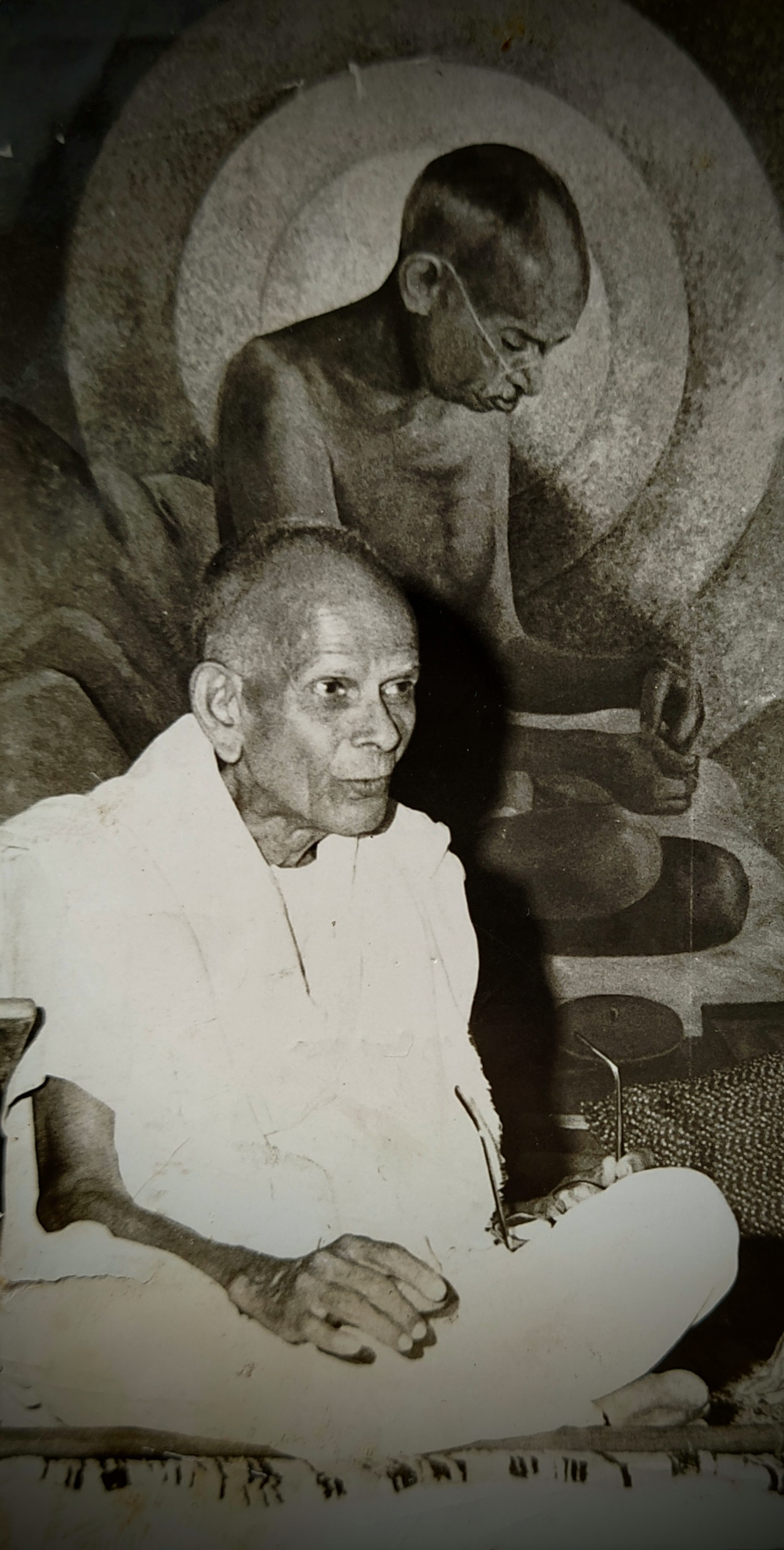
Tallapragada Prakasarayadu, aged 90, speaking to students about Gandhian thought at the Andhra Mahila Sabha (1983)
