= Trusteeship (Gandhism) =

Socio-economic philosophy propounded by Mohandas Karamchand Gandhi

Trusteeship is a socio-economic philosophy that was propounded by Mohandas Karamchand Gandhi. It provides a means by which the wealthy people would be the trustees of trusts that looked after the welfare of the people in general. This concept was condemned by socialists as being in favor of the landlords, feudal princes and the capitalists, opposed to socialist theories. Gandhi believed that the wealthy people could be persuaded to part with their wealth to help the poor. Putting it in Gandhiji's words "Supposing I have come by a fair amount of wealth – either by way of legacy, or by means of trade and industry – I must know that all that wealth does not belong to me; what belongs to me is the right to an honourable livelihood by millions of others. The rest of my wealth belongs to the community and must be used for the welfare of the community." Gandhi along with his followers, after their release from prison formulated a "simple" and a "practical" formula where Trusteeship was explained. A draft practical trusteeship formula was prepared by Gandhi’s co-workers, Narhari Parikh and Kishorelal Mashruwala and it was fine-tuned by M.L. Dantwala.

== Influences ==
The founder of the Tata Group, J.R.D. Tata was influenced by Gandhi's idea of trusteeship. He developed his personal and professional life based on this idea.

== See also ==
- Gandhism
- Gandhian economics
