= S. R. Mehrotra =

Indian historian (1931–2019)

Sri Ram Mehrotra
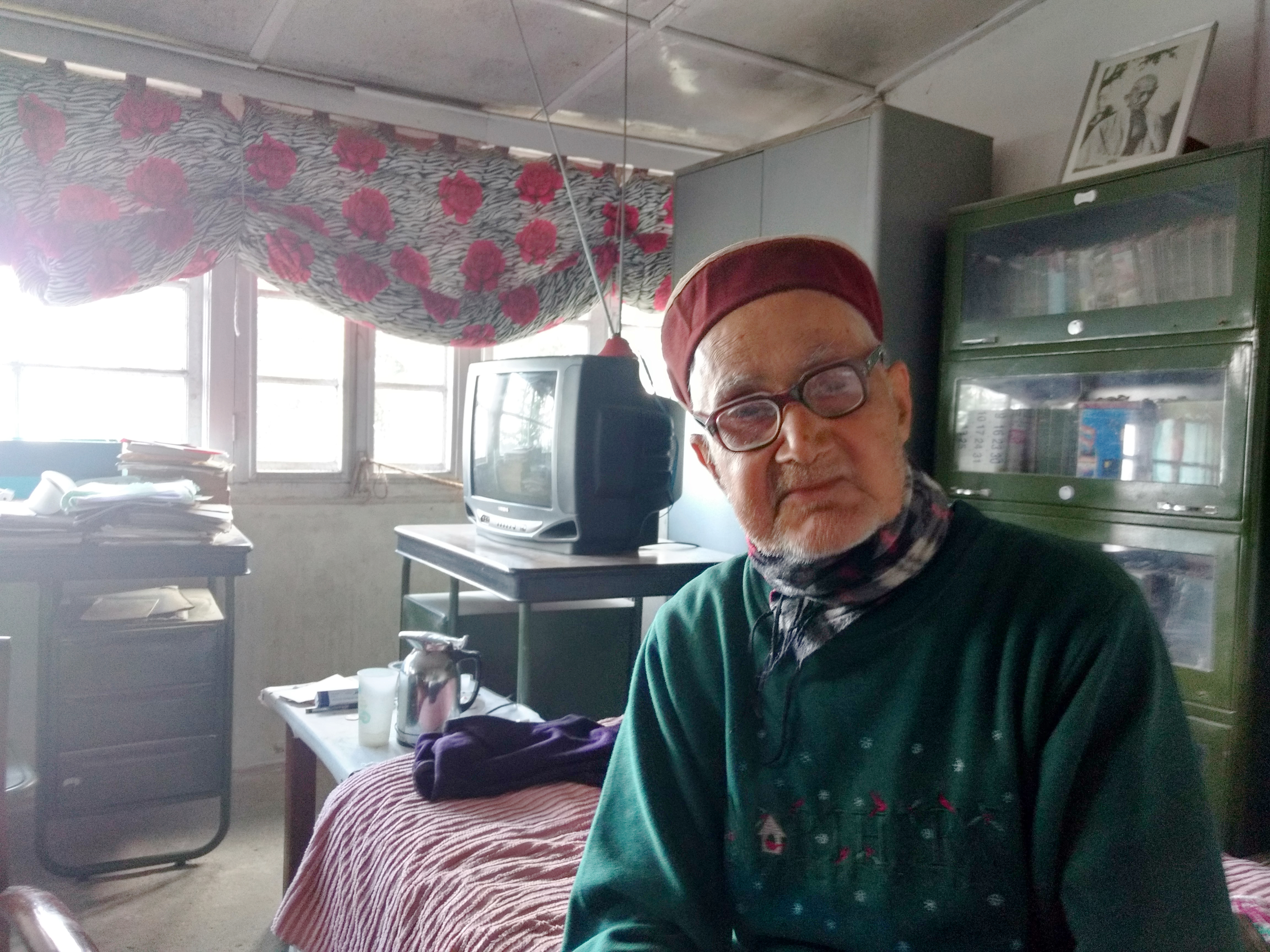
- S.R. Mehrotra at his home in Shimla in 2016
- Born: June 23, 1931; Anantram, Etawah
- Died: July 17, 2019 (aged 88)
- Occupation: professor of history

Sri Ram Mehrotra (23 June 1931 – 17 July 2019) was an Indian professor of history who published on the history of the Indian independence movement, the Indian National Congress, the life and work of its founder Allan Octavian Hume, and on the writings and philosophy of Gandhi. He also wrote a biography of Pranjivan Mehta, an important but little-known influence in the Indian independence movement who supported Gandhi. Mehrotra was known for his meticulous detail to sources and care in interpretations and published several annotated collections of sources and letters relating to Hume and towards the end of his life, Dadabhai Naoroji.

== Life and career ==
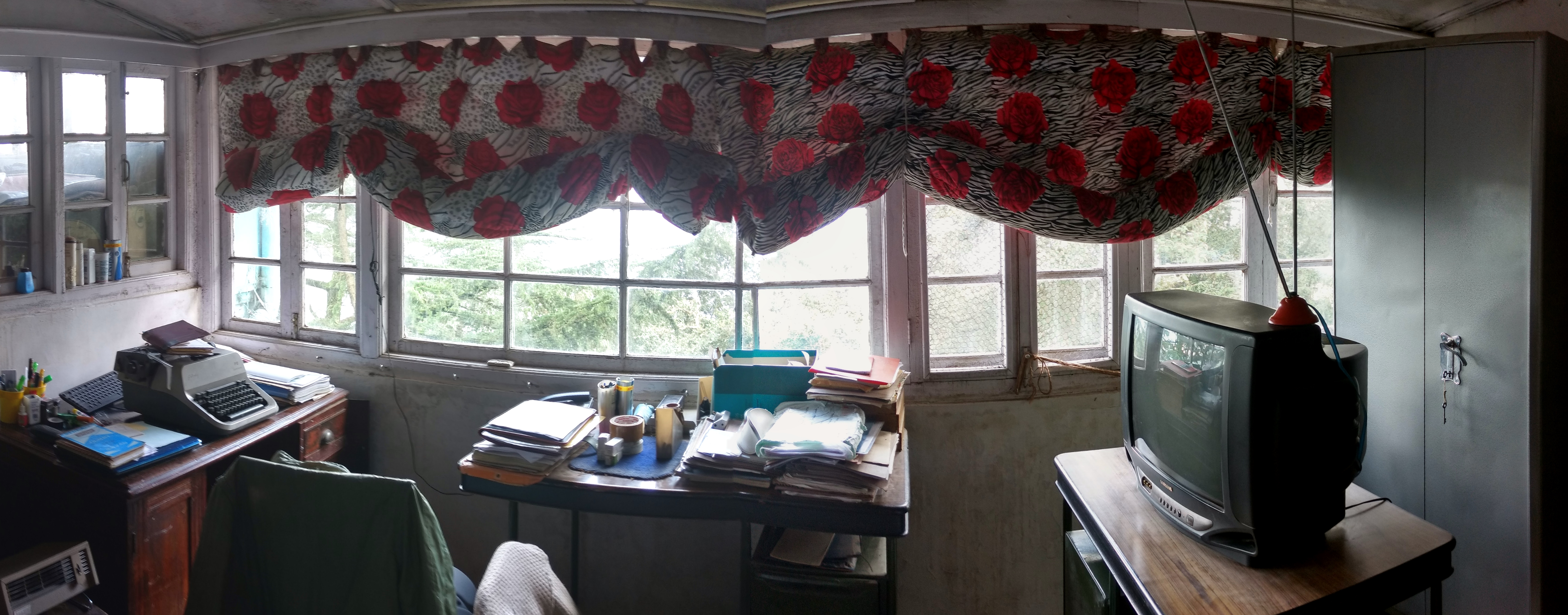
Living room in Shimla, 2016

Mehrotra was born in Anantram, Etawah. He went to a local government school (which had been founded by A. O. Hume, an abiding professional interest in later life) and later to the University of Allahabad, receiving an M.A. in history in 1950 after which he went to the University of London from where he received a Ph.D. in 1960. His Ph.D. dissertation was published as a book India and the Commonwealth (1965). He then worked as a lecturer at the University of London. He then moved to India and became a founding professor in the department of history at the Himachal Pradesh University in 1971. He was a visiting professor at the University of Wisconsin in 1974 and Visiting Fellow at St. John's College, Cambridge 1983-84. He was Jawaharlal Nehru Professor at Maharshi Dayanand University, Rohtak and a Fellow of the Indian Institute of Advanced Study, Shimla. Mehrotra received an honorary D.Litt. from Himachal Pradesh University in 2014, receiving the award from the Dalai Lama, honoured guest at the convocation ceremony.

== Personal life ==
Mehrotra was married to historian Dr Eva Mehrotra from 24 July 1957 until her death. The couple had no children. On retirement he moved to Shimla where he lived at Seva, Kenfield Estate. He died at his home in Shimla following a fall and hip injury.

== Writings ==
Mehrotra's published works include:

- Emergence of the Indian National Congress (1971, republished in 2004)
- The Commonwealth and the Nation (1978)
- Towards India’s Freedom and Partition (1979)
- A History of the Indian National Congress: Volume One, 1885-1918 (1995)
- M. K. Gandhi's Hind Swaraj: A Critical Edition (2010)
- The Mahatma and the Doctor (2014)
- (with Edward C. Moulton) Selected Writings of Allan Octavian Hume. Volume I (2004)

He also published numerous journal papers on the pre-Independence period that included such topics as the history of the British India Society, the Landholders' Society, the Poona Sarvajanik Sabha, as well as reviews of historical works. The proposed second volume of his history of the Indian National Congress, taking the story to independence in 1947, was never completed.
