= Harijan (magazine) =

Magazine by Mahatma Gandhi, 1933 to 1948

Harijan (lit. children of God, a term coined by Narsinh Mehta) was a weekly magazine founded by Mahatma Gandhi that was published from 1933 to 1955 except for a hiatus during the Quit India movement of the 1940s. The newspaper aimed to support the campaign by its publisher, Harijan Sevak Sangh ("The Servants of Untouchables Society"), for the abolition of untouchability in India. Issues of Harijan were usually released on Saturday, initially priced at one anna, and consisted of eight foolscap pages. Companion publications in Hindi (Harijan Sewak) and Gujarati (Harijanbandhu) were also established.

Harijan was founded to replace Young India, whose publication had ceased following Gandhi's arrest in January 1932. Ten thousand copies of the inaugural issue, edited by R. V. Shastri, were published from Poona on 11 February 1933 and contained several pieces by Gandhi on untouchability. The issue also contained a short message from B. R. Ambedkar calling for the purging of the caste system, as a whole, from Hinduism, which contrasted with Gandhi's desire to preserve a varna system after ridding it of hierarchy and untouchability. The debate on caste continued in later issues with contributions from Rabindranath Tagore among others, though Ambedkar refused to write any more to the newspaper that he believed favoured caste Hindu's and was condescending towards dalits.

Along with Gandhi's regular contributions that dealt with contemporary social, economic and political issues, Harijan published poetry and articles promoting social equality, and updates on religious and educational institutions that had begun to admit dalits. Another regular feature was the 'Question Box' in which Gandhi responded to questions and defended his position on various issues of the day.

== Collected issues ==
- Bodurant, Joan V., ed. (1973). Harijan: Collected Issues of Gandhi's Journal, 1933-1955 (19 vols.). New York: Garland Publishing.

== See also ==
- Indian Opinion
- Young India
