= Satyagraha =

Form of nonviolent or civil resistance

Mahatma Gandhi leading the famous 1930 Salt March, a notable example of satyagraha.

Satyāgraha, or "truth force", is a particular form of nonviolent resistance or civil resistance. Someone who practises satyagraha is a satyagrahi.

The term satyagraha was coined and developed by Mahatma Gandhi (1869–1948) as early as 1919. Gandhi practised satyagraha as part of the Indian independence movement and also during his earlier struggles in South Africa for Indian rights. Satyagraha theory influenced Martin Luther King Jr.'s and James Bevel's campaigns during the Civil Rights Movement in the United States, as well as Nelson Mandela's struggle against apartheid in South Africa and many other social-justice and similar movements.

== Principles ==
Gandhi envisioned satyagraha as not only a tactic to be used in acute political struggle but as a universal solvent for injustice and harm.

He founded the Sabarmati Ashram to teach satyagraha. He asked satyagrahis to follow the following principles

1. Nonviolence (ahimsa)
2. Truth – this includes honesty, but goes beyond it to mean living fully in accord with and in devotion to that which is true
3. Not stealing
4. Non-possession (not the same as poverty)
5. Body-labour or bread-labour
6. Control of desires (gluttony)
7. Fearlessness
8. Equal respect for all religions
9. Economic strategy such as boycotts of imported goods (swadeshi)

On another occasion, he listed the following principles as "essential for every Satyagrahi in India":

1. Must have a living faith in God
2. Must be leading a chaste life and be willing to die or lose all his possessions
3. Must be a habitual khadi weaver and spinner
4. Must abstain from alcohol and other intoxicants

== Rules for campaigns ==
Gandhi proposed a series of rules for satyagrahis to follow in a resistance campaign:

1. Harbour no anger.
2. Suffer the anger of the opponent.
3. Never retaliate to assaults or punishment, but do not submit, out of fear of punishment or assault, to an order given in anger.
4. Voluntarily submit to arrest or confiscation of your own property.
5. If you are a trustee of property, defend that property (non-violently) from confiscation with your life.
6. Do not curse or swear.
7. Do not insult the opponent.
8. Neither salute nor insult the flag of your opponent or your opponent's leaders.
9. If anyone attempts to insult or assault your opponent, defend your opponent (non-violently) with your life.
10. As a prisoner, behave courteously and obey prison regulations (except any that are contrary to self-respect).
11. As a prisoner, do not ask for special favourable treatment.
12. As a prisoner, do not fast in an attempt to gain conveniences whose deprivation does not involve any injury to your self-respect.
13. Joyfully obey the orders of the leaders of the civil disobedience action.

== Origin and meaning of name ==
The terms originated in a competition in the news-sheet Indian Opinion in South Africa in 1906. Mr. Maganlal Gandhi, grandson of an uncle of Mahatma Gandhi, came up with the word "Sadagraha" and won the prize. Subsequently, to make it clearer, Gandhi changed it to Satyagraha. "Satyagraha" is a tatpuruṣa compound of the Sanskrit words satya (meaning "truth") and āgraha ("polite insistence", or "holding firmly to"). Satya is derived from the word "sat", which means "being". Nothing is or exists in reality except Truth. In the context of satyagraha, Truth, therefore, includes a) Truth in speech, as opposed to falsehood, b) knowledge of what is real, as opposed to nonexistent (asat), and c) good as opposed to evil or bad. This was critical to Gandhi's understanding of and faith in nonviolence: "The world rests upon the bedrock of satya or truth. Asatya, meaning untruth, also means nonexistent, and satya or truth, also means that which is. If untruth does not so much as exist, its victory is out of the question. And truth being that which is, can never be destroyed. This is the doctrine of satyagraha in a nutshell." For Gandhi, satyagraha went far beyond mere "passive resistance" and became strength in practising non-violent methods. In his words:

Truth (satya) implies love, and firmness (agraha) engenders and therefore serves as a synonym for force. I thus began to call the Indian movement Satyagraha, that is to say, the Force which is born of Truth and Love or non-violence, and gave up the use of the phrase "passive resistance", in connection with it, so much so that even in English writing we often avoided it and used instead the word "satyagraha" itself or some other equivalent English phrase.

In September 1935, in a letter to P. Kodanda Rao, Servants of India Society, Gandhi disputed the proposition that his idea of civil disobedience was adapted from the writings of Henry David Thoreau, especially the essay Civil Disobedience published in 1849.

The statement that I had derived my idea of civil disobedience from the writings of Thoreau is wrong. The resistance to authority in South Africa was well advanced before I got the essay of Thoreau on civil disobedience. But the movement was then known as passive resistance. As it was incomplete, I had coined the word satyagraha for the Gujarati readers. When I saw the title of Thoreau’s great essay, I began the use of his phrase to explain our struggle to the English readers. But I found that even civil disobedience failed to convey the full meaning of the struggle. I therefore adopted the phrase civil resistance. Non-violence was always an integral part of our struggle."

Gandhi described it as follows:

Its root meaning is holding on to truth, hence truth-force. I have also called it love-force or soul-force. In the application of satyagraha, I discovered in the earliest stages that pursuit of truth did not admit of violence being inflicted on one’s opponent but that he must be weaned from error by patience and compassion. For what appears to be truth to the one may appear to be error to the other. And patience means self-suffering. So the doctrine came to mean vindication of truth, not by infliction of suffering on the opponent, but on oneself.

== Contrast to "passive resistance" ==
Gandhi distinguished between satyagraha and passive resistance in the following letter:

I have drawn the distinction between passive resistance as understood and practised in the West and satyagraha before I had evolved the doctrine of the latter to its full logical and spiritual extent. I often used "passive resistance" and "satyagraha" as synonymous terms: but as the doctrine of satyagraha developed, the expression "passive resistance" ceases even to be synonymous, as passive resistance has admitted of violence as in the case of the suffragettes and has been universally acknowledged to be a weapon of the weak. Moreover, passive resistance does not necessarily involve complete adherence to truth under every circumstance. Therefore it is different from satyagraha in three essentials: Satyagraha is a weapon of the strong; it admits of no violence under any circumstance whatsoever; and it ever insists upon truth.

== Relation to ahimsa ==
There is a connection between ahimsa and satyagraha. Satyagraha is sometimes used to refer to the whole principle of nonviolence, where it is essentially the same as ahimsa, and sometimes used in a "marked" meaning to refer specifically to direct action that is largely obstructive, for example in the form of civil disobedience.

Gandhi says:

It is perhaps clear from the foregoing, that without ahimsa it is not possible to seek and find Truth. Ahimsa and Truth are so intertwined that it is practically impossible to disentangle and separate them. They are like the two sides of a coin, or rather of a smooth unstamped metallic disk. Nevertheless, ahimsa is the means; Truth is the end. Means to be means must always be within our reach, and so ahimsa is our supreme duty.

=== Defining success ===
Assessing the extent to which Gandhi's ideas of satyagraha were or were not successful in the Indian independence struggle is a complex task. Judith Brown has suggested that "this is a political strategy and technique which, for its outcomes, depends greatly on historical specificities." The view taken by Gandhi differs from the idea that the goal in any conflict is necessarily to defeat the opponent or frustrate the opponent's objectives, or to meet one's own objectives despite the efforts of the opponent to obstruct these. In satyagraha, by contrast, "The Satyagrahi's object is to convert, not to coerce, the wrong-doer." The opponent must be converted, at least as far as to stop obstructing the just end, for this cooperation to take place. There are cases, to be sure, when an opponent, e.g. a dictator, has to be unseated and one cannot wait to convert him. The satyagrahi would count this a partial success.

=== Means and ends ===
The theory of satyagraha sees means and ends as inseparable. The means to obtain an end are wrapped up in and attached to that end. Therefore, it is contradictory to try to use unjust means to obtain justice or to try to use violence to obtain peace. As Gandhi wrote: "They say, 'means are, after all, means'. I would say, 'means are, after all, everything'. As the means so the end. Separating means and ends would ultimately amount to introducing a form of duality and inconsistency at the core of Gandhi's non-dual (Advaitic) conception.

Gandhi used an example to explain this: "If I want to deprive you of your watch, I shall certainly have to fight for it; if I want to buy your watch, I shall have to pay for it; and if I want a gift, I shall have to plead for it; and, according to the means I employ, the watch is stolen property, my own property, or a donation." Gandhi rejected the idea that injustice should, or even could, be fought against "by any means necessary"—if you use violent, coercive, unjust means, whatever ends you produce will necessarily embed that injustice. However, in Hind Swaraj Gandhi admits that even though his book argues that machinery is bad, it was produced by machinery, which he says can do nothing good. Thus, he says, "sometimes poison is used to kill poison" and for that reason as long as machinery is viewed as bad it can be used to undo itself. This implies that sometimes, bad means can achieve positive ends.

=== Versus duragraha ===
The essence of satyagraha is that it seeks to eliminate antagonisms without harming the antagonists themselves, as opposed to violent resistance, which is meant to cause harm to the antagonist. A satyagrahi therefore does not seek to end or destroy the relationship with the antagonist, but instead seeks to transform or "purify" it to a higher level. A euphemism sometimes used for satyagraha is that it is a "silent force" or a "soul force" (a term also used by Martin Luther King Jr. during his famous "I Have a Dream" speech). It arms the individual with moral power rather than physical power. Satyagraha is also termed a "universal force," as it essentially "makes no distinction between kinsmen and strangers, young and old, man and woman, friend and foe."

Gandhi contrasted satyagraha (holding on to truth) with "duragraha" (holding on by force), as in protest meant more to harass than enlighten opponents. He wrote: "There must be no impatience, no barbarity, no insolence, no undue pressure. If we want to cultivate a true spirit of democracy, we cannot afford to be intolerant. Intolerance betrays want of faith in one's cause."

Civil disobedience and non-cooperation as practised under satyagraha are based on the "law of suffering", a doctrine that the endurance of suffering is a means to an end. This end usually implies a moral uplift or progress of an individual or society. Therefore, the non-cooperation of satyagraha is in fact a means to secure the cooperation of the opponent that is consistent with truth and justice.

== Large-scale usage ==
When using satyagraha in a large-scale political conflict involving civil disobedience, Gandhi believed that the satyagrahis must undergo training to ensure discipline. He wrote that it is "only when people have proved their active loyalty by obeying the many laws of the State that they acquire the right of Civil Disobedience."

He therefore made part of the discipline that satyagrahis:

1. Appreciate the other laws of the State and obey them voluntarily
2. Tolerate these laws, even when they are inconvenient
3. Be willing to undergo suffering, loss of property, and to endure the suffering that might be inflicted on family and friends

This obedience has to be not merely grudging but extraordinary:

...an honest, respectable man will not suddenly take to stealing whether there is a law against stealing or not, but this very man will not feel any remorse for failure to observe the rule about carrying headlights on bicycles after dark.... But he would observe any obligatory rule of this kind, if only to escape the inconvenience of facing a prosecution for a breach of the rule. Such compliance is not, however, the willing and spontaneous obedience that is required of a Satyagrahi.

== American civil rights movement ==
Satyagraha theory also influenced many other movements of nonviolence and civil resistance. For example, Martin Luther King Jr. wrote about Gandhi's influence on his developing ideas regarding the civil rights movement in the United States:

Like most people, I had heard of Gandhi, but I had never studied him seriously. As I read I became deeply fascinated by his campaigns of nonviolent resistance. I was particularly moved by his Salt March to the Sea and his numerous fasts. The whole concept of Satyagraha (Satya is truth which equals love, and agraha is force; Satyagraha, therefore, means truth force or love force) was profoundly significant to me. As I delved deeper into the philosophy of Gandhi, my skepticism concerning the power of love gradually diminished, and I came to see for the first time its potency in the area of social reform. ... It was in this Gandhian emphasis on love and nonviolence that I discovered the method for social reform that I had been seeking.

== In relation to genocide ==
In view of the Nazi persecution of the Jews in Germany, Gandhi offered satyagraha as a method of combating oppression and genocide, stating:

If I were a Jew and were born in Germany and earned my livelihood there, I would claim Germany as my home even as the tallest Gentile German might, and challenge him to shoot me or cast me in the dungeon; I would refuse to be expelled or to submit to discriminating treatment. And for doing this I should not wait for the fellow Jews to join me in civil resistance, but would have confidence that in the end the rest were bound to follow my example. If one Jew or all the Jews were to accept the prescription here offered, he or they cannot be worse off than now. And suffering voluntarily undergone will bring them an inner strength and joy ... the calculated violence of Hitler may even result in a general massacre of the Jews by way of his first answer to the declaration of such hostilities. But if the Jewish mind could be prepared for voluntary suffering, even the massacre I have imagined could be turned into a day of thanksgiving and joy that Jehovah had wrought deliverance of the race even at the hands of the tyrant. For to the God-fearing, death has no terror.

When Gandhi was criticized for these statements, he responded in another article entitled "Some Questions Answered":

Friends have sent me two newspaper cuttings criticizing my appeal to the Jews. The two critics suggest that in presenting non-violence to the Jews as a remedy against the wrong done to them, I have suggested nothing new... What I have pleaded for is renunciation of violence of the heart and consequent active exercise of the force generated by the great renunciation.

In a similar vein, anticipating a possible attack on India by Japan during World War II, Gandhi recommended satyagraha as a means of national defense (what is now sometimes called "civilian-based defense" (CBD) or "social defence"):

...there should be unadulterated non-violent non-cooperation, and if the whole of India responded and unanimously offered it, I should show that, without shedding a single drop of blood, Japanese arms—or any combination of arms—can be sterilized. That involves the determination of India not to give quarter on any point whatsoever and to be ready to risk loss of several million lives. But I would consider that cost very cheap and victory won at that cost glorious. That India may not be ready to pay that price may be true. I hope it is not true, but some such price must be paid by any country that wants to retain its independence. After all, the sacrifice made by the Russians and the Chinese is enormous, and they are ready to risk all. The same could be said of the other countries also, whether aggressors or defenders. The cost is enormous. Therefore, in the non-violent technique I am asking India to risk no more than other countries are risking and which India would have to risk even if she offered armed resistance.

== See also ==
- Ahimsa in Jainism
- Civil disobedience
- Constructive Program
- Gandhi Heritage Portal
- Nonviolence
- Nonviolent resistance
- Nonviolent revolution
- People Power Revolution
- Resistance movement
- Salt March
- Sit-in
