= Pranjivan Mehta =

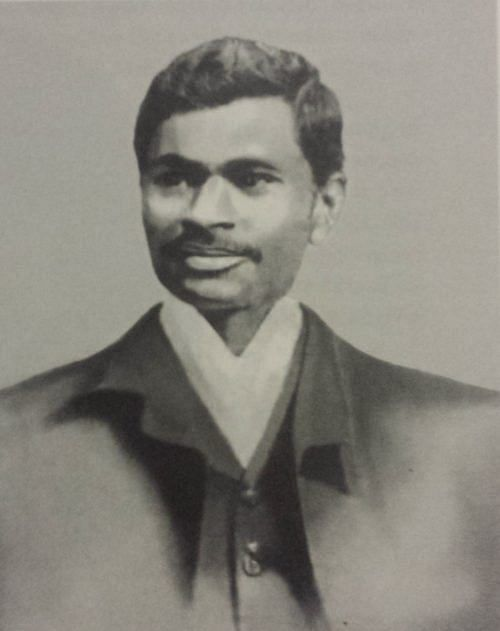

Pranjivandas Jagjivandas Mehta (1864 – 3 August 1932) was a Mumbai-born physician, lawyer and jeweller who settled in Burma. He was a close friend of Mahatma Gandhi, helping Gandhi in England, helping him return from South Africa to India and sponsoring him. He also helped Gandhi articulate and elucidate his vision of India in the Hind Swaraj which was written primarily for Mehta (who is indicated as the "Reader"). In 1909 he wrote a letter to Gokhale recognising Gandhi as a Mahatma (a great soul), well before Gandhi was given that title.

== Life and work ==
Mehta was born in Morvi, the youngest of four brothers, into a wealthy Jain business family with roots in Kathiawar, Gujarat. An older brother, Revashankar "Jhaveri" Jagjivan Mehta who had been a lawyer of repute to the Raja of Morvi later set up a jewellery shop in Kalpadevi. After studies at Morbi and Rajkot, Pranjivan went to the Grant Medical College and received a LMS with a gold medal in 1886. With a state scholarship he went to the University of Brussels in 1887 and received an MD in 1889 specializing in surgery. At the same time he studied law and was called to the Bar in the Middle Temple in London in 1890. He returned to India and was a private physician before becoming medical officer for Idar State. It was while he was in London studying for the Middle Temple that Mohandas Gandhi came to hear of him and the two met for the first time in September 1888.

In 1899 Mehta moved to Rangoon where he joined the family diamond business of Maganlal Pranjivan and Co. Gandhi moved to South Africa in 1893. Mehta was involved with the Burmese nationalists, and numerous social activities such as the Hindu Social Club, the Burma Provincial Congress Committee and was the founder of the Anglo-Gujarati newspaper United Burma edited by V. Madanjit who earlier published the Indian Opinion from Durban. Mehta and Gandhi corresponded a great deal but Mehta had instructed Gandhi to destroy his letters once they had been read leading to a lack of record. Gandhi visited Burma in 1929 and stayed at Mehta's home near the Shwedagon Pagoda. Gandhi considered Mehta an intellectual giant and it was Mehta who introduced Gandhi to his primary spiritual guide, Shrimad Rajchandra whom Gandhi lists as one of his primary influences in his autobiography. Mehta also introduced Gandhi to the writings of Tolstoy. Mehta was an anti-vaccinationist and wrote in 1899 that sanitation was a greater need in the protection against smallpox. He again opposed vaccination of immigrants into Burma.
