= RMS Kildonan Castle =

1899 Royal Mail Ship and passenger liner

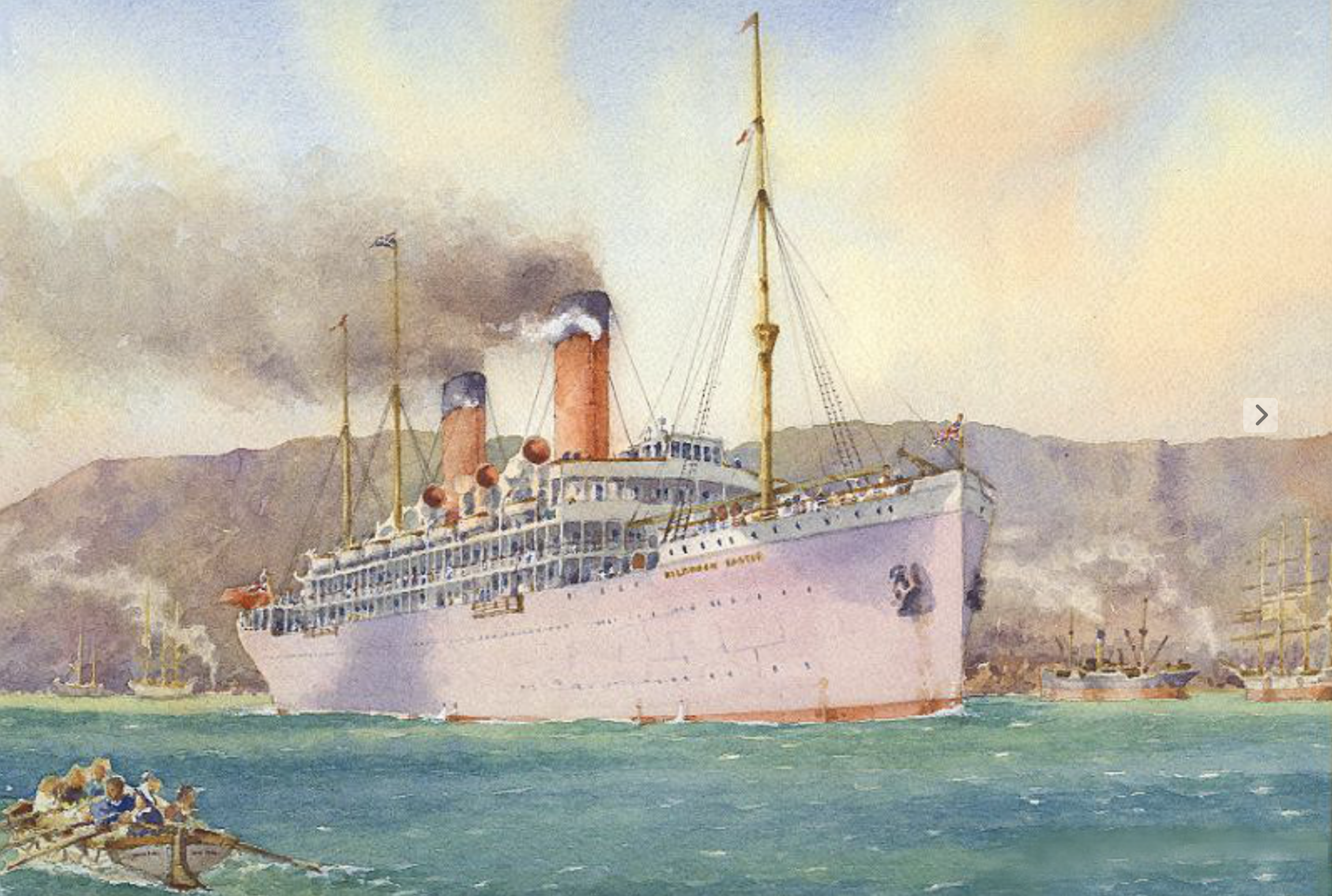
- RMS Kildonan Castle

History

United Kingdom
- Name: Kildonan Castle
- Owner: Union-Castle Line
- Builder: Fairfield Shipbuilding and Engineering Company, Limited, Glasgow
- Yard number: 408
- Launched: 22 August 1899
- Completed: 1899
- Commissioned: December 1899
- Decommissioned: 1931
- Renamed: H. M. Transport 44 / Pennant MI 74
- Fate: Broken up 18 May 1931
- Notes: Requisitioned in two wars

General characteristics
- Tonnage: 9,652 GRT; 5,105 NRT
- Length: 515 ft. 3 in.
- Beam: 59 ft 2 in (18.03 m)
- Depth: 34.7 ft.
- Installed power: 1,663 nhp
- Propulsion: As built: Steel Screw Steamer; 2 Stroke Double Acting engine; 2 × Steam 4 cylinder (28, 39.75, 57.5, 82 x 60in), 2-Screw
- Speed: Cruising: 17 kn (31 km/h; 20 mph); Max: 18 kn (33 km/h; 21 mph)
- Capacity: As built: unk. first class passengers; unk. second class passengers; unk. third class passengers
- Armament: As armed merchant cruiser; 8 × 4.7-inch guns (later 8 6-inch guns)

The RMS Kildonan Castle was a Royal Mail Ship and passenger liner that went into service with Castle Line, and its successor, the Union-Castle Line. She was built to run the mail route from Southampton, England to Cape Town, South Africa starting in 1900. However, she began her life early, in December 1899, being requisitioned by the government to carry 3,000 troops to Cape Town at the start of the Boer War, and was temporarily used in South Africa to house POW's. She returned to England in 1901 for an outfitting to carry passengers and mail. She was one of nine ships on the England-South Africa run. At the outbreak of World War I, she replenished the South African Army with arms and ammunition. She also served as a hospital ship during the Dardanelles Campaign, outfitted with 603 beds, and converted in March 1916 to an armed merchant cruiser. In January 1917, she took Lord Milner and 51 VIP delegates from England, France and Italy to Murmansk, Russia, on the Petrograd Mission. She then undertook convoy duties in the North Atlantic, returning to her normal South African mail run after the war.

Mahatma Gandhi wrote the seminal text of Indian independence, Hind Swaraj or Indian Home Rule, onboard RMS Kildonan Castle between November 13 and November 22, 1909 while traveling from London to South Africa.

During the Roaring 20's, the Kildonan Castle was one of 38 ships in the Union-Castle Line fleet. She was retired in 1930.
