= Young India =

Journal by Mahatma Gandhi, 1919 to 1931

Young India by Lala Lajpat Rai

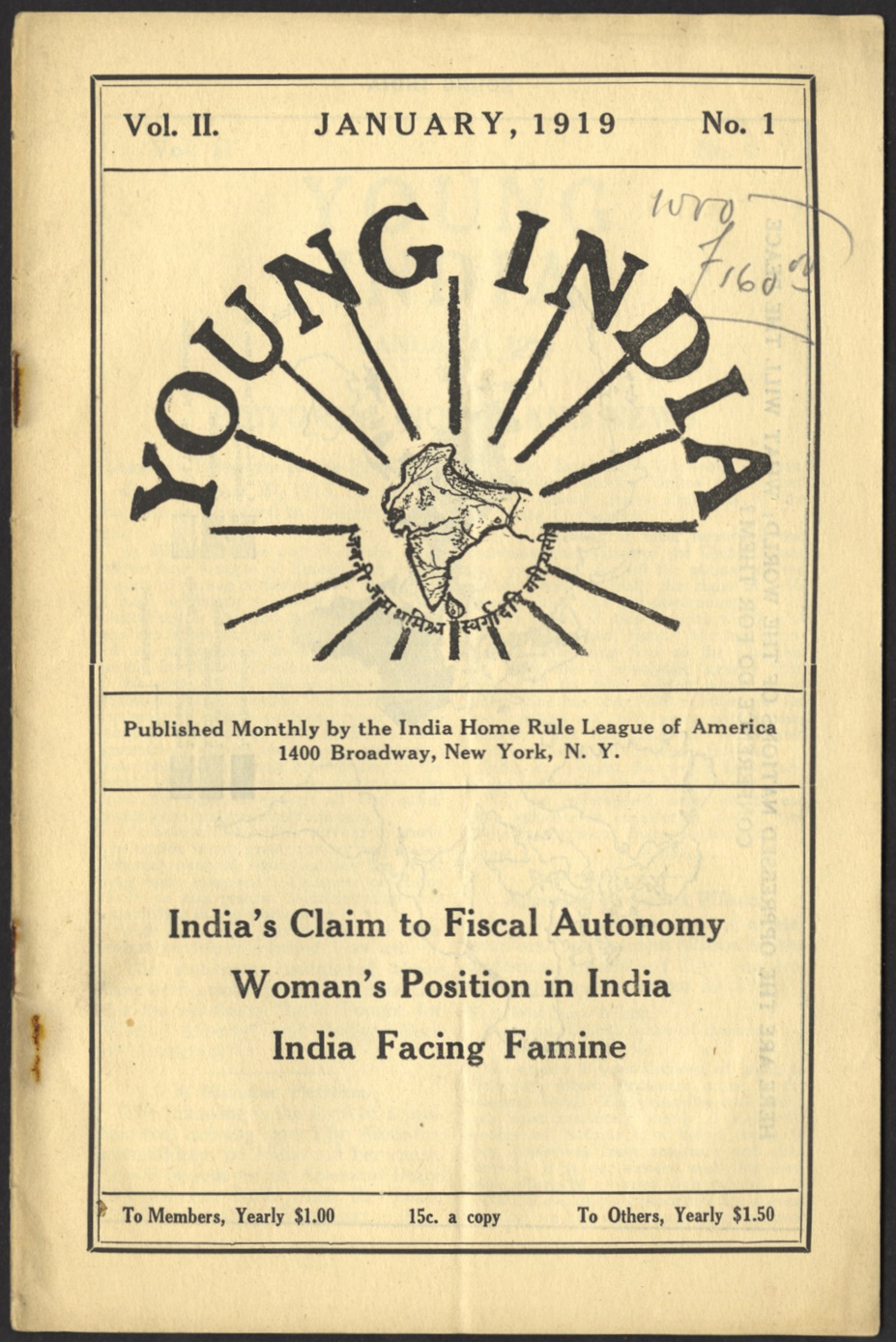
Young India

Young India was a book written by Lala Lajpat Rai in 1916 and a periodical published by Mahatma Gandhi from 1919 to 1931.

== Introduction ==
An analysis of the Indian nationalist movement is presented in this book. It provides a thorough account of India's political development by following its history from 1757 to 1857 and then from the 1857 revolt to 1905. Later, the author expanded the work's scope and usefulness by adding developments up to 1915.

The book gives a thorough description of the socioeconomic circumstances of the era as well as the slow rise in popular awareness of the country. Additionally, it successfully refutes British colonial assertions that India was a welfare state.

Because of this, it continues to be a crucial tool for comprehending the Indian independence movement and is a worthwhile read for the current generation from one of India's most respected liberation warriors.

=== Overview ===
The book provides a comprehensive narrative of Indian history, nationalism, and socio-political transformations from the mid-18th century to the early 20th century. It covers:

- The establishment and consolidation of British rule in India (1757–1857)
- The Great Revolt of 1857 and its aftermath
- The rise of political consciousness from 1857 to 1905
- The formation and evolution of the Indian National Congress
- The emergence of the "New Nationalist" movement, including Swadeshi and Swaraj
- The role of socio-religious reform movements such as the Arya Samaj and Brahmo Samaj

Rai analyses the economic and political effects of British colonialism, arguing that the colonial state drained India’s wealth, suppressed political liberties, and damaged indigenous institutions. He strongly disputes British claims of acting as a benevolent "welfare state" for Indians.

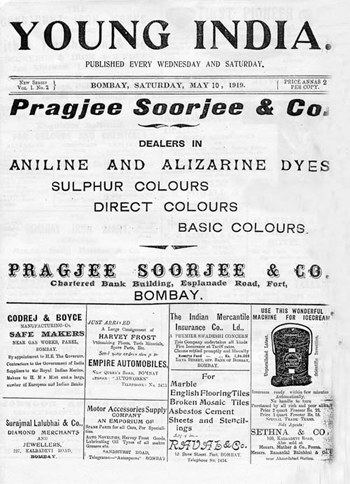
A Young India copy from 1919

=== Themes ===
1. Critique of British Rule

Rai rejects the idea that British governance uplifted India, instead arguing that it resulted in economic decline, political disempowerment, and cultural misrepresentation. He portrays British rule as exploitative, racially discriminatory, and dismissive of Indian capacities.

2. Advocacy of Self-Rule

A central theme of the book is the assertion that Indians were fully capable of managing their own affairs. Rai emphasises India's long civilisational history, administrative traditions, and examples of past political unity to counter colonial claims of Indian incompetence.

3. Rise of National Consciousness

The book traces the growth of modern nationalism through education, the press, public movements, and the actions of reformers and revolutionaries. Rai examines both moderate and extremist approaches within the nationalist spectrum.

4. Socio-economic Conditions

Rai documents the socio-economic realities of the time, including recurring famines, high taxation, industrial decline, unequal trade policies, and widespread poverty. He argues that such conditions helped fuel nationalist sentiment.

5. International Dimension

The book includes commentary on global events—such as the First World War—and their impact on India. Rai compares India's struggle to other nationalist movements worldwide and critiques Western misunderstandings of Indian society and religion.

=== Idea of Swaraj ===
It was also the basis for Lala Lajpat Rai's contribution to the final edition of The Seven Arts in Oct 2017. Through this work, Mahatma Gandhi sought to popularize India's demand for independence or Swaraj.

=== Independence ===
Gandhi used Young India to spread his unique ideology and thoughts regarding the use of nonviolence in organising movements and to urge readers to consider, organise, and plan for India's eventual independence from the British Empire.

=== Harijan ===
In 1933 Gandhi started publishing a weekly newspaper, Harijan, in English. Harijan, which means "People of God", was also Gandhi's term for the untouchable caste. The newspaper lasted until 1948. During this time Gandhi also published Harijan Bandu in Gujarati, and Harijan Sevak in Hindi. All three papers focused on social and economic problems, both in India and elsewhere in the world.

=== See also ===
- Gandhi Heritage Portal, portal to preserve, and protect the works of Mahatma Gandhi
