= Indian Opinion =

Weekly newspaper started by MK Gandhi

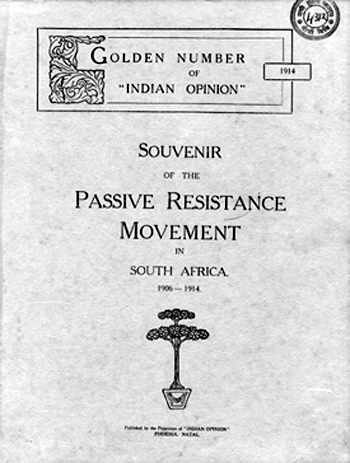
Indian Opinion

The Indian Opinion was a newspaper established by Indian independence leader Mahatma Gandhi. The publication was an important tool for the political movement led by Gandhi and the Natal Indian Congress to fight racial discrimination and again civil rights for the Indian community and the native Africans in South Africa. Starting in 1903, it continued its publication until 1961.

The location of the newspaper, known as Phoenix Settlement was declared a National Heritage Site by the South African government in 2020.

== History ==
In the 19th century, Indians started to be brought to South Africa as indentured servants to fill the growing demands of the South African economy. Alongside various multi-ethnic communities, the Indian community suffered from significant political, economic and social discrimination, administered by a precursor of apartheid. In the aftermath of the Boer War, the government of Boer general Jan Smuts introduced significant restrictions on the civil rights of the Indian immigrant community, giving the police power to warrantless search, seizures and arrests. All Indians were required to carry identification and registration cards at all times. Working as a lawyer in the Natal province, Gandhi organized the publication in 1904 with the aim of educating European communities in South Africa about Indian needs and issues.

With the support of the Natal Indian Congress, his clients and other notable Indians, Gandhi assembled a small staff and printing press. Madanjit Viyavaharik, the owner of the International Printing Press and the first issue was out on June 4, 1903, and hit the streets two days later. The newspaper was published in Gujarati, Hindi, Tamil and English. Mansukhlal Nazar, the secretary of the Natal Congress served as its editor and a key organiser. In 1904, Gandhi relocated the publishing office to his settlement in Phoenix, located close to Durban. At Phoenix, the press workers were governed by a new work ethic - they would all have a share in the land, in the profits if there were any, they would grow crops to sustain themselves and they would work jointly to produce Indian Opinion. The newspaper's editors included Hebert Kitchin, Henry Polak, Albert West, Manilal Gandhi, who was the paper's longest serving editor (for 36 years), and Sushila Gandhi, wife of Manilal who took over after his death. All but one of its editors spent some time in jail.

== Reports ==
The Indian Opinion began by adopting a very moderate tone, reiterating its faith in common law and seeking not to provoke the hostility of the officials in Smuts's administration. However, the Indian Opinion especially highlighted the poor conditions under which indentured labourers worked. Editorials tackled the discrimination and harsh conditions prevalent in the agricultural estates where indentured Indians were employed. Cases of harsh treatment by employers were publicized and the astoundingly high rate of suicide amongst Indians was pointed out. A campaign to end the system was launched and editor Henry Polak, a friend of Gandhi's, went to India to mobilise support. From 1906 onwards it became a vehicle for challenging state laws and urging defiance of these when these were clearly unjust. This tradition began during the satyagraha campaign between 1906 and 1913 which began because of attempts to impose passes on Indians in the Transvaal.

The paper also used to cover reports on discrimination against Africans by the colonial regime. In a publication of the paper from 22 October 1910, Gandhi wrote:

"The Africans are alone are the original inhabitants of this land. We have not seized the land from them force; we live here with their goodwill. The whites, on the other hand, have occupied the country forcibly and appropriated it to themselves."

The newspaper also gave prominence to the African Women‘s struggle in Orange Free State. It supported John Langalibalele Dube criticism of the Natives Land Act.

The paper played a fundamental role in defeating the registration drive of officials. Its pages paid tribute to local resisters and Brian Gabriel, one of Natal's earliest Indian photographers, provided visual coverage.

== Legacy ==
The Indian Opinion was a means of bringing news about Indians in the colonies before the public in India. The pages of Indian Opinion provide a valuable historical record of the disabilities that Indians suffered under. It also provides an invaluable record of the political life of the Indian community. Gandhi's experience with the publication and the political struggle in South Africa proved a major experience for him that helped him in his work for the Indian independence movement. He commented "Satyagraha would have been impossible without Indian Opinion."

The paper is also remembered for its coverage of racial discrimination faced by native Africans.

In India, Gandhi would publish Young India, Harijan, and Navjivan. Indian Opinion continued to publish for many decades and played a significant role in the wider civil rights struggle of South Africa. But it also suffered from not being a commercial enterprise but rather a publication committed to serving social causes.

The location of the newspaper, known as Phoenix Settlement was restored in 2000. It was declared a National Heritage Site by the South African government in 2020.

== See also ==
- Gandhi Heritage Portal
