= Gandhi (film) =

1982 film by Richard Attenborough

- Theatrical release poster
- Directed by: Richard Attenborough
- Written by: John Briley
- Produced by: Richard Attenborough
- Starring: Ben Kingsley; Candice Bergen; Edward Fox; John Gielgud; Trevor Howard; John Mills; Martin Sheen
- Cinematography: Billy Williams; Ronnie Taylor
- Edited by: John Bloom
- Music by: Ravi Shankar; George Fenton
- Production companies: Goldcrest Films; International Film Investors; National Film Development Corporation of India; Indo-British Films
- Distributed by: Columbia Pictures (through Columbia-EMI-Warner Distributors in the United Kingdom)
- Release dates: 30 November 1982 (New Delhi); 3 December 1982 (United Kingdom)
- Running time: 191 minutes
- Countries: United Kingdom; India
- Languages: English; Hindi
- Budget: $22 million
- Box office: $127.8 million

Gandhi is a 1982 biographical film directed and produced by Richard Attenborough and written by John Briley. It is based on the life of Mahatma Gandhi (portrayed by Ben Kingsley), a major leader in the Indian independence movement against the British Empire during the 20th century. It covers Gandhi's life from a defining moment in 1893, as he is thrown off a train in the Colony of Natal for being in a whites-only compartment and concludes with his assassination and funeral in 1948. Although a practising Hindu, Gandhi's embracing of other faiths, particularly Christianity and Islam, is also depicted. Over 300,000 extras appeared in the film, believed to be the most in any film made.

Gandhi was released by Columbia Pictures in India on 30 November 1982, in the United Kingdom on 3 December, and in the United States on 8 December. It was praised for its portrayal of the life of Gandhi, the Indian independence movement, and the deleterious results of British colonisation on India.

It was considered to have maintained a reasonable level of historical accuracy, although many separate events were amalgamated, such as historical meetings with individual people being combined into single fictionalized scenes for narrative pacing. Several events were exaggerated or invented, such as being beaten by police while burning registration certificates. The chronology of Gandhi's early activism was altered, and certain historical figures (such as Christian missionary and independence activist C.F. Andrews and founder of Pakistan Mohammad Ali Jinnah) were considered to have been portrayed inaccurately. The film was praised for conveying Gandhi's core principles of nonviolence and human dignity effectively, providing an accessible introduction to his life and message.

Its production values, costume design, and Kingsley's performance received worldwide critical acclaim. It became a commercial success, grossing $127.8 million on a $22 million budget. It received a leading eleven nominations at the 55th Academy Awards, winning eight, including Best Picture, Best Director, and Best Actor (for Kingsley). The British Film Institute ranked it as the 34th greatest British film of the 20th century. The American Film Institute ranked the film 29th on its list of most inspiring movies.

== Plot ==
While heading to afternoon prayers in New Delhi on January 30, 1948, Gandhi is fatally shot.

On 7 June 1893, in the Colony of Natal, young lawyer Mohandas Gandhi is forcibly expelled from a whites-only train carriage in Pietermaritzburg despite possessing a valid ticket, subsequently campaigning for racial equality among whites and Indians in both the Colony of Natal and the Cape Colony. Dada Abdullah, president of the Natal Indian Congress, notices his campaign and invites him to a demonstration where he burns his pass. After the Second Boer War, the British Empire attempts to have Indians fingerprinted like criminals in its African colonies. Gandhi responds with peaceful demonstrations, but is arrested. The government releases Gandhi and relents by granting some rights to Indians, fulfilling his short-term goal. Anglican clergyman Charles Freer Andrews joins his mission, and American journalist Vince Walker takes special interest in him. Gandhi works at his ashram alongside associates such as Andrews, Hermann Kallenbuch, and later Mirabehn.

Gandhi returns to India in 1915 where he is invited to the Indian National Congress (INC), led by Sardar Patel, Jawaharlal Nehru, Maulana Azad, Muhammad Ali Jinnah, who is advocating India's self-rule, and Gopal Krishna Gokhale, who becomes his mentor. Jinnah supports Gandhi's involvement but opposes his unconventional approach. At a meeting of the Congress, Gandhi's speech captivates the ensemble, especially Patel.

Gandhi pledges allegiance to the British Empire in World War I, but simultaneously demands self-rule. His satyagrahas at Champaran and Kheda are brutally curtailed by the British. Despite India's wartime involvement, the administration passes the Rowlatt Act in 1919, which the movement sees as betrayal. While a crowd listens to speeches about freedom, Colonel Reginald Dyer orders his mostly Gurkha troops to fire upon them in what becomes the Jallianwala Bagh massacre.

Jinnah suggests non-cooperation to protesting British rule, and Gandhi surprisingly agrees. Its immediate success causes protesters to kill and burn police officers in what becomes the Chauri Chaura incident. Disgusted, Gandhi calls off the non-cooperation movement, enraging Jinnah, quelling the masses by fasting.

In 1930, Gandhi is arrested and sent to prison because of his Salt March to defy the British monopoly on India's salt. After being released, Gandhi is invited to London by Ramsay MacDonald to attend the Round Table conferences regarding future Dominion status for India. However, they prove fruitless, and Gandhi and the other Congress leaders are imprisoned during World War II. While under house arrest, Gandhi's wife Kasturba dies.

Dissatisfied by the Congress and Gandhi, Jinnah resigns and returns to the Muslim League, where he begins the Pakistan Movement's demands for the Muslim minority's secession to form Pakistan, against Gandhi's wishes. In 1945, Viceroy Louis Mountbatten declares India's upcoming independence. Gandhi offers Jinnah the Prime Ministry and choice of cabinet. Nehru accepts the offer to maintain independence, but Jinnah declines, stating that only Pakistani independence with him as leader will ensure Muslim safety.

India and Pakistan finally gain their independence in August 1947, and millions of people migrate into the two newly formed countries, but sectarian violence between Hindus and Muslims erupts. The Indian military attempts to control uprisings in Delhi and Bombay while Calcutta devolves into chaos. Devastated, Gandhi once again calms the violence by fasting. Gandhi advises a concerned Hindu man, upset about murdering a Muslim infant to avenge his son's death in the violence, to find a similarly orphaned Muslim boy and raise him as a faithful Muslim.

The film shifts to Gandhi's assassination. His casket is carted throughout New Delhi with the mourning party of Nehru (now Prime Minister), numerous citizens, government officials, and international dignitaries. After cremation, his ashes are poured into the Ganges, and he is mourned by the leaders of the Congress and the wider Indian independence movement.

== Cast ==
- Ben Kingsley as Mahatma Gandhi
- Rohini Hattangadi as Kasturba Gandhi
- Roshan Seth as Jawaharlal Nehru
- Saeed Jaffrey as Vallabhbhai Patel
- Virendra Razdan as Maulana Azad
- Candice Bergen as Margaret Bourke-White
- Jane Myerson as Lady Mountbatten
- Edward Fox as Brigadier General Reginald Dyer
- Habib Tanvir as Sir Chimanlal Harilal Setalvad, an Indian barrister
- John Gielgud as Viceroy Lord Irwin
- Trevor Howard as Justice Robert Stonehouse Broomfield
- John Mills as Viceroy Lord Chelmsford
- Shane Rimmer as Edward R. Murrow
- Martin Sheen as Vince Walker, a fictional journalist based partially on Webb Miller
- Ian Charleson as Charles Freer Andrews, an Anglican priest
- Athol Fugard as General Jan Smuts
- David Gant as Daniels
- Gareth Forwood as secretary
- Geraldine James as Mirabehn (Madeleine Slade)
- Alyque Padamsee as Muhammad Ali Jinnah
- Amrish Puri as Dada Abdulla Hajee Adab, President of the Natal Indian Congress
- Ian Bannen as senior officer Fields
- Richard Griffiths as Collins, Walker's colleague
- Nigel Hawthorne as Mr Kinnoch
- Richard Vernon as Sir Edward Gait, Lieutenant-Governor of Bihar and Orissa
- Michael Hordern as Sir George Hodge
- Shreeram Lagoo as Gopal Krishna Gokhale
- Terrence Hardiman as Ramsay MacDonald, Prime Minister of the United Kingdom
- Om Puri as Nahari, a rioter
- Dalip Tahil as Zia, a Satyagrahi
- Daniel Day-Lewis as Colin
- Ray Burdis as youth
- Daniel Peacock as youth
- Avis Bunnage as Colin's mother
- Dominic Guard as subaltern
- Bernard Hill as Sergeant Putnam
- John Ratzenberger as American driver for Bourke-White
- Pankaj Mohan as Gandhi's first secretary, Mahadev Desai
- Pankaj Kapur as Gandhi's second secretary, Pyarelal Nayyar
- Anang Desai as J. B. Kripalani
- Dilsher Singh as Abdul Ghaffar Khan
- Günther Maria Halmer as Hermann Kallenbach
- Peter Harlowe as Lord Mountbatten
- Harsh Nayyar as Nathuram Godse, Gandhi's assassin
- Vijay Kashyap as Narayan Apte, partner of Godse
- Supriya Pathak as Manu, cousin grandniece of Gandhi
- Neena Gupta as Abha, cousin grandniece-in-law of Gandhi
- Tom Alter as a doctor at Aga Khan Palace
- Alok Nath as Tyeb Mohammad, a member of the Natal Indian Congress
- Mohan Agashe as Tyeb Mohammad's associate
- Shekhar Chatterjee as Huseyn Suhrawardy
- John Savident as manager of the mine
- Vijay Crishna as chauffeur

== Production ==
This film had been Richard Attenborough's dream project, although two previous attempts at filming had failed. In 1952, Gabriel Pascal secured an agreement with the Prime Minister of India (Jawaharlal Nehru) to produce a film of Gandhi's life. However, Pascal died in 1954 before preparations were completed.

In 1962, Attenborough was contacted by Motilal Kothari, an Indian-born civil servant working with the Indian High Commission in London and a devout follower of Gandhi. Kothari insisted that Attenborough meet him to discuss a film about Gandhi. Attenborough agreed, after reading Louis Fischer's biography of Gandhi and spent the next 18 years attempting to get the film made. He was able to meet prime minister Nehru and his daughter Indira Gandhi through a connection with Lord Louis Mountbatten, the last Viceroy of India. Nehru approved of the film and promised to help support its production, but his death in 1964 was one of the film's many setbacks. Attenborough would dedicate the film to the memory of Kothari, Mountbatten, and Nehru.

David Lean and Sam Spiegel had planned to make a film about Gandhi after completing The Bridge on the River Kwai, reportedly with Alec Guinness as Gandhi. Ultimately, the project was abandoned in favour of Lawrence of Arabia (1962). Attenborough reluctantly approached Lean with his own Gandhi project in the late 1960s, and Lean agreed to direct the film and offered Attenborough the lead role. Instead Lean began filming Ryan's Daughter, during which time Motilal Kothari died and the project fell apart.

Attenborough again attempted to resurrect the project in 1976 with backing from Warner Bros. Then prime minister Indira Gandhi declared a state of emergency in India and filming would be impossible. Co-producer Rani Dube persuaded prime minister Indira Gandhi to provide the first $10 million from the National Film Development Corporation of India, chaired by D. V. S. Raju at that time, on the back of which the remainder of the funding was finally raised. Finally, in 1980 Attenborough was able to secure the remainder of the funding needed to make the film. Screenwriter John Briley had introduced him to Jake Eberts, the chief executive at the new Goldcrest production company that raised approximately two-thirds of the film's budget.

Filming began on 26 November 1980 and ended on 10 May 1981. Some scenes were shot near Koilwar Bridge, in Bihar. Over 300,000 extras were used in the funeral scene, the most for any film, according to Guinness World Records.

The film was shot on 35mm anamorphic equipment using Panavision cameras and lenses. For theatrical release, it was projected using either 35mm anamorphic prints with a 2.39:1 aspect ratio and Dolby stereo sound, or 70mm anamorphic prints with a 2.2:1 aspect ration and six discrete sound tracks.

=== Casting ===
During pre-production, there was much speculation as to who would play the role of Gandhi. The choice was Ben Kingsley, who is partly of Indian heritage (his father was Gujarati and his birth name is Krishna Bhanji).

== Release ==
Gandhi premiered in New Delhi, India, on 30 November 1982. Two days later, on 2 December, it had a Royal Premiere at the Odeon Leicester Square in London in the presence of Prince Charles and Princess Diana before opening to the public the following day. The film had a limited release in the US starting on Wednesday, 8 December 1982, followed by a wider release in January 1983. In February 1983, it opened on two screens in India, nationwide in the UK, and in other countries.

== Reception ==
=== Critical response ===
Review aggregator website Rotten Tomatoes retrospectively collected 111 reviews and judged 89% of them to be positive, with an average rating of 8.30/10. The website's critical consensus reads: "Director Richard Attenborough is typically sympathetic and sure-handed, but it's Ben Kingsley's magnetic performance that acts as the linchpin for this sprawling, lengthy biopic." Metacritic gave the film a score of 79 out of 100 based on 16 critical reviews, indicating "generally favorable reviews". CinemaScore reported that audiences gave the film a rare "A+" grade. In 2010, the Independent Film & Television Alliance selected the film as one of the 30 Most Significant Independent Films of the last 30 years.

Reviews were broadly positive worldwide. The film was discussed or reviewed in Newsweek, Time, the Washington Post, The Public Historian, Cross Currents, The Journal of Asian Studies, Film Quarterly, The Progressive, The Christian Century and elsewhere. Ben Kingsley's performance was especially praised. Among the few who took a more negative view of the film, historian Lawrence James called it "pure hagiography" while anthropologist Akhil Gupta said it "suffers from tepid direction and a superficial and misleading interpretation of history." Also Indian novelist Makarand R. Paranjape has written that "Gandhi, though hagiographical, follow a mimetic style of film-making in which cinema, the visual image itself, is supposed to portray or reflect 'reality'". The film was also criticised by some right-wing commentators who objected to the film's advocacy of nonviolence, including Pat Buchanan, Emmett Tyrrell and Richard Grenier. In Time, Richard Schickel wrote that in portraying Gandhi's "spiritual presence... Kingsley is nothing short of astonishing." A "singular virtue" of the film is that "its title figure is also a character in the usual dramatic sense of the term." Schickel viewed Attenborough's directorial style as having "a conventional handsomeness that is more predictable than enlivening", but this "stylistic self-denial serves to keep one's attention fastened where it belongs: on a persuasive, if perhaps debatable vision of Gandhi's spirit, and on the remarkable actor who has caught its light in all its seasons." Roger Ebert gave the film four stars and called it a "remarkable experience", and placed it fifth on his 10 best films of 1983.

In Newsweek, Jack Kroll stated that "There are very few movies that absolutely must be seen. Sir Richard Attenborough's Gandhi is one of them." The movie "deals with a subject of great importance... with a mixture of high intelligence and immediate emotional impact... [and] Ben Kingsley... gives what is possibly the most astonishing biographical performance in screen history." Kroll stated that the screenplay's "least persuasive characters are Gandhi's Western allies and acolytes" such as an English cleric and an American journalist, but that "Attenborough's 'old-fashioned' style is exactly right for the no-tricks, no-phony-psychologizing quality he wants." Furthermore, Attenborough

mounts a powerful challenge to his audience by presenting Gandhi as the most profound and effective of revolutionaries, creating out of a fierce personal discipline a chain reaction that led to tremendous historical consequences. At a time of deep political unrest, economic dislocation and nuclear anxiety, seeing "Gandhi" is an experience that will change many minds and hearts.

According to the Museum of Broadcast Communications there was "a cycle of film and television productions which emerged during the first half of the 1980s, which seemed to indicate Britain's growing preoccupation with India, Empire and a particular aspect of British cultural history". In addition to Gandhi, this cycle also included Heat and Dust (1983), Octopussy (1983), The Jewel in the Crown (1984), The Far Pavilions (1984) and A Passage to India (1984).

Patrick French negatively reviewed the film, writing in The Telegraph:

An important origin of one myth about Gandhi was Richard Attenborough's 1982 film. Take the episode when the newly arrived Gandhi is ejected from a first-class railway carriage at Pietermaritzburg after a white passenger objects to sharing space with a "coolie" (an Indian indentured labourer). In fact, Gandhi's demand to be allowed to travel first-class was accepted by the railway company. Rather than marking the start of a campaign against racial oppression, as legend has it, this episode was the start of a campaign to extend racial segregation in South Africa. Gandhi was adamant that "respectable Indians" should not be obliged to use the same facilities as "raw Kaffirs". He petitioned the authorities in the port city of Durban, where he practised law, to end the indignity of making Indians use the same entrance to the post office as blacks, and counted it a victory when three doors were introduced: one for Europeans, one for Asiatics and one for Natives.

Richard Grenier in his 1983 article, The Gandhi Nobody Knows, which was also the title of the book of the same name and topic, also criticized the film, arguing it misportrayed him as a "saint". He also alleged the Indian government admitted to financing about a third of the film's budget. He also criticized the film's portrayal of Muhammed Ali Jinnah, although he does not elaborate much on this criticism. Grenier's book later became an inspiration for G. B. Singh's book Gandhi: Behind the Mask of Divinity. Parts of the book also discuss the film negatively.

One notable person, Mark Boyle (better known as "The Moneyless Man") has stated that watching the film was the moment that changed his life and said that after that, he took Mahatma Gandhi's message of peace and non-violence to heart and that the film inspired him to become an activist.

The film was included by the Vatican in a list of important films compiled in 1995, under the category of "Values". In 2016, the Directors Guild of America ranked the film 67th on its list of The 80 Best-Directed Films since the Guild’s founding in 1936.

=== Box office ===
The film grossed $81,917 in its first 6 days at the Odeon Leicester Square in London. In the United States and Canada, it grossed $183,583 in its first 5 days from 4 theatres (Ziegfeld Theatre in New York City; Uptown Theater in Washington D.C.; Century Plaza in Los Angeles; and the York in Toronto). Due to the running time, it could be shown only three times a day. It went on to gross US$52,767,889 in the United States and Canada, the 12th highest-grossing film of 1982.

Outside of the United States and Canada, the film grossed US$75 million in the rest of the world, the third highest for the year.

In the United Kingdom, the film grossed £7.7 million (£22.3 million adjusted for inflation). It is one of the top ten highest-grossing British independent films of all time adjusted for inflation.

In India, it was one of the highest-grossing films of all-time (and the highest for a foreign film) during the time of its release by earning over ₹100 crore or 1 billion rupees. At today's exchange rate, that amounts to US$14.9 million, still making it one of the highest-grossing imported films in the country. It was shown tax free in Bombay (known as Mumbai since 1995) and Delhi.

The film grossed a total of $127.8 million worldwide. Goldcrest Films invested £5,076,000 in the film and received £11,461,000 in return, earning them a profit of £6,385,000.

The film was successful on home video, with over 50,000 copies sold in the United States in 1983 at a US$79.95 (equivalent to $300 in 2025) retail price.

=== Accolades ===
Award	Category	Nominee(s)	Result	Ref.
Academy Awards	Best Picture	Richard Attenborough	Won	
Academy Awards	Best Director	Richard Attenborough	Won	
Academy Awards	Best Actor	Ben Kingsley	Won	
Academy Awards	Best Screenplay – Written Directly for the Screen	John Briley	Won	
Academy Awards	Best Art Direction	Art Direction: Stuart Craig and Robert W. Laing; Set Decoration: Michael Seirton	Won	
Academy Awards	Best Cinematography	Billy Williams and Ronnie Taylor	Won	
Academy Awards	Best Costume Design	John Mollo and Bhanu Athaiya	Won	
Academy Awards	Best Film Editing	John Bloom	Won	
Academy Awards	Best Makeup	Tom Smith	Nominated	
Academy Awards	Best Original Score	Ravi Shankar and George Fenton	Nominated	
Academy Awards	Best Sound	Gerry Humphreys, Robin O'Donoghue, Jonathan Bates, and Simon Kaye	Nominated	
American Cinema Editors Awards	Best Edited Feature Film	John Bloom	Won	
British Academy Film Awards	Best Film	Richard Attenborough	Won	
British Academy Film Awards	Best Direction	Richard Attenborough	Won	
British Academy Film Awards	Best Actor in a Leading Role	Ben Kingsley	Won	
British Academy Film Awards	Best Actor in a Supporting Role	Edward Fox	Nominated	
British Academy Film Awards	Best Actor in a Supporting Role	Roshan Seth	Nominated	
British Academy Film Awards	Best Actress in a Supporting Role	Candice Bergen	Nominated	
British Academy Film Awards	Best Actress in a Supporting Role	Rohini Hattangadi	Won	
British Academy Film Awards	Best Screenplay	John Briley	Nominated	
British Academy Film Awards	Best Cinematography	Billy Williams and Ronnie Taylor	Nominated	
British Academy Film Awards	Best Costume Design	John Mollo and Bhanu Athaiya	Nominated	
British Academy Film Awards	Best Film Editing	John Bloom	Nominated	
British Academy Film Awards	Best Make-Up Artist	Tom Smith	Nominated	
British Academy Film Awards	Best Production Design	Stuart Craig	Nominated	
British Academy Film Awards	Best Score for a Film	Ravi Shankar and George Fenton	Nominated	
British Academy Film Awards	Best Sound	Gerry Humphreys, Robin O'Donoghue, Jonathan Bates, and Simon Kaye	Nominated	
British Academy Film Awards	Most Promising Newcomer to Leading Film Roles	Ben Kingsley	Won	
British Society of Cinematographers Awards	Best Cinematography in a Theatrical Feature Film	Billy Williams and Ronnie Taylor	Won	
David di Donatello Awards	Best Foreign Film	Richard Attenborough	Won	
David di Donatello Awards	Best Foreign Producer	Richard Attenborough	Won	
David di Donatello Awards	Best Foreign Screenplay	John Briley	Nominated	
David di Donatello Awards	European David Award	Richard Attenborough	Won	
Directors Guild of America Awards	Outstanding Directorial Achievement in Motion Pictures	Richard Attenborough	Won	
Evening Standard British Film Awards	Best Actor	Ben Kingsley	Won	
Golden Globe Awards	Best Foreign Film		Won	
Golden Globe Awards	Best Actor in a Motion Picture – Drama	Ben Kingsley	Won	
Golden Globe Awards	Best Director – Motion Picture	Richard Attenborough	Won	
Golden Globe Awards	Best Screenplay – Motion Picture	John Briley	Won	
Golden Globe Awards	New Star of the Year – Actor	Ben Kingsley	Won	
Grammy Awards	Best Album of Original Score Written for a Motion Picture or Television Special	Ravi Shankar and George Fenton	Nominated	
Japan Academy Film Prize	Outstanding Foreign Language Film		Nominated	
Kansas City Film Critics Circle Awards	Best Actor	Ben Kingsley	Won	
London Film Critics' Circle Awards	Actor of the Year	Ben Kingsley	Won	
Los Angeles Film Critics Association Awards	Best Film		2nd Place	
Los Angeles Film Critics Association Awards	Best Director	Richard Attenborough	2nd Place	
Los Angeles Film Critics Association Awards	Best Actor	Ben Kingsley	Won	
National Board of Review Awards	Best Film		Won	
National Board of Review Awards	Top Ten Films		Won	
National Board of Review Awards	Best Actor	Ben Kingsley	Won	
National Society of Film Critics Awards	Best Actor	Ben Kingsley	2nd Place	
New York Film Critics Circle Awards	Best Film		Won	
New York Film Critics Circle Awards	Best Actor	Ben Kingsley	Won	

American Film Institute

- AFI's 100 years... 100 Cheers – number 29
- AFI's 100 Years... 100 Heroes & Villains
  - Mahatma Gandhi – number 21 Hero

== See also ==
- BFI Top 100 British films
- List of 1980s films based on actual events
- List of artistic depictions of Mahatma Gandhi
- List of Indian Academy Award winners and nominees
- List of historical films set in Asia
