= Gangadharrao Deshpande =

Indian activist and independence movement leader (1871–1960)

- Born: 31 March 1871; Hudli, Belgaum
- Died: 30 July 1960 (aged 89)
- Other names: Lion of Karnataka, Khadi Bhageeratha of Karnataka
- Known for: Indian Independence Movement

Gangadharrao Balkrishna Deshpande (31 March 1871 – 30 July 1960) also known as Lion of Karnataka, Khadi Bhageeratha of Karnataka, was an Indian activist who was the leader of the Indian independence movement against British colonial rule from Belgaum. He was the right-hand man of both Lokamanya Tilak and Mahatma Gandhi in succession. Deshpande considered Lokamanya Tilak as his Guru. Deshpande served as Chairman of Karnataka branch of All-India Spinners' Association, and the All India Village Industries Association for some years. Deshpande was largely responsible for the installation of Premier of Bombay, B. G. Kher.

== Early life ==
Deshpande was born on 31 March 1871 into a Kannada-speaking Deshastha Rigvedi Brahmin family in Hudli, Belgaum, Karnataka. His father Balkrishna Deshpande was a Vatandar.

== Political work ==
Deshpande's work during the Swadeshi Movement of 1905-1906 centered around the boycott of British goods, encouragement of locally produced (swadeshi, स्वदेशी) goods, promotion of national education, and opposition to the partition of Bengal.

Freedom fighters Govindrao Yalgi and Gangadhar Rao Deshpande first planned to host Ganesha festival as a public event in 1905 for the cause of uniting the people of all faiths to fight against the British. The first 'sarvajanik' (public, सार्वजनिक) Ganesha idol was installed at Govindrao Yalgi's residence. On invitation by Deshpande, Lokamanya Tilak, who initiated the celebration of Ganapati Festival, visited Belgaum for the Ganapati festival in 1906.

Deshpande invited Mohandas Gandhi to a political conference at Belgaum in 1916, so that Gandhi could meet Lokamanya Tilak.

Deshpande supported the Non-Cooperation Movement. He hosted the Belgaum Congress Session of 1924, over which Mahatma Gandhi presided. The only session chaired by Gandhi, and address covered Kadhi spinning and Non-Cooperation Movement, attended by 70,000 people. The venue of the 1924 session was named Vijayanagar (after the Vijayanagar empire). Deshpande kept accounts, the expenditure of session was ₹ 2,20,829 and five annas and six paise. A park called "Vijaynagar Veera Soudha Udyana" has been built at the same venue (the area is now named "Tilakwadi"), with a statue of Gandhi, and several photographs of 1924 session. Pampa Sarovar, later called Congress Well, which was constructed with cost of ₹ 4,370 and 3 annas, as a water source to the 1924 convention, still exists in Vijaynagar Veerasoudha Udyana. Freedom fighters Jawaharlal Nehru, Subhash Chandra Bose, Sarojini Naidu, Motilal Nehru, Saifuddin Kitchlew, Annie Besant, Shaukat Ali, and R H Kulkarni were also present on the occasion.

Deshpande started a khadi unit at Kumari ashram near Hudali, the first khadi unit in Karnataka. Deshpande went from village to village to create awareness about the khadi movement. This work was later continued by Pundalikji Katagade.

When Gandhi broke the Salt Act at Dandi and started the Salt Satyagraha Movement, Deshpande defied the law be selling contraband salt and was arrested on the same day. Gandhi visited Hudali in 1937 on the invitation of Deshpande to Gandhi Seva Sammelana (Conference), and stayed for seven days. Others leaders present in the conference were Sardar Vallabhai Patel, Sarojini Naidu, Rajendra Prasad, Abdul Gaffar Khan, Mahadev Desai, Kasturba, along with 10,000 delegates. Gangadhar Rao Deshpande, Pundalik Katagade, Ramachandra Wadavi, Annu Guruji and others helped to build huts for the function. Mahatma Gandhi spoke in Hindi and Deshpande translated his speech into Kannada. The conference also conducted 'Rashtriya Vivah' in Hudali, which witnessed the weddings of Manu Gandhi, Gandhi's granddaughter, and Nirmala Desai, sister of Mahadev Desai. Hudli also has a "Gandhi Gangadhar Rao Smaraka Bhavan", where photos of Mahatma Gandhi with other national leaders, Mahatma Gandhi at Alfred High School, Samaldas College, Salt Satyagraha, Belgaum Congress Adhiveshana (1924), Second Round Table Conference in London (1931), Gandhi's journey to Switzerland from Paris in a third class compartment (1931), Kasturba's last moments at Aga Khan Palace, Pune (1944), and Gandhi's final immersion ceremony are displayed.

All India Congress committee started Quit India Movement on 7 and 8 August 1942, in Bombay. All Congress leaders were arrested, including Deshpande on returning to Belgaum.

The Fazl-Ali Commission consulted Deshpande during the reorganization of states.

== Gangadharrao Deshpande Memorial and Museum at Belgaum ==
The Department of Kannada and Culture, Smart City, Rani Chennamma University and other organizations will be building Gangadharrao Deshpande Memorial and Museum at Ramathertha City Park in Belgaum, for which The Belgaum Urban Development Authority has sanctioned 1,500 square meters (15 guntas) of land.
