= G. B. Singh =

- Occupations: Historian; biographer; columnist; periodontist
- Writing career
- Genres: History, Political Science
- Notable works: Gandhi Behind the Mask of Divinity, Gandhi Under Cross Examination
- Literary movement: Realism

G. B. Singh is the author of Gandhi Behind the Mask of Divinity, a biography of Mahatma Gandhi and Gandhi Under Cross Examination.

== Career ==
Singh, shortly after immigrating from India, applied to serve in the U.S. Army in 1979. Although there had been Sikhs who had enlisted in the U.S. Military previously, Singh was the first to go the officer route with his turban and beard intact. A periodontist, Singh served in the U.S. Army as a colonel, one of a small number of Sikhs allowed to retain articles of faith, grandfathered in after a change in policy in 1984 forbidding soldiers from exhibiting their religion with "conspicuous" clothing or style of hair or beard. He is the highest-ranking Sikh to have served active duty with a turban in the U.S. Army, alongside Colonel Sekhon who served in the U.S. Army Reserves.

Although Singh retired from the U.S. Army in 2007, he is still actively involved in supporting rights for future Sikhs to keep their articles of faith in the military.

In an interview Singh said that he became interested in studying Hinduism while a student of political science at the University of Oklahoma. In 1983, while watching the film Gandhi and after reading an article "The Gandhi Nobody Knows" by Richard Grenier, he began his investigation into Gandhi's life, which led to the book Gandhi Behind the Mask of Divinity.

== Selected writings ==
- Gandhi Behind the Mask of Divinity
- Gandhi Under Cross Examination

== Personal life ==
Singh has two daughters and a son. His family currently resides in Colorado. One of his daughters, Serene Singh, is a Rhodes Scholar at the University of Oxford, the founder of the National Sikh Youth Program, and former Miss Teen Colorado. In 2020, his other daughter, Naureen Singh, joined the United States Air Force, making headlines as one of the first second-generation of Sikh-Americans to join the United States Armed Forces.
