= Mirabehn =

English activist of the Indian independence movement (1892–1982)

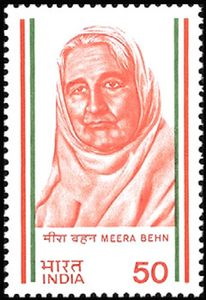
- Mirabehn on a 1983 stamp of India
- Born: Madeleine Slade; 22 November 1892
- Died: 20 July 1982 (aged 89); Vienna, Austria

Madeleine Slade (22 November 1892 – 20 July 1982), also known as Mirabehn or Meera Behn, was a British supporter of the Indian Independence Movement who in the 1920s left her home in England to live and work with Mahatma Gandhi. She devoted her life to human development and the advancement of Gandhi's principles.

== Early life ==
Madeleine Slade was born on 22 November 1892 to a well connected British family. Her father, Rear-Admiral Sir Edmond Slade was in her early years an officer in the Royal Navy who served as the Commander-in-Chief of the East Indies Squadron, and later became director of the Naval Intelligence Division of the Admiralty War Staff. Her mother Florence Madeleine, née Saunders, was the eldest daughter of James Carr Saunders of Milton Heath, Dorking, but was born in Reigate, Surrey in 1870). Sir Edmond and his wife also had another daughter, Madeline's sister Rhona.

Madeleine spent much of her childhood with her mother's family, who owned a large country estate. Her maternal grandfather was from an early age a nature and animal lover, having developed a particular love for horses, and for riding them.

At the age of 15, Madeleine developed a passion for Ludwig van Beethoven's music. She took to the piano and concerts and went on to become a concert manager. In 1921, she arranged for a German conductor to lead the London Orchestra in concerts featuring Beethoven, and helped bring about an end to the British boycott of German musicians that followed the First World War.

She also visited Vienna and Germany to see where Beethoven had lived and composed his music and she read about him extensively. She read Romain Rolland's books on Beethoven and later met with him at Villeneuve, where he was living at the time. During this meeting, Rolland mentioned a new book of his called Mahatma Gandhi, which she had not read. Rolland described Gandhi as another Christ and as the greatest figure of the 20th century. On her return to England, she read Rolland's biography of Gandhi, which convinced her to become a disciple of the Mahatma. She later recalled of the book, "I could not put it down... From that moment I knew that my life was dedicated to Gandhi." Rather than embarking for India right away, Madeleine decided to prepare herself for the change by studying material on the Sabarmarti Ashram, sitting cross-legged, and adopting a vegetarian diet. In 1924, she wrote to Gandhi expressing her wish to join him, and also sending him 20 pounds. Gandhi replied, pleased with her patience and willingness to prepare herself first, and asked that she decide on whether or not to come in a year's time. She then continued training herself for all the demands of an ascetic's life in India, giving up all wine, beer, and spirits, and learning to spin and weave wool. That year in England, she subscribed to Young India and spent a part of her time in Paris reading the Bhagvad Gita and part of the Rigveda in French.

== Arrival in India, change of name, and role in the independence movement ==
In November 1925, she contacted Gandhi and requested to stay in his ashram. She arrived in Bombay on 6 November 1925, and was met by followers of Gandhi as well as his son, Devdas. Declining to spend the day sightseeing, she set off to Ahmedabad, where she was received by Mahadev Desai, Vallabhbhai Patel, and Swami Anand on 7 November 1925. This was the beginning of her stay in India that lasted almost 34 years. Upon meeting her, Gandhi said "You will be my daughter", and gave her the name Mirabehn, which represents the Hindu mystic Mirabai. Speaking about her name Mirabehn, she stated in the spring of 1982, ''It is my name. If someone says 'Miss Slade' to me, I don't know who they are talking to.''

Mirabehn attended her first annual meeting of the Indian National Congress in December 1925. She spent most of 1926 in Sabarmati, where she spun and wove, cooked, and cleaned in the ashram. In December of that year, she travelled to Delhi, where she stayed at a women's hostel. After about a year into her stay in India, Mirabehn continued to struggle with the languages in North India such as Hindi and Gujarati, so Gandhi sent her to Gurukul Kanya and Gurukul Kangri to learn the languages. Mirabehn had hopes that Gandhi would take her with him after the Jubilee Celebration at Gurukul Kangri, but to her dismay he sent her to Bhagwadbhakti Ashram of Rewari for a better learning experience. She spent the early months of 1927 visiting ashrams across North India. During this time, she also worked on correcting the language and grammar of the English version of Gandhi's autobiography, a special task given to her by Gandhi himself. After returning to Sabarmati, she decided to become a celibate, began wearing a white sari, and cut her hair short. In September 1928, Gandhi asked her to travel through North, South, and East India alone with the hope of her gaining experience to start a training center for spinning and weaving in Sabarmati. In 1929, she visited Santiniketan, a university founded by Rabindranath Tagore, where she met Tagore himself.

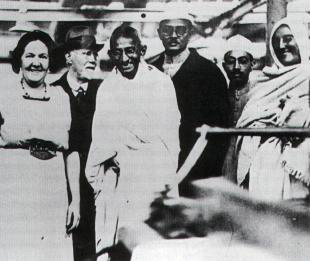
Mira Behn (far right) with Mahatma Gandhi at the Greenfield Mill, at Darwen, Lancashire

Mirabehn's stay in India coincided with the zenith of the Gandhian phase of the Indian independence movement. She accompanied Gandhi to the Round Table Conference in London in 1931. On their way back to India from London, Mirabehn and Gandhi visited Romain Rolland, who gave her a book on Beethoven which he had written while she was in India. As she began to read it, it convinced her to move to Austria and spend her remaining days in the land of Beethoven's music - a dream she would fulfill thirty years later.

Upon returning to Bombay from the conference, Gandhi was arrested on orders of the new viceroy, Lord Willingdon. Mirabehn then took on the task of preparing weekly reports of who had been arrested, where, and why. This soon led to her arrest, and she was jailed at Arthur Road Jail for three months, where she met Sarojini Naidu and Kamaladevi Chattopadhyay. Shortly after being released, she was arrested once again in 1932 for entering Bombay without permission, this time being jailed for a longer term. She was transferred to Sabarmati Jail in Ahmedabad, where she shared a cell with Kasturba, Gandhi's wife.

In the summer of 1934, she asked Gandhi for permission to tour the West to promote the Indian independence movement. She spoke in London, Wales, Lancashire, and Newcastle, among other locations. The tour included a meeting with former British Prime Minister David Lloyd George, and a correspondence and eventual meeting with future Prime Minister Winston Churchill. Throughout the tour, she argued that Indians were more than capable of self-government and spoke at length on the negative effects of British colonial policy on India's rural industries and the high taxes imposed on Indian taxpayers. She then travelled to the United States through her contact with Priest John Haynes Holmes, and in her two-week tour she spoke to 22 gatherings, spoke on five radio broadcasts, and met First Lady Eleanor Roosevelt. Mirabehn also took an active interest in the establishment of the Sevagram Ashram, and worked among the people of Orissa to non-violently resist a potential Japanese invasion in the beginning of 1942.

In August 1942, Mirabehn was arrested along with Gandhi and many Congress leaders as they launched the 'Quit India' movement. They were jailed in Aga Khan Palace in Poona (Pune) until May 1944. Both Mahadev Desai and Kasturba Gandhi died while jailed at the palace. After her release from jail, with Gandhi's permission, she established the Kisan Ashram on a plot of land near Haridwar. Here, the locals constructed a home and a cattle shed. Soon the ashram was home to cows and bullocks, a shed for khadi, and a dispensary for basic medicine. She then moved to Pashulok in 1946, at the request of Govind Ballabh Pant, who wanted to involve her in agriculture extension programs. Despite living in an ashram, she maintained correspondence with Gandhi through 1947, and spent three months with him in Delhi after she fell ill towards the end of the year. Throughout her life, she was a witness to the Simla Conference, Cabinet Mission, Interim Government, Constituent Assembly, Partition of India, and assassination of Mahatma Gandhi.

== Post-independence life in India ==
After Independence, she established a settlement named Bapu Gram in Rishikesh and the Gopal Ashram in Bhilangna Valley in 1952. She took to dairying and farming experiments in these ashrams and also spent a while in Kashmir. During the time she spent in Kumaon and Garhwal she observed the destruction of the forests there and the impact it was having on floods in the plains. She wrote about it in an essay titled Something Wrong in the Himalaya but her advice was ignored by the Forest Department. In the 1980s, these areas witnessed a large Gandhian environmental campaign to save the forests called the Chipko Movement.

== Austrian years ==
She returned to England in 1959, and relocated to Austria in 1960. Her long-time friend, India's Prime Minister Indira Gandhi, whom Mirabehn had known since Gandhi was a child, made sure she was taken care of even while in Austria. Prime Minister Gandhi had instructed the Indian Embassy in Austria to provide Mirabehn with whatever she needed. Throughout her years in Austria, four of her friends visited her daily. Nonetheless, she continued to voluntarily live a simple life, eating only natural foods and abstaining from using labor saving devices. She spent 22 years in small villages in the Vienna Woods (Baden, Hinterbrühl, Kracking), where she died in 1982.

She was awarded India's second highest civilian honour, the Padma Vibhushan, in 1981.

== Books by Mirabehn ==
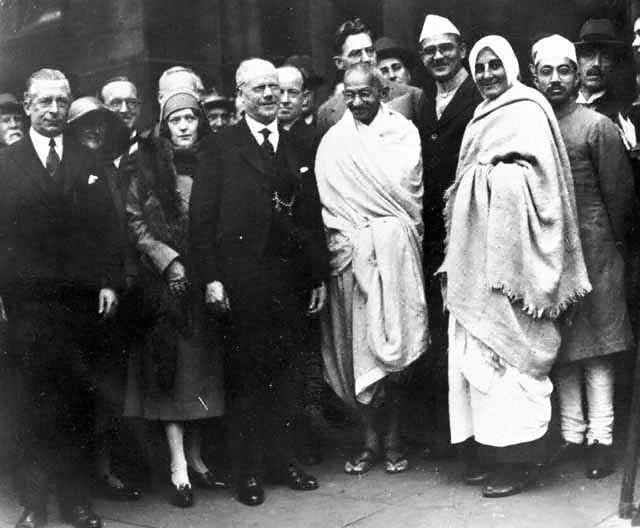
Mirabehn with Gandhi at Darwen, Sharko, 1931

Mirabehn's autobiography is titled The Spirit's Pilgrimage. She also published Bapu's Letters to Mira and New and Old Gleanings. Mirabehn drafted a book called Beethoven’s Mystical Vision (not “The Spirit of Beethoven”). It was published in Madurai by Khadi Friends Forum in 1999, and then a second, digital edition in 2000 by MGM University.

== In popular culture ==
- Actress Geraldine James portrayed her in Richard Attenborough's film, Gandhi, which premiered several months after Mirabehn's death in 1982.
- In Mira and the Mahatma, Sudhir Kakar provides a fictional account of Mirabehn's relationship with Gandhi as his disciple.
- In his book, Rebels Against the Raj, Ramchandra Guha tells the story of how Mirabehn and six other foreigners served India in its quest for independence from the British Raj.

== Bibliography ==
- Spirits Pilgrimage, by Mirabehn. Great River Books. 1984. ISBN 0-915556-13-8.
- New and Old Gleanings, by Mirabehn. Navajivan Pub. House. 1964.

== See also ==
- Gandhism
- Sarla Behn
