= Madeleine Rolland =

French translator and peace activist (1872–1960)

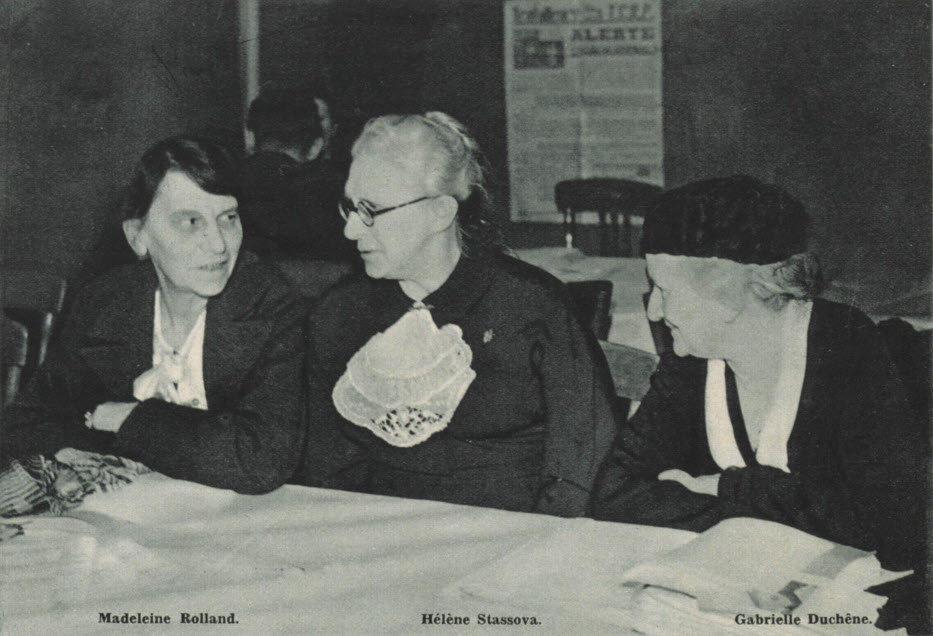
Madeleine Rolland, Elena Stasova, and Gabrielle Duchêne (l-r) in August 1934 at the world gathering of women.

Madeleine Rolland (October 17, 1872 – April 1, 1960) was a French translator and peace activist. She was affiliated with the French section of the Women's International League for Peace and Freedom (WILPF).

== Biography ==
Madeleine Rolland was born in Clamecy, October 17, 1872.

She passed the Agrégation in English in 1901, and then taught in Paris at the Guild (future Franco-British Institute).

From 1919, she filled the roles of secretary and interpreter for her brother, Romain Rolland. That same year, she joined the Women's International League for Peace and Freedom (WILPF).

Rolland was a translator, most notably of Tess of the d'Urbervilles by Thomas Hardy, but also À quatre voix by Rabindranath Tagore.

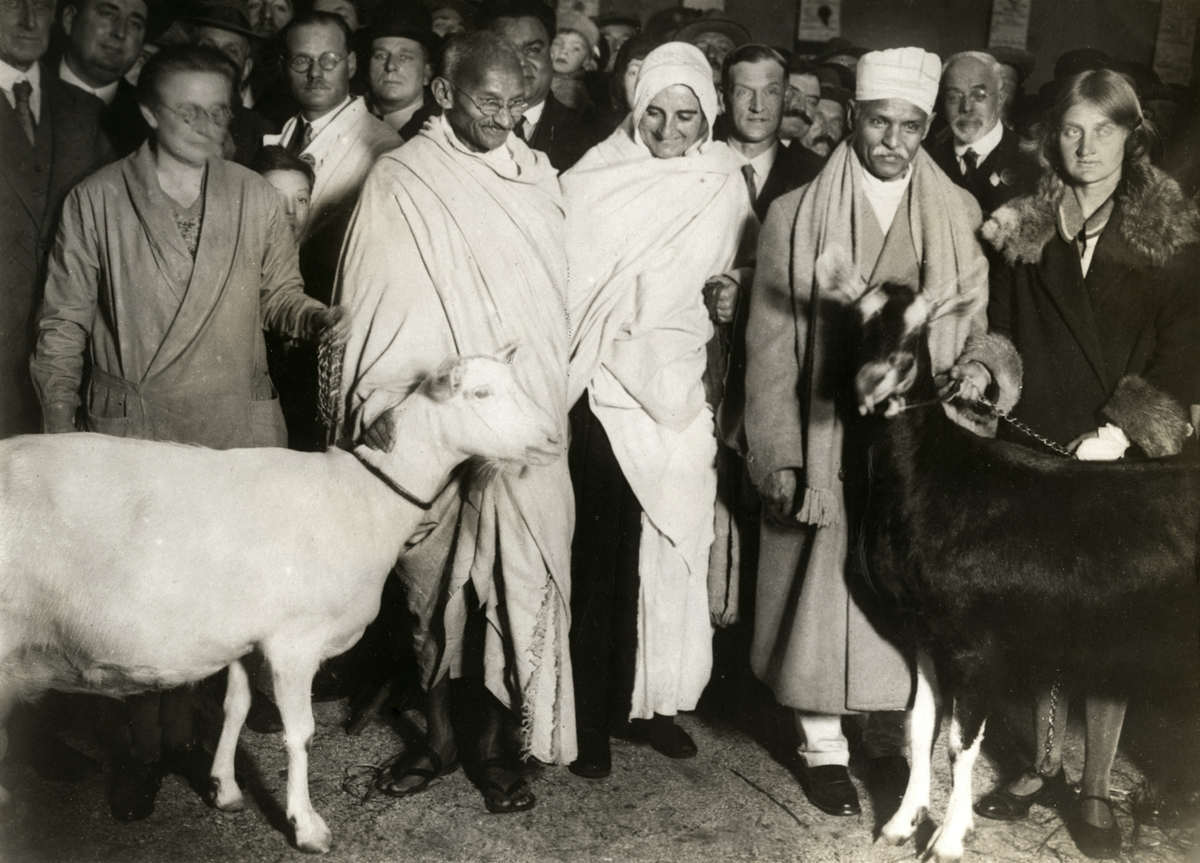
Madeleine Rolland, Mahatma Gandhi, and Mirabehn (l-r), 1931

Rolland's language skills made it possible for her brother, Romain, to correspond with Rabindranath Tagore and Mahatma Gandhi. She was also a regular correspondent with Madeleine Slade.

She spent the Occupation in Dijon, with Yvonne Paquet. At the Liberation, the two women led a section of the Union des femmes françaises (renamed, Femmes solidaires).

Madeleine Rolland died in Créteil, April 1, 1960.

== See also ==
- List of peace activists

== Bibliography ==
- Dadoun, Roger (2012). "La Fabrique des grands hommes". Segni e Comprensione (in French) (77): 47–61.
- Lacoste, Jean; Prévost, Marie-Laure (2013). Bartillat, DL (ed.). "Romain Rolland". Journal de Vézelay: 1938-1944 (in French). Paris. ISBN 978-2841005161.
- Vieillard, Roger (2012). "Madeleine Rolland et Yvonne Paquet". Cahiers de Brèves (in French). 15: 18–19.
