= Gandhi: Behind the Mask of Divinity =

2004 book by Colonel G. B. Singh

- Cover page
- Author: G. B. Singh
- Language: English
- Genre: Nonfiction
- Publisher: Prometheus Books
- Publication date: April 2004
- Publication place: United States
- Media type: Print (hardcover and Paperback)
- Pages: 356
- ISBN: 978-1-57392-998-1
- Followed by: Gandhi Under Cross Examination

Gandhi: Behind the Mask of Divinity is a biographical book about Mahatma Gandhi by United States Army officer G. B. Singh. It claims to challenge his image as a saintly, benevolent, and pacifistic leader of Indian independence, told through Gandhi's own writings and actions over the course of his life. The book claims that Gandhi emulated racism from the Hindu caste system, towards the blacks of South Africa and the untouchables, instigated ethnic hatred against foreign communities, and, to this end, was involved in covering up the killing of American engineer William Francis Doherty. Singh puts forward that the portrayal of Gandhi as a great leader is "the work of the Hindu propaganda machine" and Christian clergy with ulterior motives; and, furthermore, it was based on irrationality and deception which historians have failed to critically examine.

== Reception ==
Professor Manfred Steger, author of Gandhi's Dilemma: Nonviolent Principles And Nationalist Power, wrote a review of the book in the December 2005 issue of The Historian. He stated that the author doesn't offer hard evidence for the first thesis in the book, the alleged "Hindu propaganda machine", and found Singh's "eagerness to accuse" without raising or answering relevant questions "deeply disturbing". At the same time, Steger said that the author offers "much better evidence" for the second thesis, Gandhi's racist attitude. He stated, "Perhaps one of the strongest sections of the book is the author's examination of pertinent primary and secondary literature revealing Gandhi's attitude toward black Africans during his two decades in South Africa". Steger noted that numerous other "balanced" critiques of Gandhi exist, such as the works by Ved Mehta, Partha Chatterjee, and Joseph Alter. In comparison, Steger concluded, that the book was a "one-sided attack" on Gandhi, without offering the larger, more complex picture of Gandhi's ethical and political engagements, thus turning it into a "strident polemic".

Thomas W. Clark, reviewing the book for The Humanist, stated that most readers will find the book "overwrought and unnecessarily inflammatory". As for Singh's accusations of Gandhi destroying incriminating documents to cover up his racist views, Clark labeled them "unsubstantiated hypothesis" and "simply speculation". Clark instead recommended B. R. Ambedkar's What Gandhi and the Congress Have Done to the Untouchables (1945) as a "more substantial and balanced account of some of Gandhi's shortcomings".

R. J. Terchek in his review for Choice wrote that the "book lacks balance and refuses to acknowledge that people can grow and develop, learn from mistakes, and try to move forward."

In his book, Gandhi's Philosophy and the Quest for Harmony, the author Anthony Parel termed Singh's book as "scurrilous", "crude bias", and "deplorable ignorance".

A bibliography on Gandhi-related literature by Ananda M. Pandiri described it as a highly critical account which interpreted his every move as racist and which was based on questionable arguments.

Katie Violin of The Kansas City Star also criticized the book and stated that "Gandhi as a racist doesn't add up." Adding that "Establishing the book's incendiary premise becomes the Achilles heel of G.B. Singh's Gandhi: Behind the Mask of Divinity. ... Singh's failure to first define racism and second to demonstrate how Gandhi's behavior with regard to other races was socially aberrant in his lifetime weakens the author's argument irreparably. It is rather difficult to market one's book as a scholarly work if basic definitions and sociological conditions are not even given mention."

Theres Sudeep, writing for the Deccan Herald, noted that the "book has been criticised for it's [sic] one-sided approach and sweeping statements."

== See also ==
- Gandhi Under Cross Examination, 2009 book by Singh
