= Gandhi Under Cross Examination =

2009 book by G. B. Singh and Tim Watson

- Cover page by Sovereign Star Publishing, Inc.
- Author: G. B. Singh; Timothy Watson
- Language: English
- Genre: Nonfiction
- Publisher: Sovereign Star Publishing, Inc
- Publication date: June 2009
- Publication place: United States
- Media type: Print (paperback)
- Pages: 287
- ISBN: 0-9814992-2-8
- Preceded by: Gandhi Behind the Mask of Divinity

Gandhi Under Cross Examination is a 2009 book written by G. B. Singh and Timothy Watson about Mahatma Gandhi. They critique Gandhi's image as an Indian civil rights leader by cross-examining him and his views in an imaginary courtroom.

In 1893, Gandhi went to South Africa, where, by his own account, he was thrown off a train on racial grounds. In their scrutiny of the incident and Gandhi's later statements, the authors claim that Gandhi gave divergent accounts of what happened on his journey to Pretoria. The book catalogs the incidents that happened around that time and attempts to prove that the train incident never occurred. The authors claim that Gandhi lied about the incident.

== See also ==
- Gandhi Behind the Mask of Divinity, 2004 book by Singh
