= Richard Grenier (newspaper columnist) =

American newspaper columnist (1923–2002)

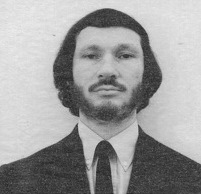
- Born: December 30, 1933; Cambridge, Massachusetts, US
- Died: January 29, 2002 (aged 68); Washington, D.C., US
- Resting place: Arlington National Cemetery
- Occupation: Newspaper columnist

Richard Grenier (December 30, 1933 – January 29, 2002) was a neoconservative cultural columnist for The Washington Times and a film critic for Commentary and The New York Times. The Forbes Media Guide Five Hundred, 1994 stated:

Grenier's maniac, often barbed style is an acquired taste, not recommended to those who prefer polite commentary. He scores against both the administration and Hollywood, two of his preferred topics. ... He takes no prisoners.

== Early life ==
Grenier was born in Cambridge, Massachusetts and raised in Brookline, Massachusetts.

Grenier graduated from the United States Naval Academy where he obtained a degree in engineering, studied at the Institut des Sciences Politiques in Paris as a Fulbright scholar, and did graduate work at Harvard. He served in the United States Navy.

== Career ==
Grenier began his career as a reporter for Agence France-Presse in Paris. He reported from Europe, North Africa, the Middle East, the Far East, and the Caribbean. While living in New York City, he worked as a broadcaster on cultural issues for PBS and later worked as a correspondent for The New York Times.

He is particularly known for his review of the film Gandhi (1982), involving scathing attacks on Gandhi and India. Grenier later expanded his review into a book, The Gandhi Nobody Knows, which Grenier dedicated to Norman Podhoretz and Midge Decter. Grenier's book was itself criticized by Jason DeParle in a successive issue of The Washington Monthly. Grenier served as a columnist at The Washington Times from 1985–1999 where he wrote about foreign affairs, national politics and culture. Grenier worked as a film critic for Commentary magazine where he wrote columns that were published by WorldNetDaily. According to Todd Gitlin, Grenier saw television as promoting "adversarial attitudes," "mindless rebellion," and "a corrosive attitude toward social responsibility."

Grenier also wrote a long article on the Oliver Stone film JFK for The Times Literary Supplement, describing it as "bludgeoning" the viewer in support of a conspiracy theory.

Grenier was also strongly antagonistic towards the United Nations, criticizing what he claimed was the "odd concentration of UN activity around the organization's two pariah states, South Africa and Israel as if they were the only trouble spots on the globe." Grenier accused the organisation of hypocrisy for granting observer status to SWAPO and the PLO but not the anti-Soviet forces in Afghanistan: "I have no idea why the Afghans struggling desperately to free their country from Soviet occupation do not qualify as a national liberation movement, but I have never heard them mentioned once in the corridors of the U.N., except by the United States".

== Organizations ==
Grenier was a member of the Council on Foreign Relations and the Harvard Club.

== Books ==
Grenier wrote two novels, Yes and Back Again (1967) and The Marrakesh One-Two (1983), and a collection of essays, Capturing the Culture: Film, Art and Politics (1991). Capturing the Culture carried an introduction by Robert H. Bork, who praised Grenier for "exposing and then skewering the Cultural Left".

The Marrakesh One-Two is a picaresque comic novel portraying the foibles of a Hollywood screenwriter who moonlights as a CIA agent while working in the Middle East. Inspired by the troubled production of The Message, a film biography of Muhammad, the book has been deemed "notable for its anti-Arabism" and "its prejudice towards Islam." The dustcover of The Marrakesh One-Two featured enthusiastic blurbs from then-Senator Daniel Patrick Moynihan and Love Story author Erich Segal. Anatole Broyard reviewed the book for The New York Times, writing that, while the novel “is superior to most comic novels and/or suspense stories,” there was “something in the author's voice - the felt presence of a real style” that “leads the reader to expect a little more than he gets.”

== Family ==
Grenier was married to Cynthia Grenier. He was the brother of Robert Grenier and Barbara Applebaum.

== Death ==
Grenier died on January 29, 2002, from a heart attack at the age of 68 at his home in Washington. As a US Navy veteran he was interred at Arlington National Cemetery.
