= Anthony Parel =

Canadian historian, author and academic (1926–2025)

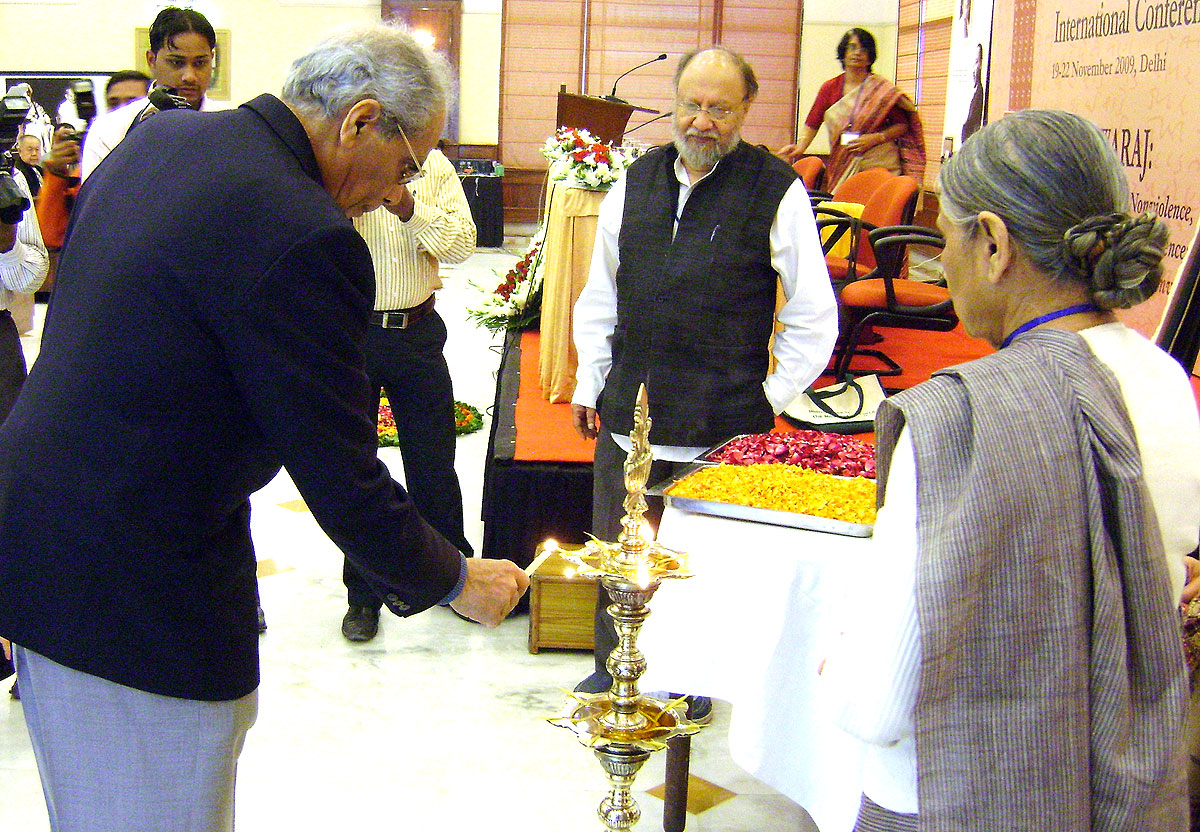
Parel lights a traditional diya at the Hind Swaraj International Centenary Conference in 2009.

Anthony Joseph Parel (July 10, 1926 – November 28, 2025) was a Canadian historian, author and academic. He authored and edited a number of books, on subjects including Thomas Aquinas, Niccolò Machiavelli, Mohandas Karamchand Gandhi and South Asian history.

More broadly, he was interested in exploring the relationship between the political, the economic, and the ethical and the spiritual.

== Life and career ==
Parel was born in present-day Kerala, India on July 10, 1926. He was educated in India and the United States and received his doctorate in government from Harvard University in 1963. Patel taught political science at the University of Calgary, Calgary, Alberta from 1966 until retirement in 1994. He later occupied the post of Professor Emeritus of Political Science at the University of Calgary.

Parel was a naturalized Canadian citizen. He died on November 28, 2025, at the age of 99.

== Partial bibliography ==
Parel's works include:

- The Machiavellian Cosmos (1982)
- Gandhi's Philosophy and the Quest for Harmony (2007)
- Gandhi: Hind Swaraj and Other Writings Centenary Edition (2009) (editor)
- The Cambridge Companion to Gandhi (2011). Co-editor with Judith M. Brown.
