= Bhilangna Valley =

Bhilangna Valley is located in the Himalayan region of India, along the Bhilangna River.

The Bhilangna valley is situated in the Tehri district of Uttarakhand state lies between 30.3743N, 78.78055E to 30.88042N, 78.89864E having an area of 1009.24km2. This area falls under bio geographic zone 2B-Northwest Himalaya (Rodgers et al. 2000). Ridges of Vasuki-taal, Sahasra-taal and Masar taal surround this valley from east and west respectively. Similarly Khatling glacier and Tharti division lies in north and south respectively. Climate The Western Himalayan climate varies according to the elevation. It gets colder as the elevation increases and gets wetter as the elevation drops. As a result, the temperature and humidity changes in the Himalayan region very quickly. All of a sudden there can be occurrences of rain, floods, high winds, snowstorms and other types of precipitation. According to the paleo-climatologists, the Miocene led to drastic changes in the vegetation and the contemporary flora has been almost entirely replaced by modern flora (Vishnu-Mittre, 1972, Singh & Singh, 1987, 1992). Extending as an arc for about 2500 km from east to west, the Himalaya covers more than 10 degree of latitudes i.e. 270-380N and exhibits an interesting pattern of rainfall from west to east (increasing gradient) and south to north (decreasing gradient). Variation in the rainfall, mean annual temperature and altitude 0are considered key factors governing vegetation types in this region. The richness of the species in the Himalayan region is generally attributed to variation in climate and habitat types (Rau, 1975, Polunin & Stainton, 1984). In general, a rise of 270m in the hills corresponds to a fall of 10C in mean temperature up to 1500m, above which temperature fall is more rapid (Mani, 1974a). In the Himalayas the rate of temperature fall is more rapid in summer than in winter. There are many variations and complexities are in climate as well as complexities of weather accentuated by the relief of land. The variations of exposure to sunlight and to rain bearing winds have the effect of producing very intricate patterns of local climate. In summer months the valleys experience hot steamy tropical climate, while at a distance of about 75 km. the great range bears the highest snowfields of the world. Valley winds in narrow valleys and heavy fog during winter in wide valleys are conspicuous features of the region. The zone of maximum precipitation during both summer and winter lies between 1,200 and 2,100m (Nautiyal, 2011).
