= Mahadev Desai =

Personal secretary of Mahatma Gandhi

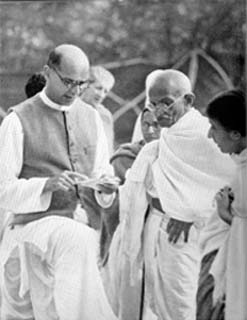
- Desai with Mahatma Gandhi
- Born: 1 January 1892; Surat, Bombay Presidency, British India (now Gujarat, India)
- Died: 15 August 1942 (aged 50); Aga Khan Palace, Poona, Bombay Presidency, British India (now Pune, Maharashtra)
- Education: Elphinstone College
- Years active: 1915–1942
- Known for: Associate activism with Mahatma Gandhi
- Spouse: Durgabehen (m. 1905–1942)

Mahadev Haribhai Desai (1 January 1892 – 15 August 1942) was an Indian independence activist, scholar and writer best remembered as Mahatma Gandhi's personal secretary. He has variously been described as "Gandhi's Boswell, a Plato to Gandhi's Socrates, as well as an Ānanda to Gandhi's Buddha".

== Early life ==
Mahadev Desai was born in an anavil Brahmin family on 1 January 1892 in the village of Saras in the Surat district of Gujarat to Haribhai Desai, a school teacher, and his wife Jamnabehn. Jamnabehn died when Desai was seven years old. In 1905, aged 13, Mahadev was married to Durgabehn. He was educated at the Surat High School and the Elphinstone College, Mumbai. Desai graduated with a BA Degree, and after earning his L.L.B in 1913 took a job as an inspector at the central co-operative bank in Bombay

== Gandhi's associate ==
Mahadev Desai first met Gandhi in 1915 when he went to meet him to seek his advice on how best to publish his book (a Gujrati translation of John Morley's English book On Compromise). Desai joined Gandhi's Ashram in 1917 and with Durgabehn accompanied him to Champaran that year. He maintained a diary from 13 November 1917 to 14 August 1942, the day before his death, chronicling his life with Gandhi. In 1919 when the colonial government arrested Gandhi in Punjab, he named Desai his heir. Desai was for the first time arrested and sentenced to a year in prison in 1921. He was Gandhi's personal secretary for 25 years, but as Verrier Elwin wrote of him, "he was much more than that. He was in fact Home and Foreign Secretary combined. He managed everything. He made all the arrangements. He was equally at home in the office, the guest-house and the kitchen. He looked after many guests and must have saved 10 years of Gandhi's life by diverting from him unwanted visitors". Rajmohan Gandhi writes of Mahadev Desai thus: "Waking up before Gandhi in pre-dawn darkness, and going to sleep long after his Master, Desai lived Gandhi's day thrice over — first in an attempt to anticipate it, next in spending it alongside Gandhi, and finally in recording it into his diary".

== Political activism ==
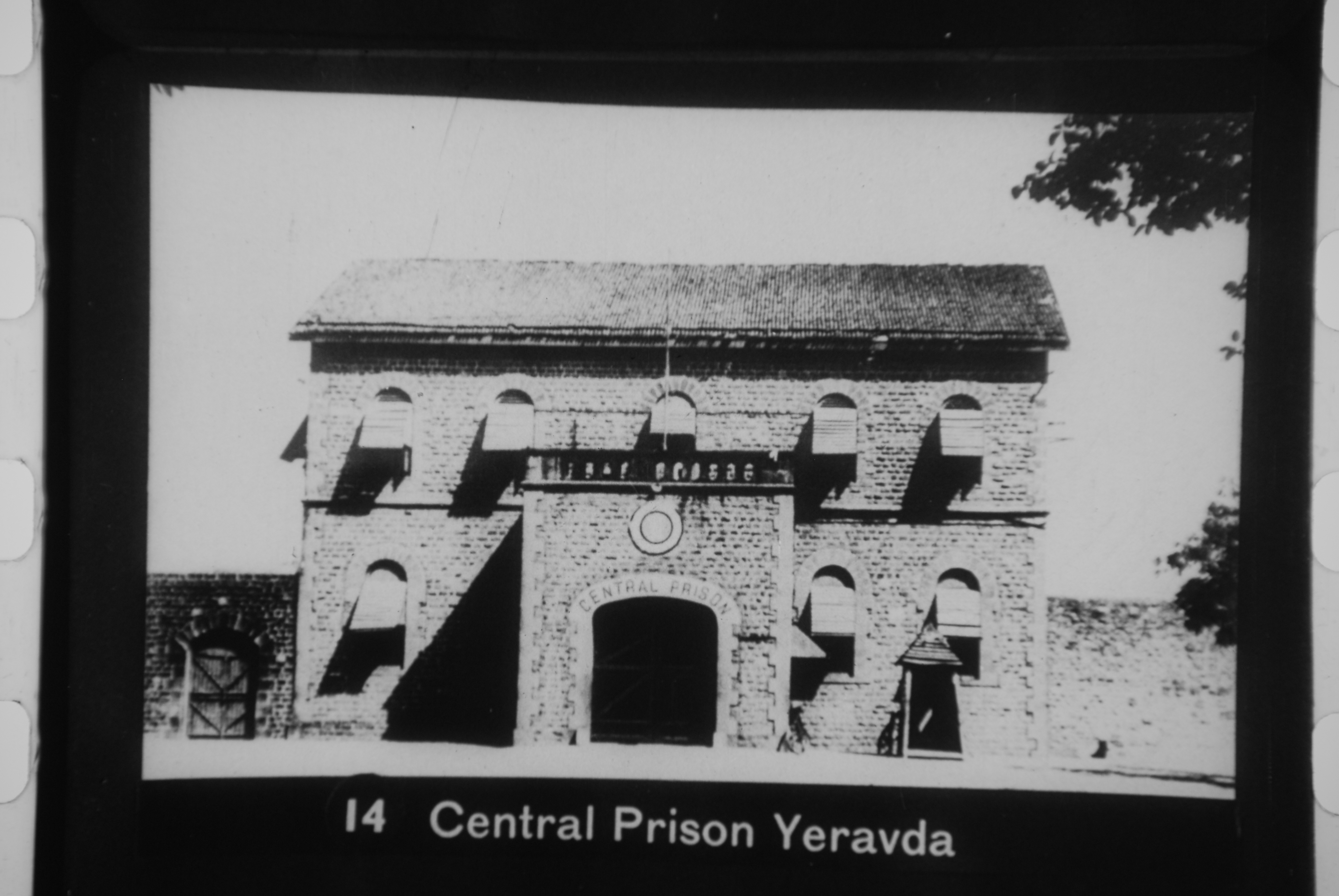
Yerawada Jail

In 1920, Motilal Nehru requisitioned the services of Mahadev Desai from Gandhi to run his newspaper, the Independent, from Allahabad. Desai created a sensation by bringing out a hand-written cyclostyled newspaper after the Independent's printing press was confiscated by the British government. Desai was sentenced to a year's rigorous imprisonment for his writings in 1921 – his first stint in prison. In prison, Desai saw that the jail authorities mistreated prisoners, frequently flogging them. His report describing life inside an Indian jail, published in Young India and Navajivan, compelled the British authorities to bring about some drastic jail reform measures. Desai took over as editor of Navajivan in 1924 and from 1925 he began the translation into English of Gandhi's autobiography and its serial publication in the Young India. The following year he became chairman of the executive committee of the Satyagraha Ashram and won a prize from the Gujarati Sahitya Parishad for his article in Navajivan. He took part in the Bardoli Satyagraha along with Sardar Patel and wrote a history of the Satyagraha in Gujarati which he translated into English as The Story of Bardoli. For his participation in the Salt Satyagraha, he was arrested and imprisoned but following the Gandhi–Irwin Pact, he was released from jail and accompanied Gandhi to the Second round Table Conference along with Mirabehn, Devdas Gandhi and Pyarelal. He was the only person to accompany Gandhi when the latter met with King George V.

Following the collapse of the Gandhi–Irwin Pact and the deadlock at the Round Table Conference, Gandhi restarted the Civil Disobedience Movement. The colonial government, under the new Viceroy, Lord Willingdon, was determined to crush the movement and ordered a clampdown on the Indian National Congress and its activists. In 1932, Desai was arrested again and sent to prison with Gandhi and Sardar Patel. Following his release in 1933, he was re-arrested and detained in the Belgaum Jail. It was during this time in prison that he wrote Gita According to Gandhi which was posthumously published in 1946. He also played a role in organising people's movements in the princely states of Rajkot and Mysore in 1939 and was put in charge of selecting satyagrahis during the Individual Satyagraha of 1940. Desai's final prison term followed the Quit India Declaration of 8 August 1942. He was arrested on the morning of 9 August 1942 and, till his death of a massive heart-attack six days later, was interred with Gandhi at the Aga Khan Palace. Desai was 50 at the time of his death.

== Writings ==
Mahadev Desai was an outstanding writer, at ease with Gujarati, Bengali and English. He is highly regarded as a translator and writer in Gujarati. He wrote several biographies such as Antyaj Sadhu Nand (1925), Sant Francis (1936), Vir Vallabhbhai (1928) and Be Khudai Khidmatgar (1936) which was a biography of Khan Abdul Gaffar Khan and his brother Khan Abdul Jabbar Khan.

He started translating when he was studying in college. He translated John Morley's On Compromise in Gujarati and won a thousand rupees prize of the Farbas Gujarati Sabha. Later it was published as Satyagrahni Maryada. From Bengali, he translated Saratchandra Chattopadhyaya's short stories as Tran Vartao (1923) and the novella Virajvahu (1924). He also translated Tagore's works into Gujarati such as Prachin Sahitya (1922), Chitrangada and Viday Abhishap (1925). He translated Nehru's Autobiography as Mari Jeevanktha (1936) into Gujarati from English. The English translation of Gandhi's autobiography, The Story of My Experiments with Truth, from its Gujarati original was also done by Desai.

Mahadevbhaini Dayari (1948–1997) is the 22 volume publication of Mahadev Desai's diaries. These, edited by Narhari Parikh (Volume I-VI) and Chandulal Bhagubhai Dalal (VII-XXII), provide a close look at Gandhi's life and are a valuable chronicle of the major events in Gandhi's life and in Indian independence movement.

He was also a regular contributor to Gandhi's publications Young India, Navjivan and the Harijanbandhu. Desai was among the founding members of the All India Newspaper Editors' Conference. He also frequently contributed to various nationalist Indian newspapers such as Free Press, The Bombay Chronicle, Hindustan Times, The Hindu and Amrita Bazar Patrika.

He wrote several works in English including Gandhiji in Indian Villages (1927), With Gandhiji in Ceylon (1928), The Story of Bardoli (1929), Unworthy of Vardha (1943), The Eclipse of Faith (1943), A Righteous Struggle (1951) and Gospel of Selfless Action or The Geeta According to Gandhi (1946, translation of Anasaktiyoga by Gandhi).

He was posthumously awarded the Sahitya Akademi Award in 1955 for Mahadevbhaini Dayari.

== Death and legacy ==
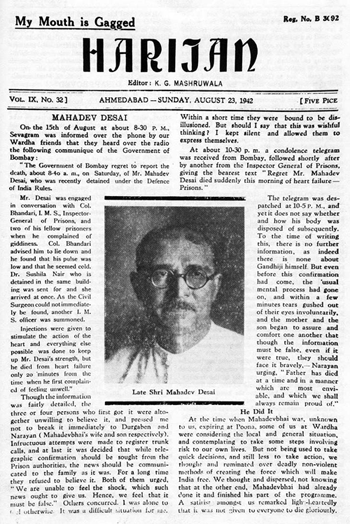
Mahadev Desai's obituary in Harijan, Gandhi's newspaper

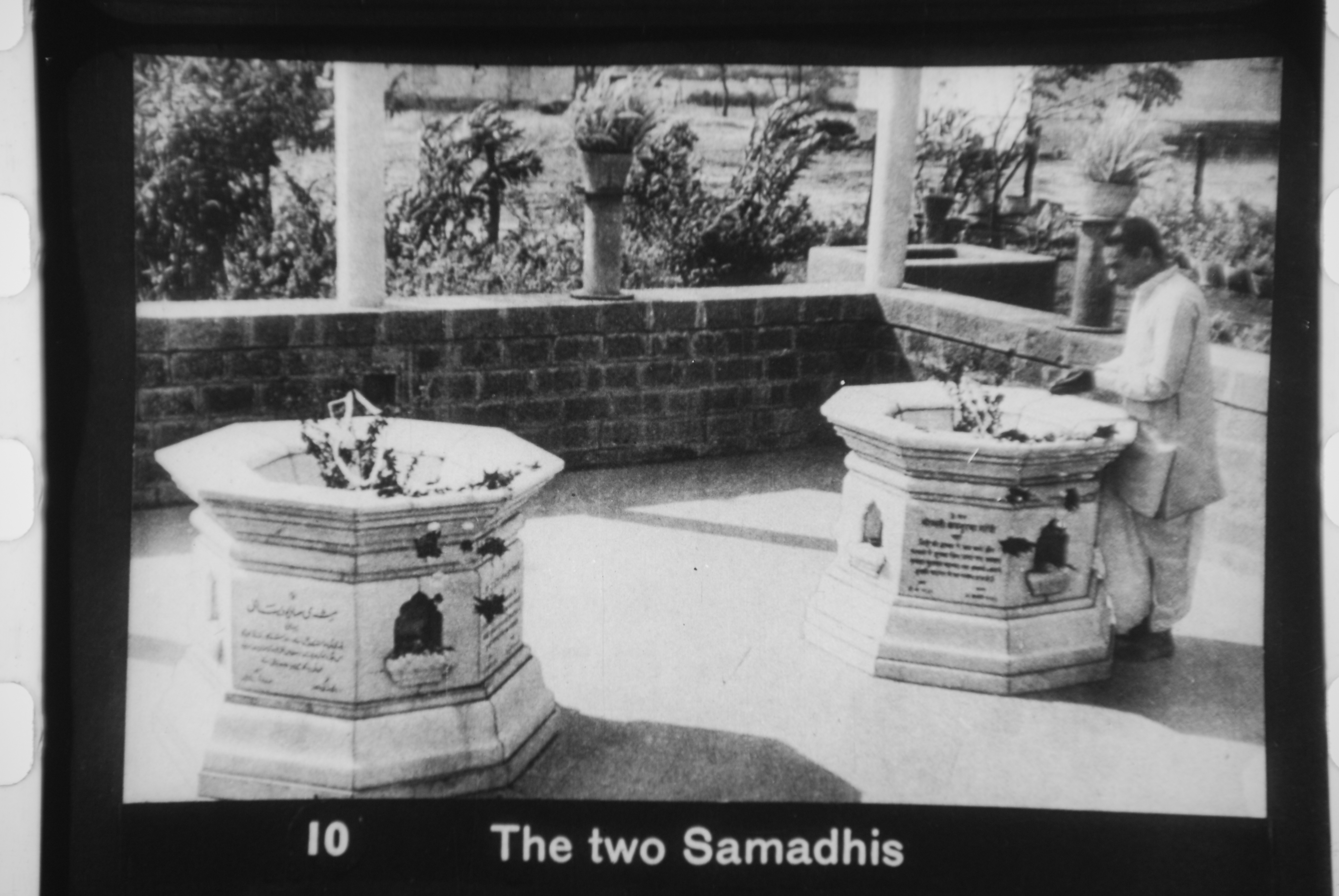
Samadhis of Kasturba Gandhi and Mahadev Desai at Aga Khan Palace, Pune

Aged 50, Mahadev Desai died of a heart attack on the morning of 15 August 1942 at the Aga Khan Palace where he was interned with Gandhi. When Desai stopped breathing, Gandhi called out to him in agitation: "Mahadev! Mahadev!" When he was later asked why he had done so, Gandhi answered: "I felt that if Mahadev opened his eyes and looked at me, I would tell him to get up. He had never disobeyed me in his life. I was confident that if had he heard those words, he would have defied even death and got up". Gandhi himself washed Desai's body and he was cremated on the Palace's grounds, where his samadhi lies today.

The Indian Department of Posts published a commemorative stamp in his honour in 1983. His son Narayan Desai was also a noted Gandhian activist and writer who wrote Mahadev Desai's biography The Fire and the Rose. The Mahadev Desai Samajseva Mahavidyalaya, Gujarat Vidyapith's faculty of social sciences, arts and humanities was named in Mahadev Desai's honour.
