= Aga Khan Palace =

Building in Pune, India, built 1892

The Aga Khan Palace
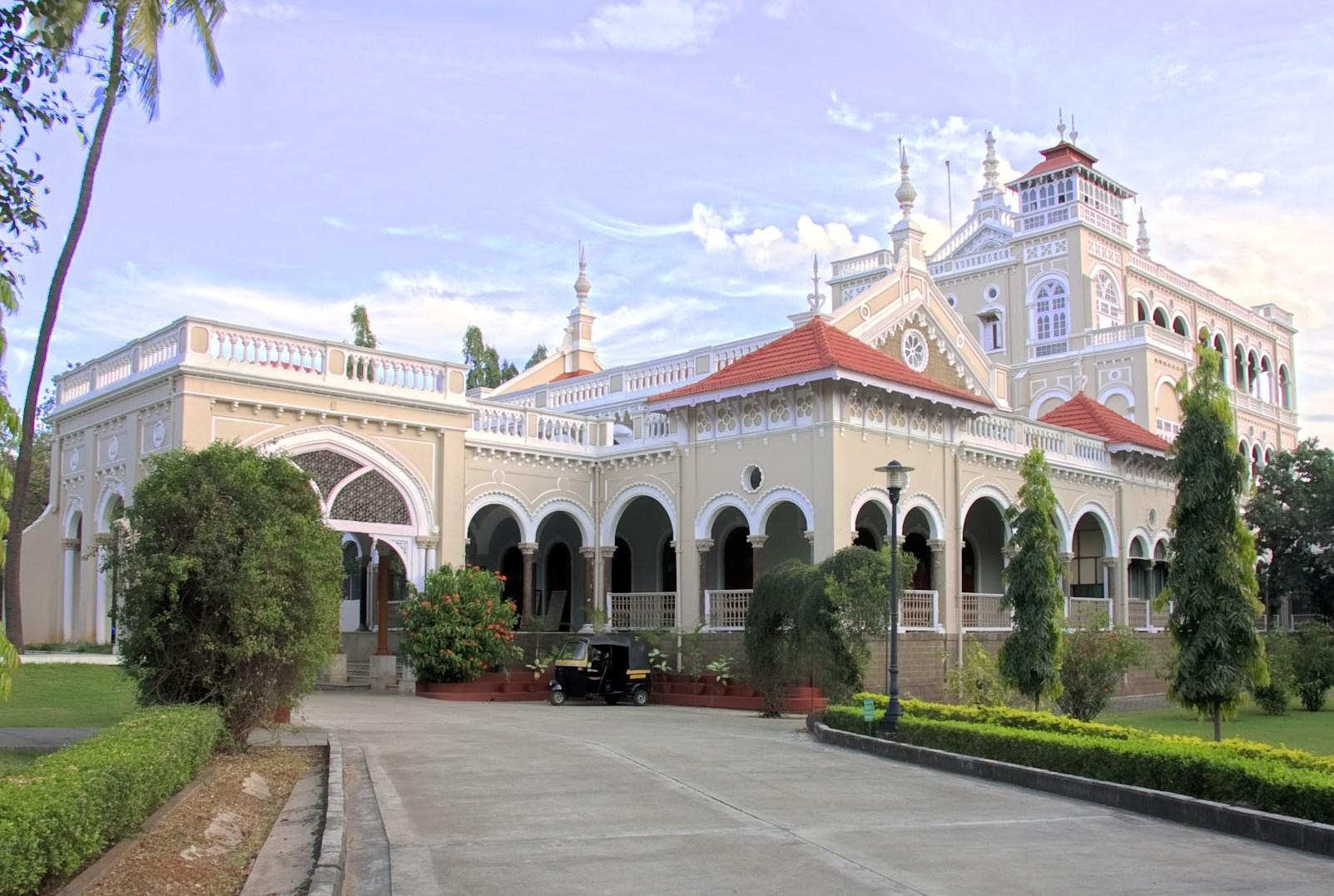

- Location of Aga Khan Palace in Maharashtra
- 18.5523°N 73.9015°E
- Location: Pune, Maharashtra, India

History
- Built: 1892; 134 years ago

Site notes
- Area: 7.7 hectares (19 acres)
- Governing body: Gandhi National Memorial Society

The Aga Khan Palace was built by Sultan Muhammed Shah Aga Khan III in the city of Pune, India.

The palace was an act of charity by the spiritual leader of the Nizari Ismaili Muslims, who wanted to help the poor residents in the neighbouring areas of Pune, after getting drastically hit by famine by offering them work. The construction took place over 5 years and involved one hundred thousand people. It cost approximately 1.2 million rupees.

The palace is closely linked to the Indian freedom movement as it served as a prison for Mahatma Gandhi, his wife Kasturba Gandhi, his secretary Mahadev Desai. Sarojini Naidu and several others were also imprisoned during the Quit India Movement that demanded an end to British rule in India. It is also the place where Kasturba Gandhi and Mahadev Desai died. In 2003, Archaeological Survey of India (ASI) declared the site as a monument of national importance. Aga Khan Palace is major attraction of photographers for various kind of photo shoot because of its special architecture, greenery and perfect for photography lighting.

== History ==
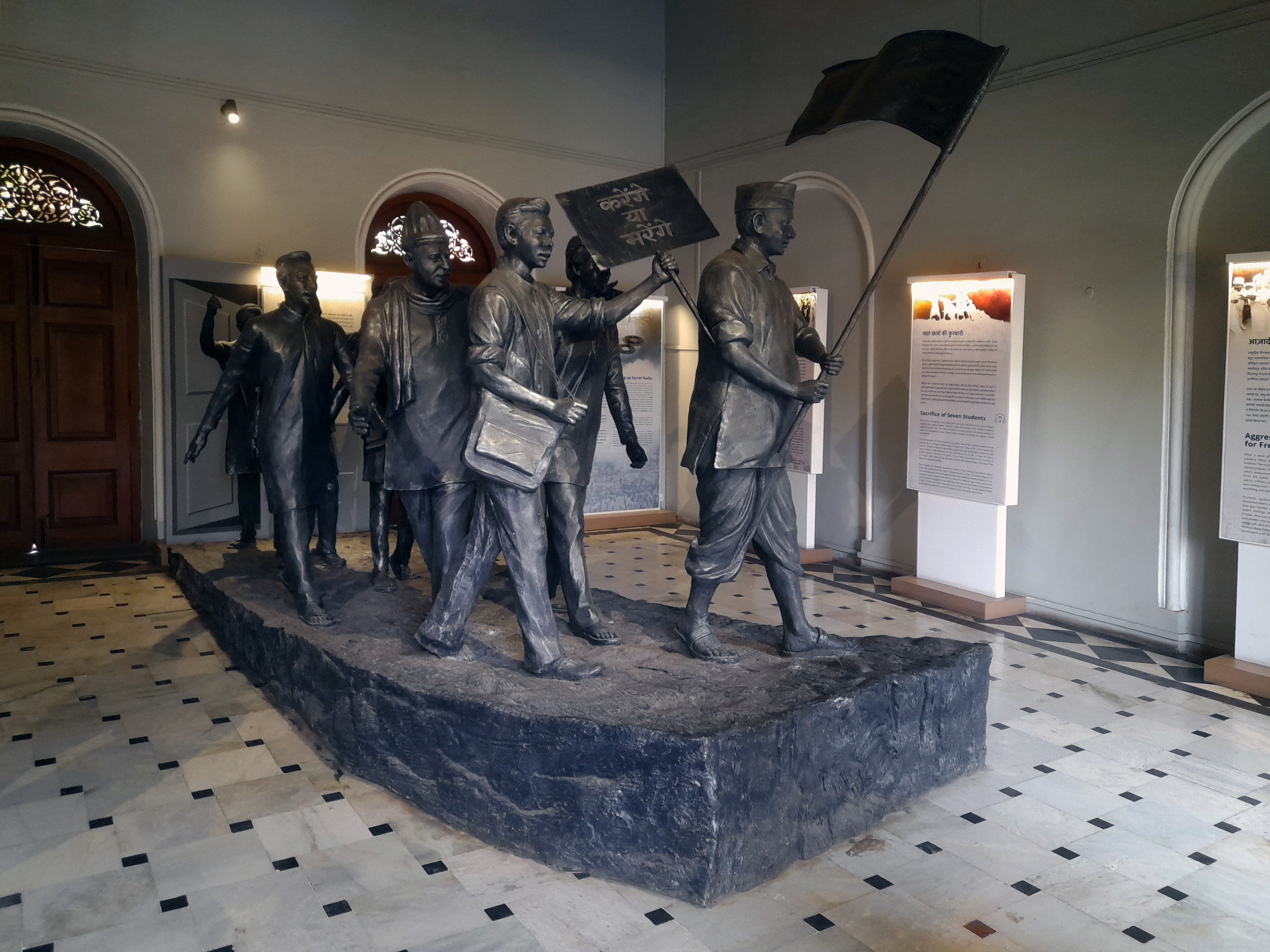
Statue depicting the Quit India Movement, Aga Khan Palace, Pune

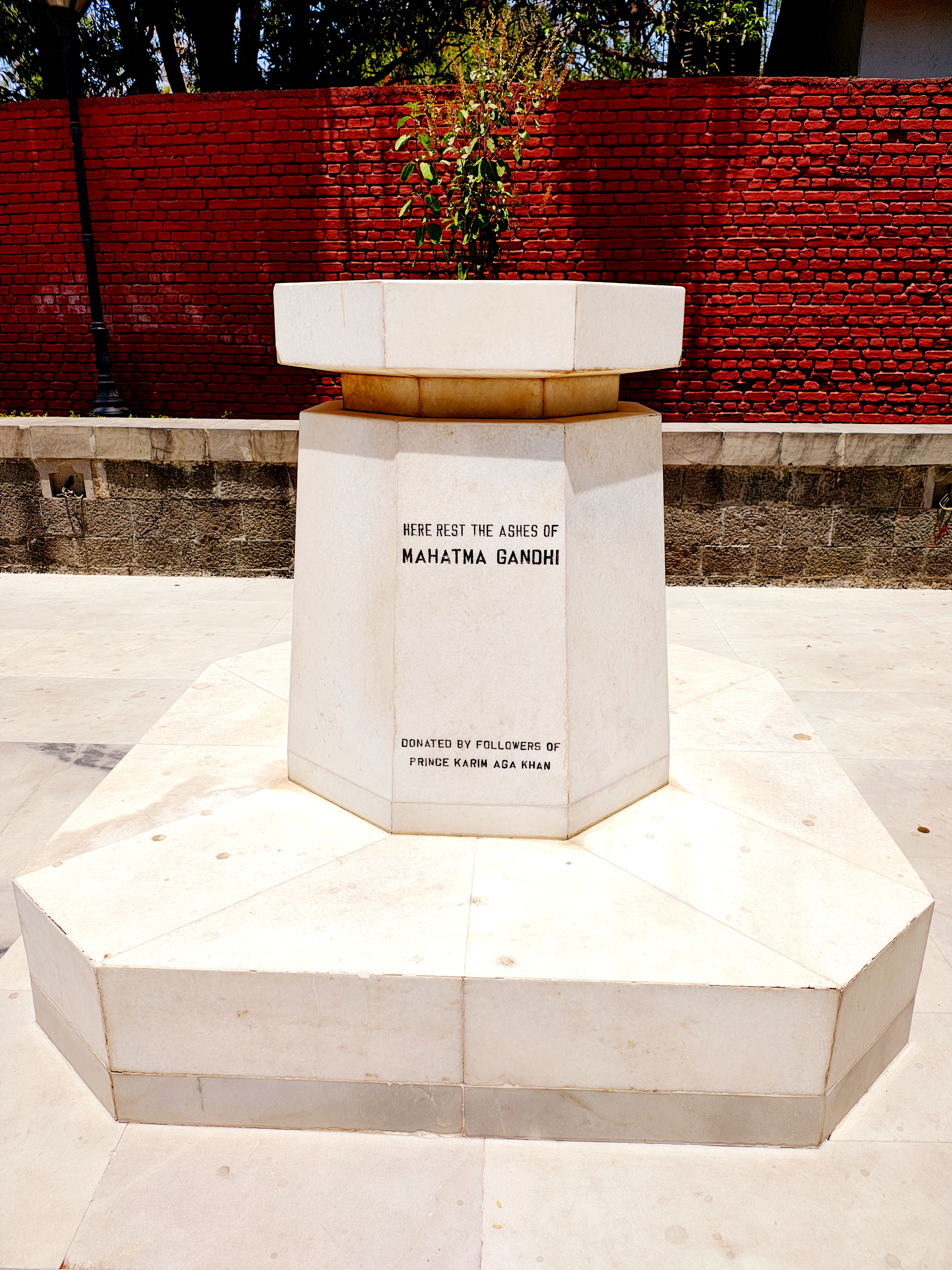
Mahatma Gandhi Ashes at Aga Khan Palace

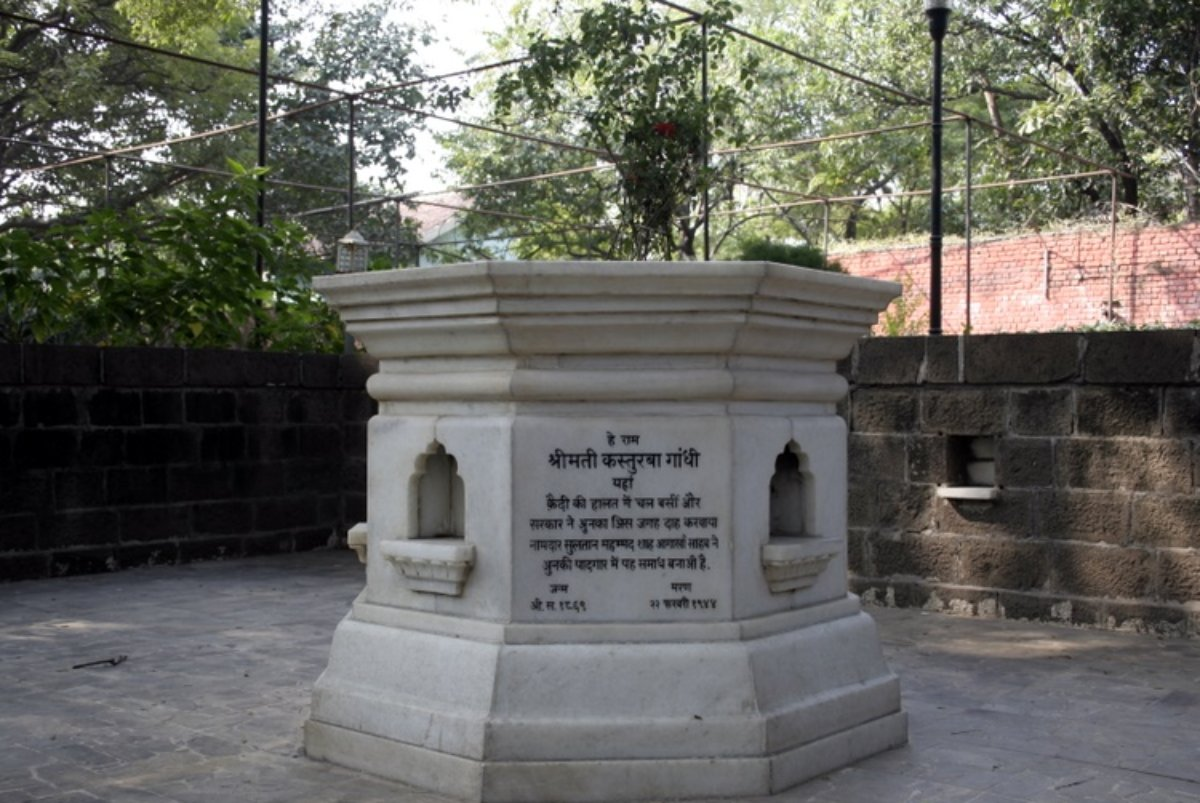
Kasturba Gandhi Samadhi

Historically, the palace holds great significance. Mahatma Gandhi, his wife Kasturba Gandhi and his secretary Mahadev Desai were interned in the palace from 9 August 1942 to 6 May 1944, following the launch of Quit India Movement. Kasturba Gandhi and Mahadev Desai died during their captivity period in the palace and have their Samadhis located over there. Mahatma Gandhi and Kasturba Gandhi have their memorials located in the same complex, near Mula river. Legend goes that the Sultan built the palace to provide employment to the famine struck villagers of the surrounding region; so he employed 1000 people, and the palace was constructed in five years. It was built in Rs 12 lakhs. The total area is 7.7 hectares (19 acres) and built up palace covers 2.8 hectares (6.9 acres), and the rest is a well maintained garden.

The palace housed a residential co-education School from 1953 - 72. In 1969, Aga Khan Palace was donated to the Indian people by Aga Khan IV as a mark of respect to Gandhi and his philosophy. Today the palace houses a memorial on Gandhi where his ashes were kept. The then prime minister Indira Gandhi had visited the place in 1974 where she allotted a sum of ₹200,000 (US$2,100) every year, for its maintenance. The amount rose to ₹1 million (US$10,000) until the 1990s, after which the national monument of India, was neglected for many years due to improper allocation of funds. There was a protest held at the statue of Mahatma Gandhi near Pune railway station in July 1999 to protest against the worsening condition of the monument. The present condition has improved quite a lot.

== Architecture ==
The Aga Khan Palace follows the Indo-Saracenic style of architecture and is complete with pediments and turrets. The area of the ground floor is 1756 m^{2}, that of the first floor is 1080 m^{2}, whereas the second floor has a construction of 445 m^{2}. The speciality of this structure is its corridor of 2.5 meters around the entire building. The palace captivates the eye of a spectator with its magnificence and picturesque architecture.

== Museum ==
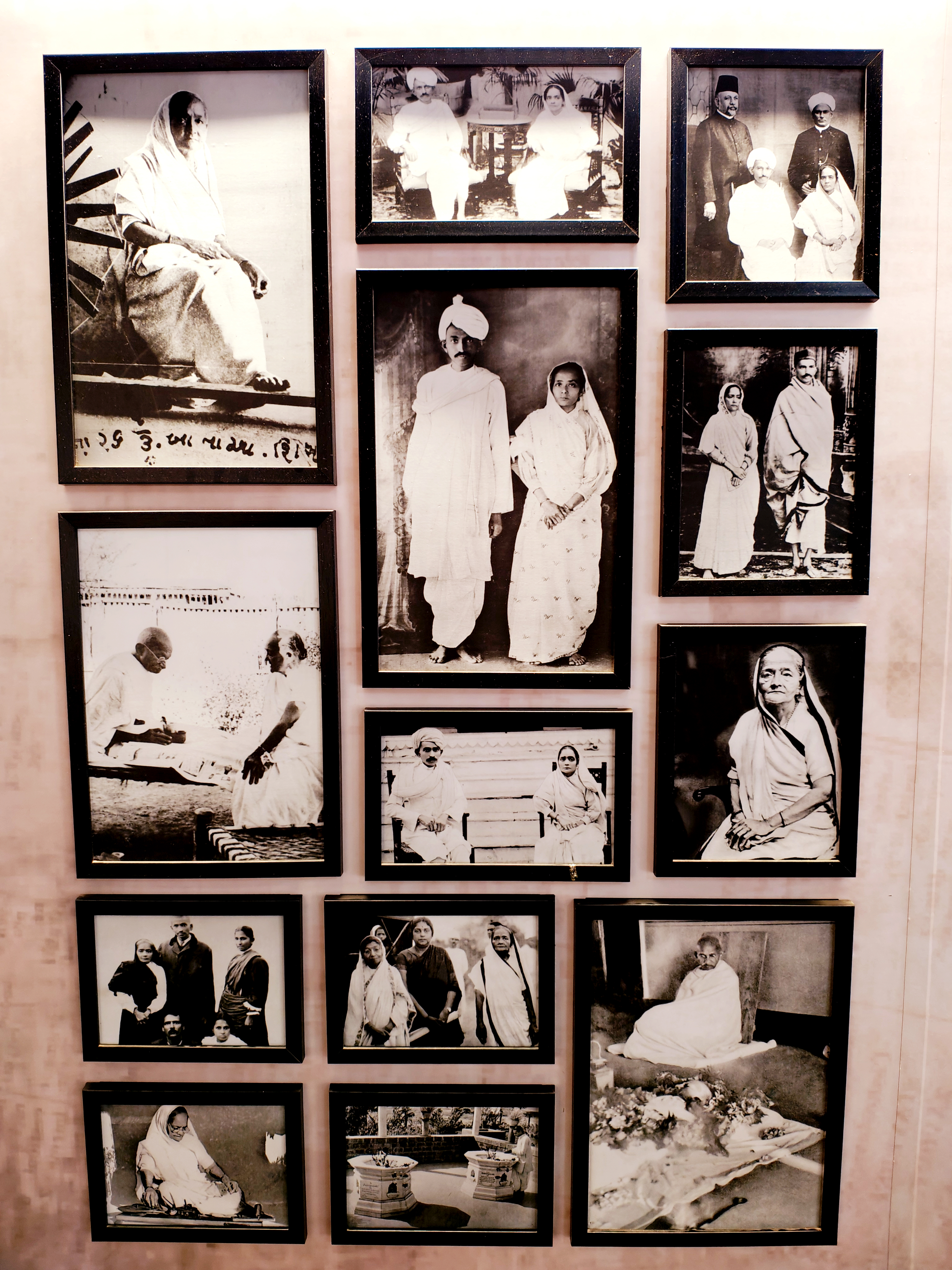
Photos of Mahatma Gandhi and Kasturba Gandhi

The Gandhi Museum at Aga Khan Palace is spread over six galleries. The galleries exhibit several statues of Gandhi and others. There are several displays complete with charts and diagrams depicting the history of the Quit India Movement.

== Complex ==
The complex covers an area of 19 acres (77,000 m^{2}), out of which 7 acres (28,000 m^{2}) is the built up area. The palace is also the headquarters of the Gandhi National Memorial Society. It also hosts a shop that deals in khadi and other hand loomed textiles. There is also a canteen. The complex also houses the samadhis of Kasturba Gandhi and Mahadev Desai. The marble samadhis contain the shes of both and are octagonal in structure. In 1992 a portion of Mahatma Gandhi's ashes were shifted in the complex and a similar (not replica) samadhi built. The three samadhis are enclosed in a walled complex with marble flooring and surrounded by a low wall.

== Activities organised at the palace ==
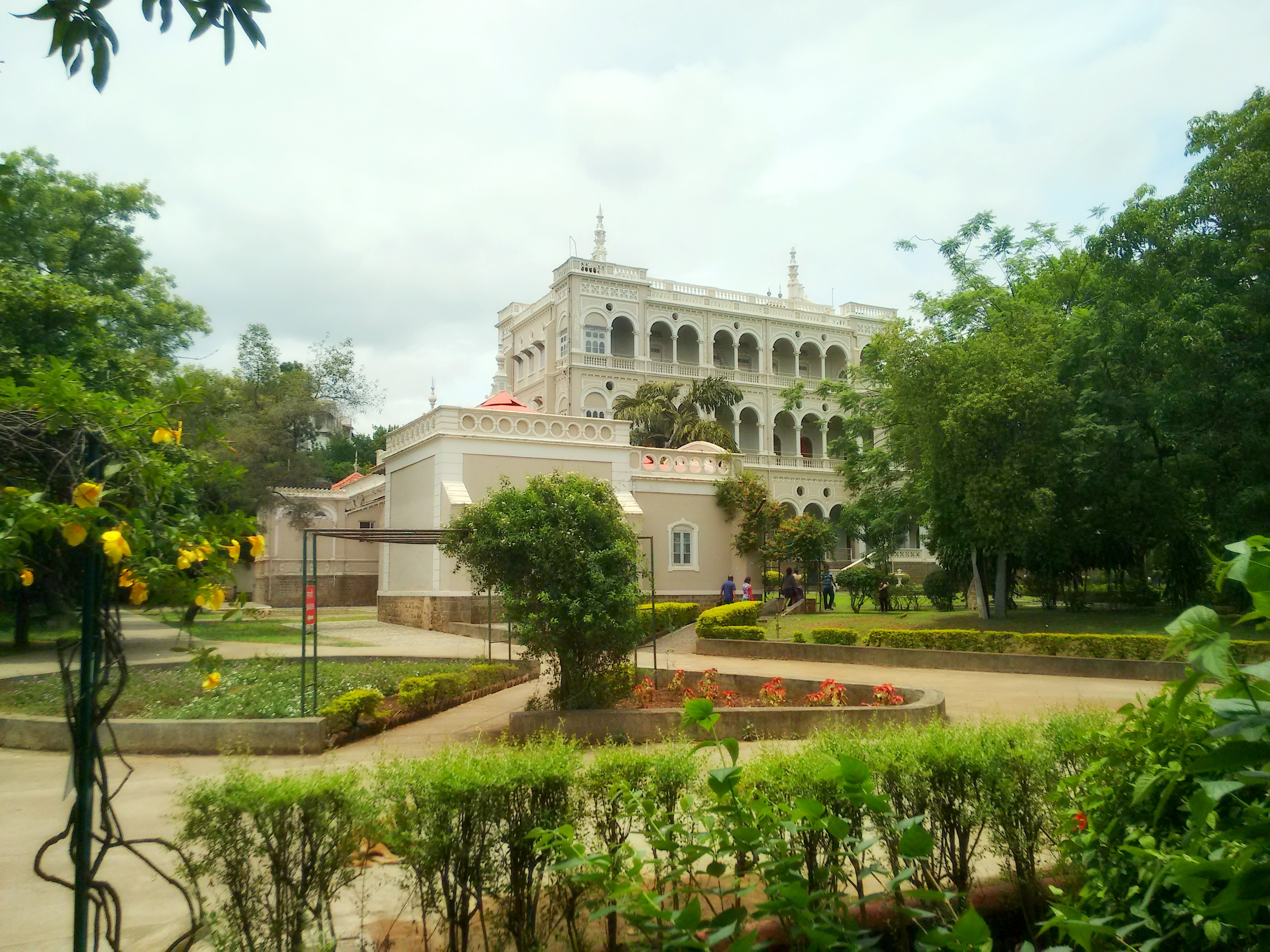
Aga Khan Palace as viewed from the left rear side

Gandhi Memorial society celebrates the following public functions at the palace:

- Martyr's Day – 30 January.
- Mahashivratri – Kasturbha Gandhi's Death Day Celebrated As Mother's Day.
- Independence Day – 15 August.
- Republic Day – 26 January.
- Mahatma Gandhi's Birth Anniversary – 2 October.

Other than yearly events, morning prayer sessions are held daily at the samadhi since decades. The prayer draws huge crowds everyday, and the number goes up threefold on 2 October as people visit the place to pay tribute to Mahatma Gandhi.

== Gallery ==
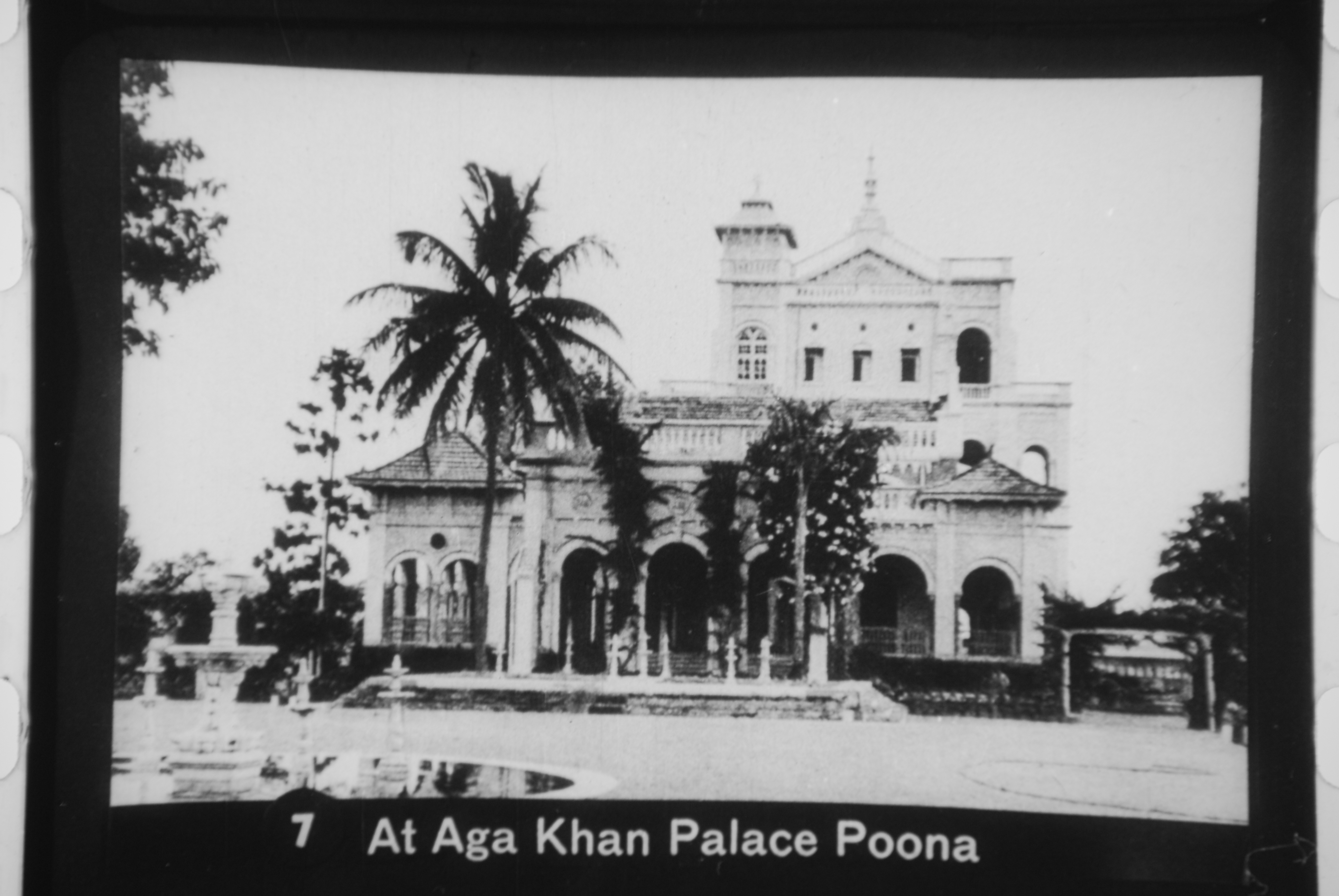
A scanned image of Aga Khan Palace before India's independence.

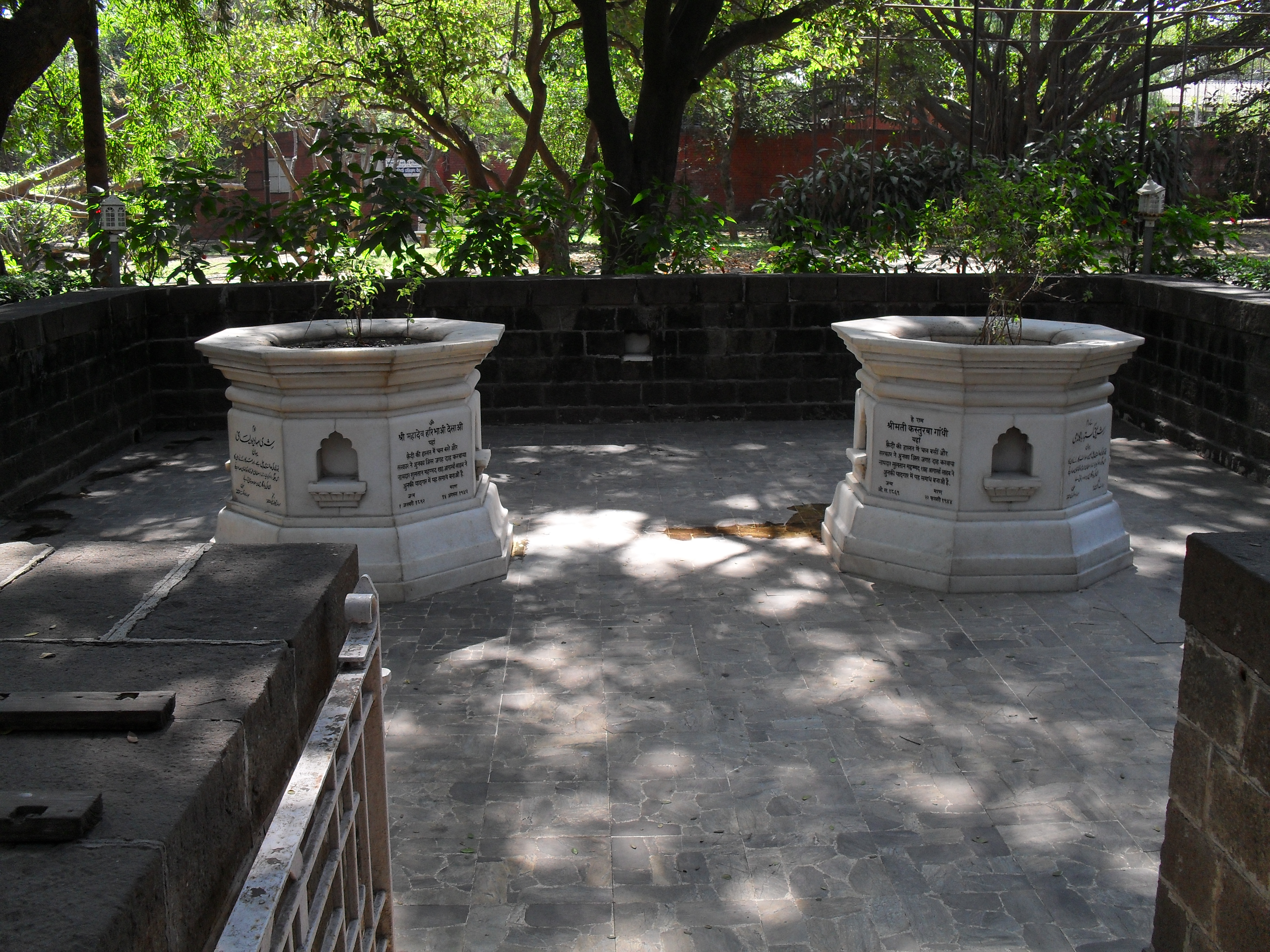
Kasturba Gandhi Memorial Stone (One on the right) with the memorial stone of Mahadev Desai in the palace where she died.

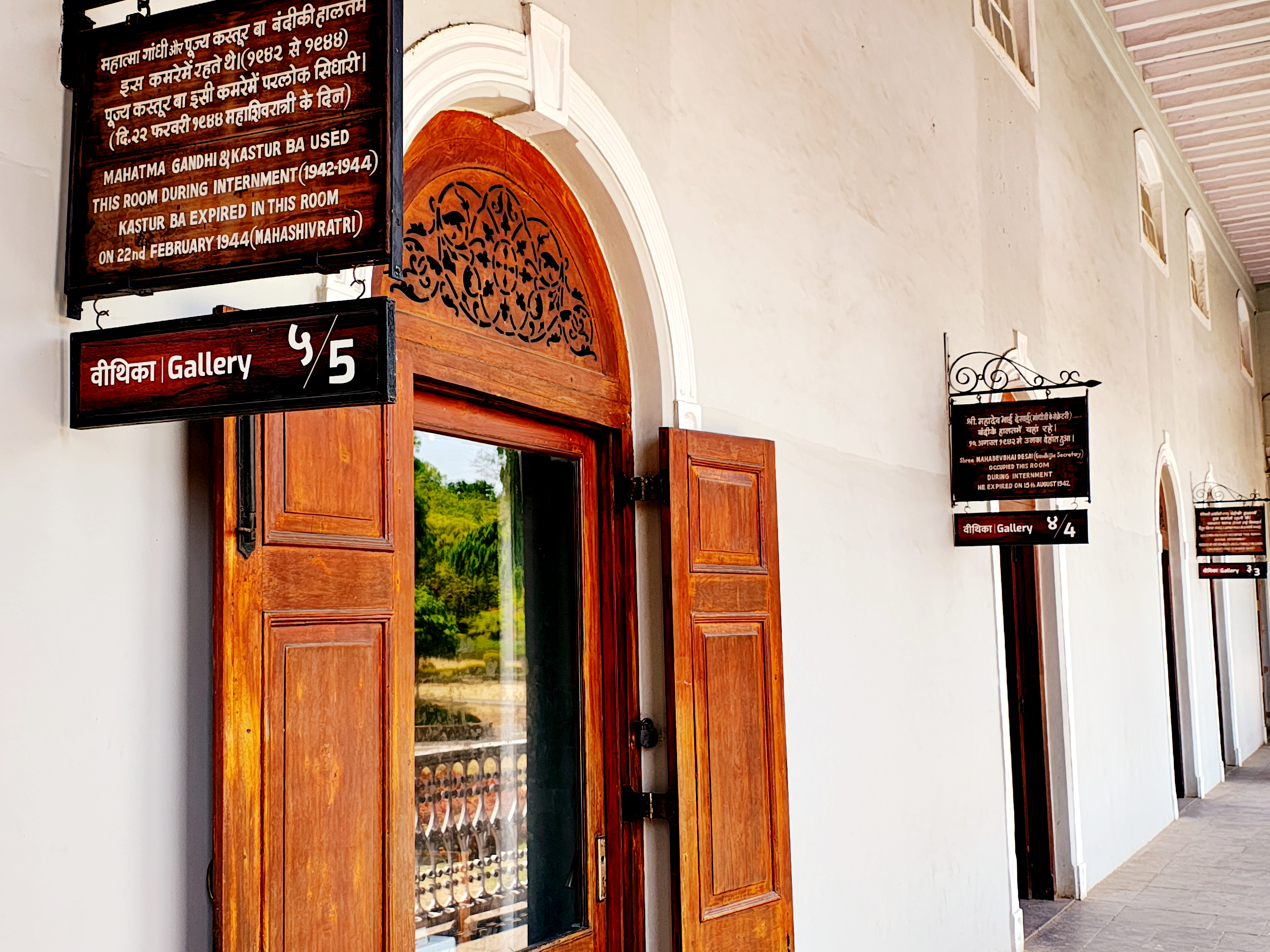
Rooms where Mahatma Gandhi, Kasturba Gandhi and Mahadev Desai were Interned

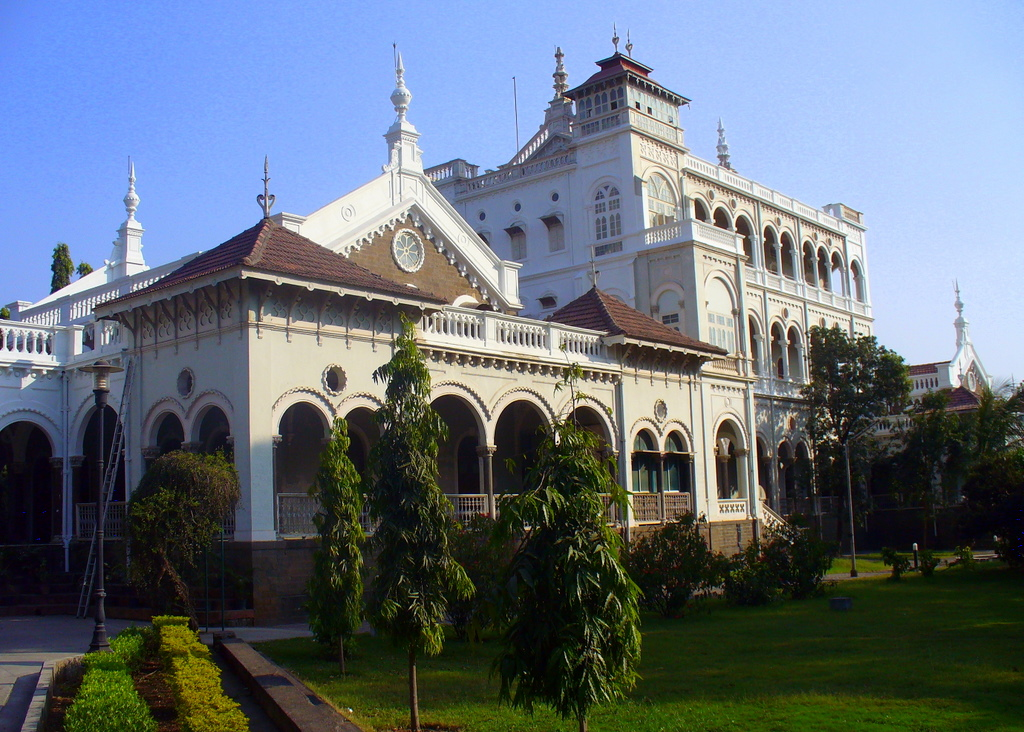
Distance view of the palace.

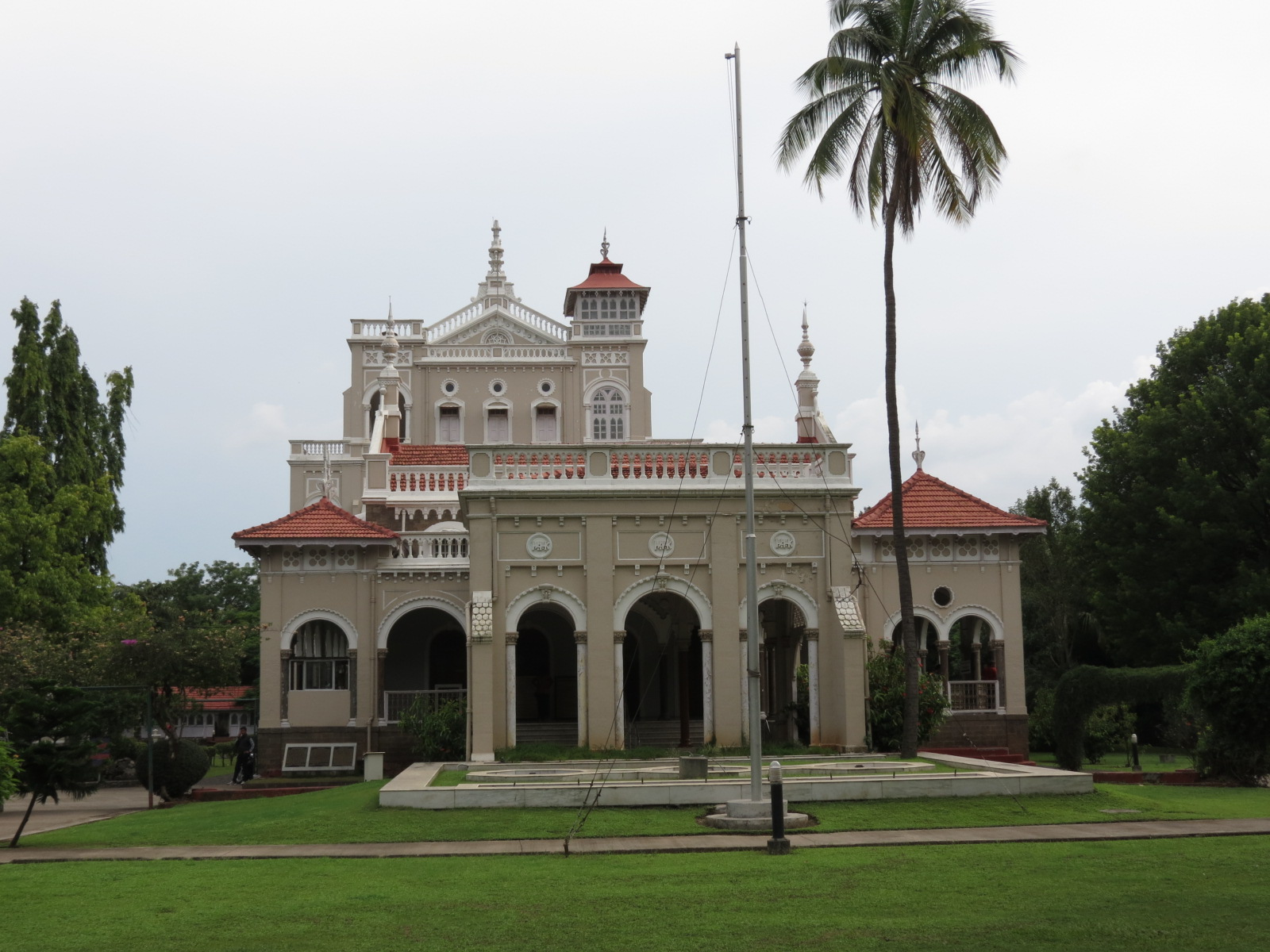
Front View of the palace

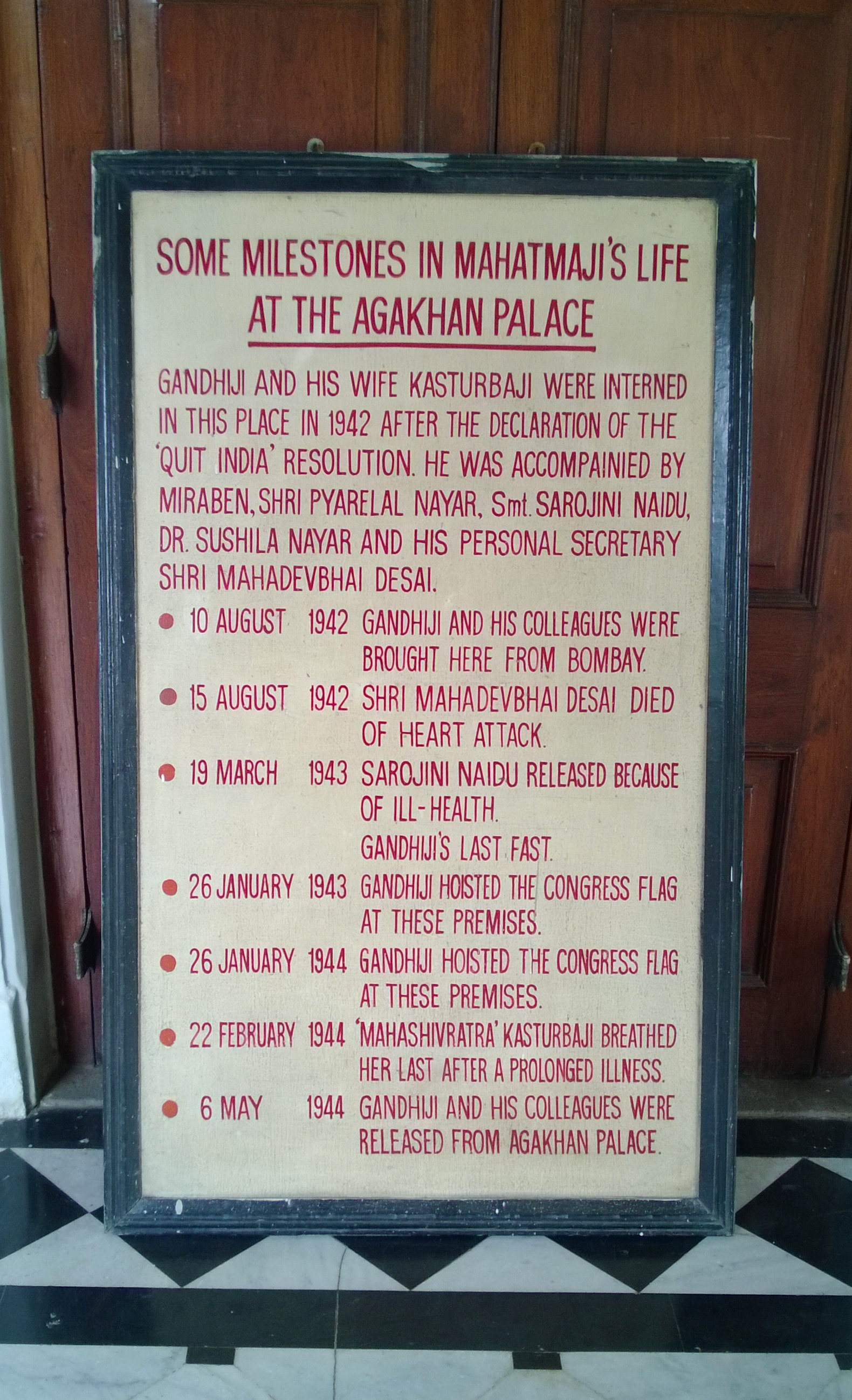
Milestones related to Mahatma Gandhi at Aga Khan Palace

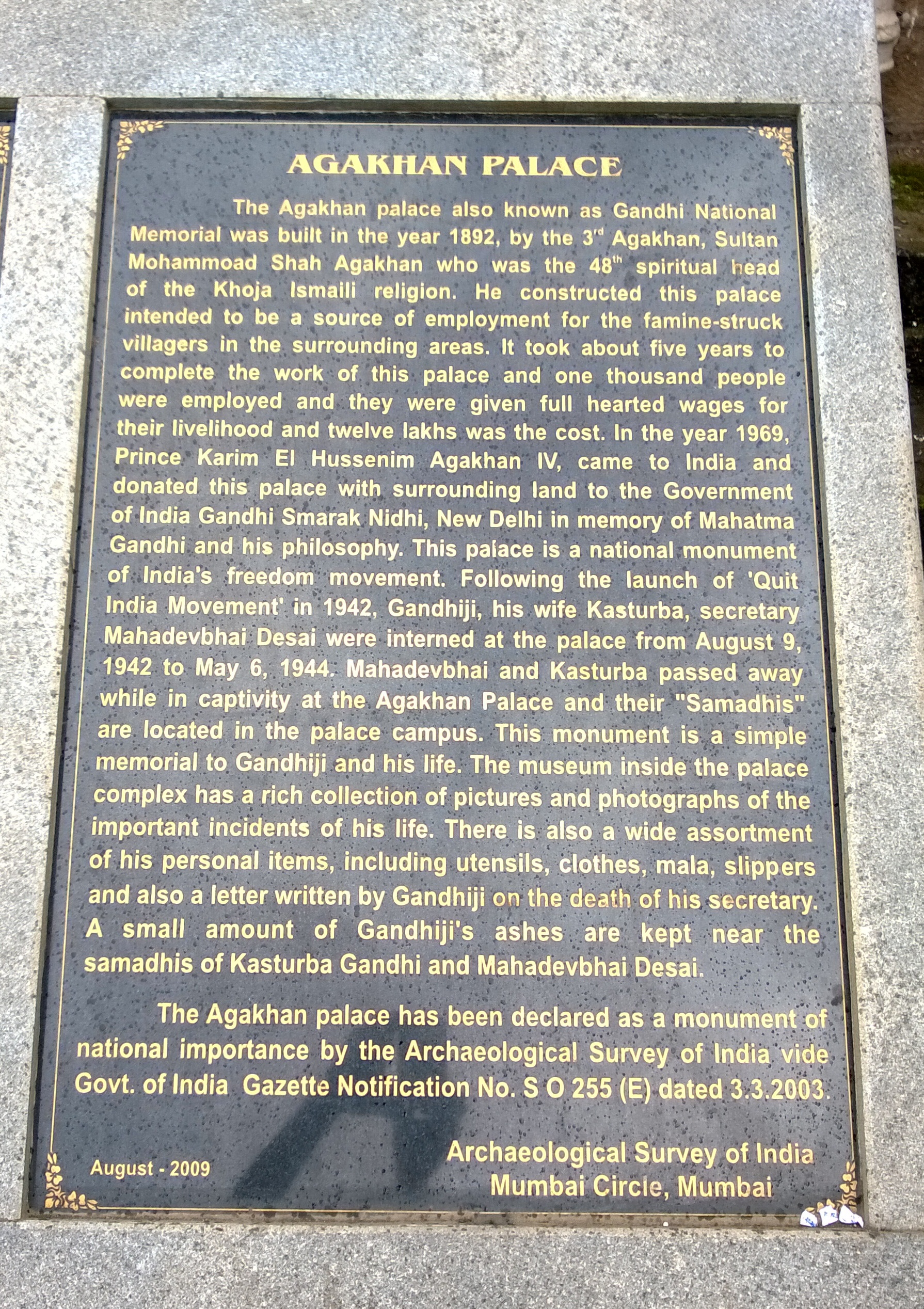
Information Plaque at Aga Khan Palace

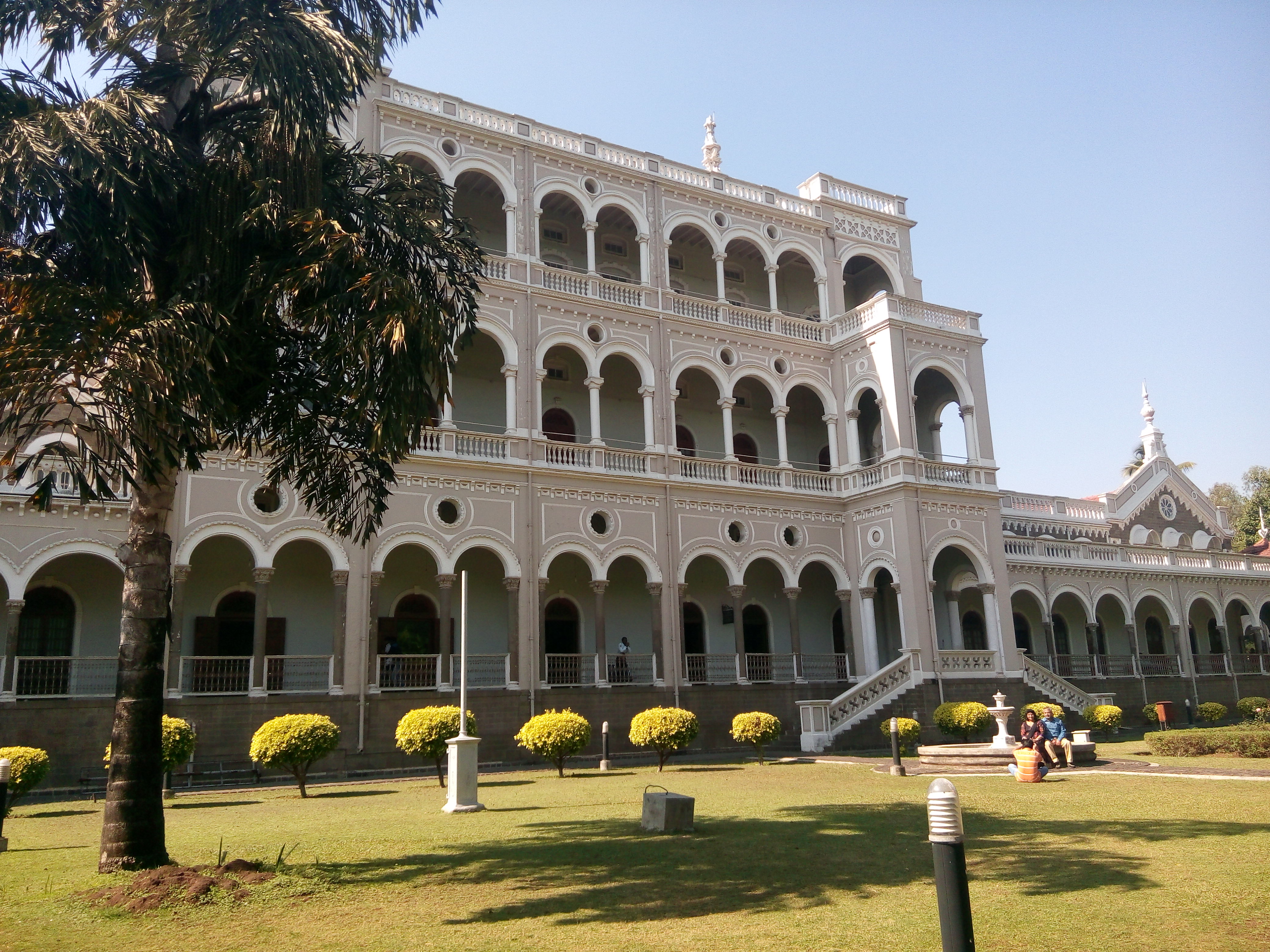
Aga Khan Palace Side View
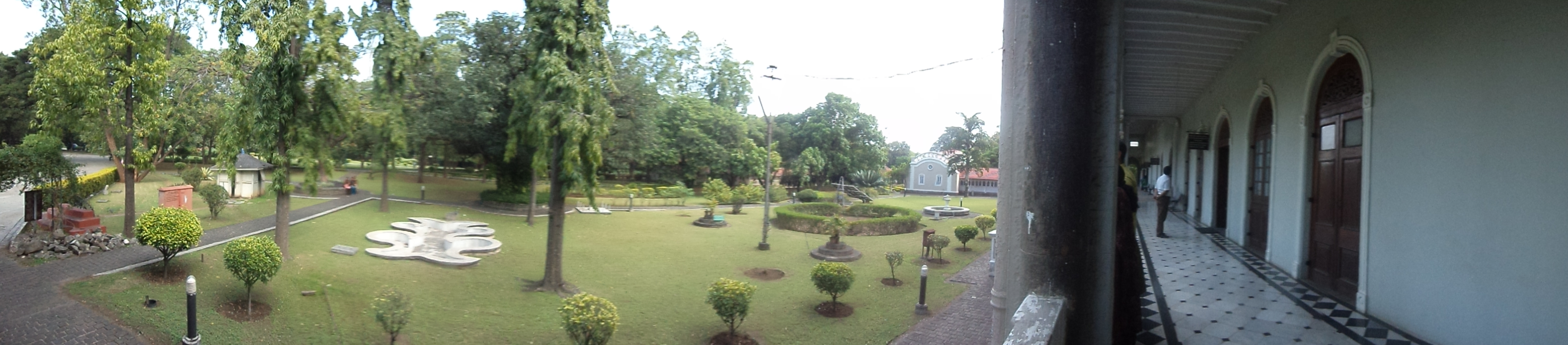
Panoramic view from the palace

== See also ==
- Mahatma Gandhi and the Quit India Movement
- Mani Bhavan
- Aga Khan III
- Aga Khan IV
- House of Asaf Jah
- Reserve Bank of India
