= Rabindra Nath Upadhyay =

Indian social worker and Gandhian

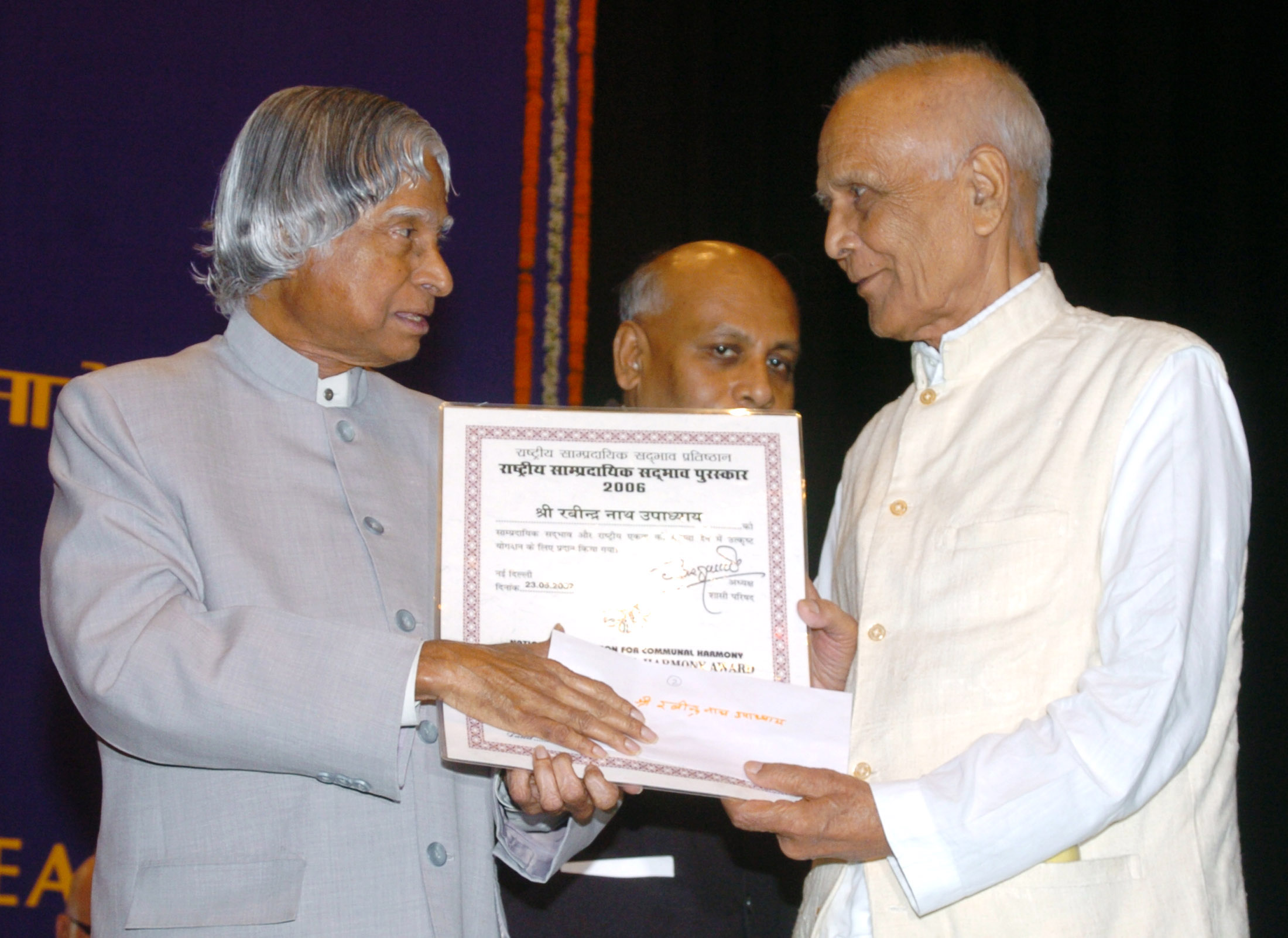
- Upadhyay (right) with A. P. J. Abdul Kalam in 2007
- Born: 1923; Ballia District, Uttar Pradesh, India
- Died: 12 April 2010 (aged 86–87); Guwahati, Assam, India
- Occupation: Social worker
- Known for: Tamulpur Anchalik Gramdan Sangha
- Awards: Padma Shri; Jamnalal Bajaj Award; Friends of North-east Award; National Communal Harmony Award

Rabindra Nath Upadhyay (1923–2010) was an Indian social worker, Gandhian and the founder of Tamulpur Anchalik Gramdan Sangha (TAGS), a non governmental organization working for the social development of the rural people in the Kumarikata village of Assam. He was a recipient of the 2003 Jamnalal Bajaj Award. The Government of India awarded him the fourth highest civilian award of the Padma Shri, in 2000, for his services to the society.

== Biography ==
Upadhyay was born in a small village (Sarayan, Ujiyar Ghat) in Ballia District of the Indian state of Uttar Pradesh in 1923 and did his college studies at Banaras Hindu University. Attracted by the ideals of Subash Chandra Bose, he joined the Indian independence movement during his school days and is said to have been involved in armed struggle but, after the assassination of Mahatma Gandhi in 1948, he abandoned violent politics to pursue nonviolence. Associating himself with Vinoba Bhave and his Bhoodan Movement, he joined Shram Bharati, a Gandhian community, in 1951, to work alongside renowned Gandhians such as Jayaprakash Narayan, Dhirendra Majumdar and Acharya Ramamurti. When the Sino-Indian War broke out in 1962, he moved to the Assam border and worked there as a Shanti Sainik.

In Assam, he chose Tamulpur village, on advice from Amalprava Das, the head of local Shanti Sena, and founded the Tamulpur Anchalik Gramdan Sangha (TAGS), a non governmental organization in Tamulpur village for spreading the Gramodyog (Village industry) ideals, under the aegis of which he promoted cottage industries such as silk, khadi, honey and oil. The organization has since become a Khadi Gramodyog Training Center. He also founded a Peace Centre, at Kumarikata village in the Nalbari District. Under the aegis of these organizations, he established a common granary to act as a food depository for use in times of need and arranged for financial assistance to free up land from the local land owners. Establishment of Creches, low cost sanitation, biogas plants and drinking water facilities were some of the other contributions of Upadhyay in Assam and Arunachal Pradesh. He was also involved with relief operations when famine affected the area.

Aligning with Khadi and Village Industries Commission, Upadhyay started New Weavers' Training Centre for training villagers in cottage industries and set up buildings, work-sheds, hostels and equipment such as oil presses and bee-boxes for the farmers and artisans. When the Union Government decided to evict all refugees migrated from the erstwhile East Pakistan and settled in Tamulpur, he protested and declared a peaceful satyagraha which persuaded the government to revoke the decision. His opposition to the secessionist activities of Bodo people exposed him to physical assault by the militants. During the Emergency period, he also suffered incarceration for protesting against the government.

Upadhyay was married to Shakuntala Devi, who was also involved in his social activities. He died on 12 April 2010, at Guwahati, at the age of 87.

== Awards and honours ==
The Government of India included him in the 2000 Republic Day honours list for the civilian award of the Padma Shri for his services to the society. In 2003, he was awarded the Jamnalal Bajaj Award for constructive work by Jamnalal Bajaj Foundation. The next year he received the Friends of North-east Award and the National Foundation for Communal Harmony (NFCH), an autonomous body under the Ministry of Home Affairs honoured him with the National Communal Harmony Award in 2006 which he received from A. P. J. Abdul Kalam, the then President of India, on 23 May 2007.

== See also ==
- Shanti Sena
- Khadi Gramodyog
- Subash Chandra Bose
- Mahatma Gandhi
- Vinoba Bhave
- Bhoodan Movement
- Jayaprakash Narayan
- Amalprava Das
- Acharya Ramamurti
