= Ghelubhai Nayak =

Ghelubhai Naik (1924 – 16 January 2015), popularly called Ghelukaka, was an activist and Gandhian from Gujarat, India.

== Life ==
Ghelubhai Naik was born in 1924 to Laxmiben in Kolva village near Gandevi, Valsad district, Gujarat. He first met Mahatma Gandhi at Rentiyashala of Amalsad when he was eleven. He studied Master of Social Welfare at Tata Institute of Social Science, Mumbai. He and his brother Chhotubhai Naik, were mentored by Jugatram Dave. In 1948, both brothers went to tribal Dang district when Sardar Vallabhbhai Patel asked them. As a Sarvodaya worker, he co-founded Dang Swaraj Ashram with his brother and Chunilal Vaidya at Ahwa to promote education and social reforms in tribals. He helped in establishment of the first Ashram Shala (residential school for tribal children) at Kalibel in 1949. Later, more than hundred Ashram Shala were opened in tribal areas. He also organized a health and cleanliness awareness programme called Gam chalyu nahva (village goes to bath).

During Mahagujarat Movement, he helped in prevention accession of Dang district with Maharashtra. He also opposed Christian Missionaries converting tribals in Dang to Christianity.

He died on 16 January 2015 at Ahwa, Gujarat.

== Awards ==
He received Gramseva Award of the Gujarat Vidyapith in 1999.
