= Biswanath Pattnaik =

Indian social worker and tribal rights activist (1916–2010)

- Born: 11 November 1916; Kumarada, Ganjam, India
- Died: 29 May 2010 (aged 93); Odisha, India
- Known for: Bhoodan movement, social and educational work among tribal communities
- Parents: Upendra Pattnaik (father); Indumati (mother)

Biswanath Pattnaik (11 November 1916 – 29 May 2010) was an Indian Gandhian activist and social worker involved in the Sarvodaya and Bhoodan movements. He received the Jamnalal Bajaj Award in 2008 for his contributions to social, medical, and educational programmes in areas with significant tribal populations, particularly Kujendri and Baliguda in Odisha, India.

== Early life ==
Pattnaik was born on 11 November 1916 in a Karan family at Kumarada, in the present-day Ganjam district of Odisha. His father, Upendra Pattnaik, died during his childhood, after which he was raised by his grandfather, Ghanashyam Pattnaik. He studied at the local village school and later in Srikakulam, Andhra Pradesh, until Class 8.

At the age of 17, he began working as an informal teacher at his village school, earning a salary of seven rupees per month. Around this time, he met and was influenced by the Gandhian leader Gopabandhu Choudhury. Under Choudhury’s guidance, Pattnaik travelled to Koraput in 1940 to help promote Khadi and the broader Swadeshi initiatives.

== Activism and social work ==
Pattnaik took part in the movement for the formation of a separate Odisha (then called Utkal) state and was also involved in other nationalist movements of the time. He contributed to the Banabasi Seva Samiti (established by Gopabandhu Choudhury in 1972), focusing on education and welfare programmes for tribal communities. The organisation ran residential schools for tribal children, orphanages, and old-age homes.

He was often called the “Koraputia Gandhi” for his work in popularising Khadi and advocating for tribal rights. Pattnaik campaigned against social discrimination and opposed the practice of untouchability. Under his leadership, people belonging to the Scheduled Castes and Scheduled Tribes entered the Hindu temple at Kujendri for the first time. He also participated in the Quit India movement.

Pattnaik led the Bhoodan movement in the Koraput area, encouraging land donations aimed at uplifting tribal and marginalised communities.

== Awards ==
Pattnaik received numerous awards, including:

- Best Social Worker Award from Bharatiya Adimajati Sevak Sangh (1995)
- Justice Rajkishore Das Samman (1996)
- Sarala Award (2002)
- Rajiv Gandhi Sadbhavana Award (2003)
- Pradyumna Bala Sammana
- Kondhamala Citizen Forum Felicitation Award
- Jamnalal Bajaj Award (2008)

Film-maker Ajaya Bharadwaj has begun work on a documentary film chronicling Pattnaik’s life and contributions.

== Death ==
Pattnaik died on 29 May 2010 in Baliguda, Kandhamal district, Odisha, at the age of 93.

== See also ==
- Gandhism
- Life history of Biswanath Pattnaik
