= Hema Bharali =

Indian freedom activist (1919–2020)

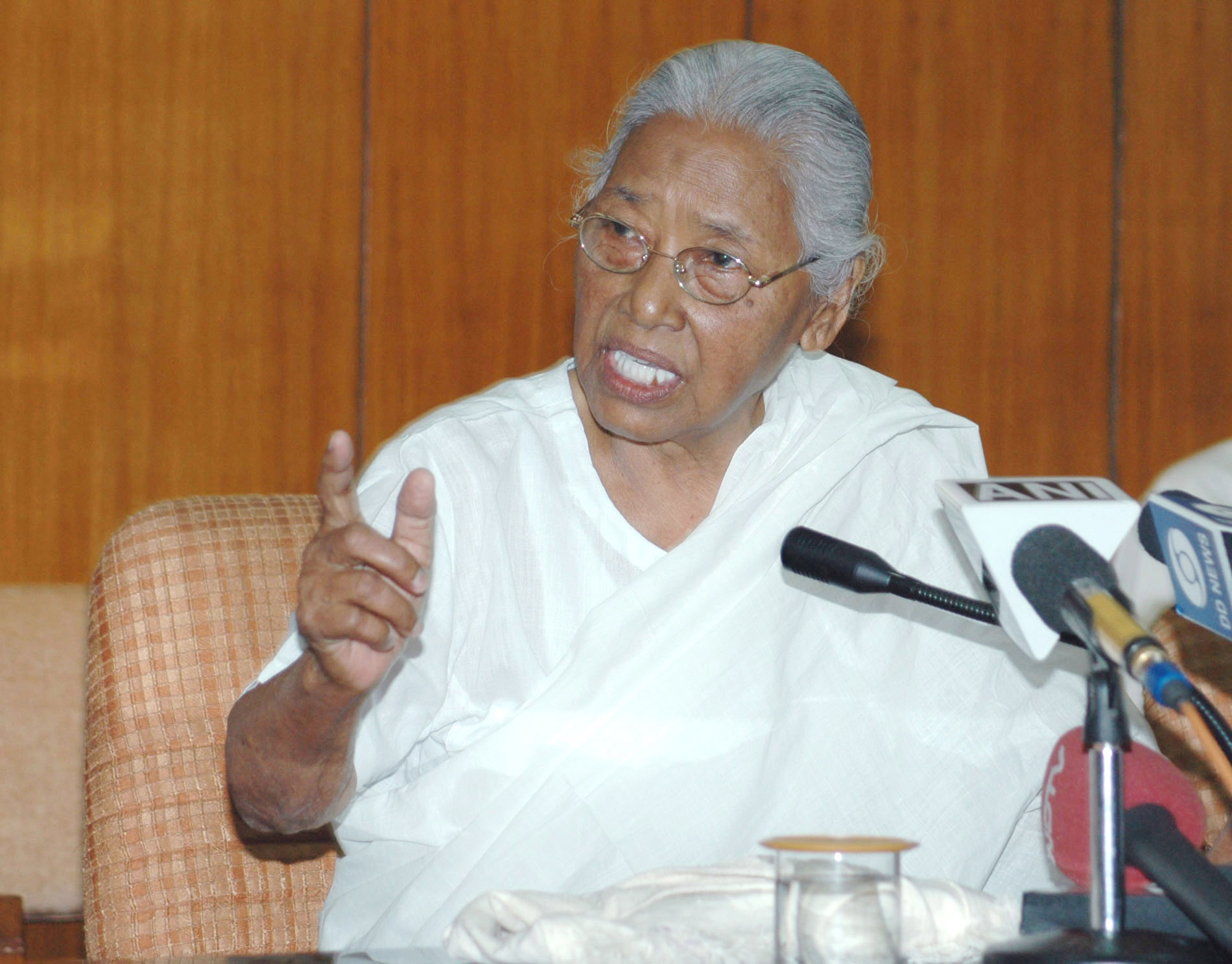
- Hema Bharali addressing a press conference in 2006
- Born: 19 February 1919; Assam Province, British India
- Died: 29 April 2020 (aged 101); Assam, India
- Resting place: Mumbai
- Occupations: Social worker Freedom fighter Gandhian; Sarvodaya leader
- Years active: 1950–2020
- Awards: Padma Shri; National Communal Harmony Award; Fakhruddin Ali Ahmed Memorial Award

Hema Bharali (19 February 1919 – 29 April 2020) was an Indian freedom activist, social worker, Sarvodaya leader and Gandhian, known for her contributions for the empowerment of women and efforts towards the upliftment of the socially and financially challenged sections of the society. She was reported to have been active during the relief operations in the wake of the earthquake in North Lakhimpur of Assam state in 1950 and in the development activities after the Sino-Indian War of 1962. The Government of India awarded her the fourth highest civilian honour of the Padma Shri, in 2005, for her contributions to Indian society. A year later, she received the National Communal Harmony Award from the National Foundation for Communal Harmony, an autonomous organization under the Ministry of Home Affairs.

== Early life and work ==
Hema Bharali was born on 19 February 1919 in a family of Chutia ethnicity in the Northeast Indian state of Assam and is known to have taken to social work from an early age. She became active in the Indian freedom struggle and when the earthquake caused devastation in North Lakhimpur area in 1950, she took part in the relief operations. A year later, she joined the Bhoodan movement launched by Vinoba Bhave in 1951 and became one of its leaders. She was a part of the team, led by Vinoba Bhave, who were involved in the service of the victims of the war-torn area of Tezpur and stayed at Maitreyi Ashram of Bhave during the operations. She has also been involved with the Padayatra in connection with the Bhoodan movement and was a founder member of the executive council of the Central Social Welfare Board (CSWB).

== Awards ==
The Government of India included Bharali in the 2005 Republic Day Honours list for the fourth highest civilian award of the Padma Shri. In 2006, she was awarded the National Communal Harmony Award by the National Foundation for Communal Harmony of the Ministry of Home Affairs. Three years later, she received the Fakhruddin Ali Ahmed Memorial Award for National Integration from the Government of Assam. Bharali, a spinster by choice, endured financial and health challenges in her 90s and received financial assistance from the State Government. She lived in Guwahati, in Assam. As of April 2016, she continued to make public appearances.

== Death ==
She died on 29 April 2020, at age 81.

== See also ==
- Sarvodaya
- Vinoba Bhave
