= Radha Bahin Bhatt =

Indian social worker (born 1931)

- Born: Radha Bhatt; October 16, 1931 (age 94); Dhurka village, near Almora, Uttarakhand, India
- Occupations: Social worker, Environmentalist, Activist
- Known for: Women's empowerment, Environmental conservation, Gandhian activism, Chipko movement
- Awards: Padma Shri (2025); Jamnalal Bajaj Award (1991)

Radha Bahin Bhatt (born October 16, 1931), also known as Radha Bhatt, is an Indian Gandhian social worker, environmentalist, and women's empowerment activist from Uttarakhand. She was awarded the Padma Shri, India's fourth-highest civilian honor, in 2025 in the field of social work.

== Early life and inspiration ==
Radha Bahin Bhatt was born on October 16, 1931 in Dhurka village, near Almora, Uttarakhand. She was deeply influenced by Sarla Behn, a prominent Gandhian social activist who was a disciple of Mahatma Gandhi.

In 1951, she joined Sarla Behn at the Kasturba Mahila Utthan Mandal in Kausani, an ashram dedicated to the upliftment and education of women in the hills of Uttarakhand.

== Activism ==
Radha Bhatt's activism was deeply influenced by her Gandhian philosophy. In 1957, she actively participated in the Bhoodan movement initiated by Vinoba Bhave, joining padayatras (foot marches) for land reform across Uttar Pradesh and Assam. Over the subsequent decades, she became an influential voice of social change in Uttarakhand. She started running the Kasturba Mahila Uthan Mandal in 1966. She established vocational training schools for women, teaching skills like spinning, weaving, and knitting to make them self-sufficient. She also spearheaded initiatives like the 'One Hour School' for girls to improve access to education. Her efforts included organising women against alcoholism, which led to the closure of liquor shops in several districts.

During the 1970s, as conservation concerns in Himalayas grew, she became an active participant in the Chipko movement, a non-violent grassroots resistance where villagers, predominantly women, embraced trees to prevent their felling. Her activism further extended to advocating for sustainable development practices, and campaigning against open mining operations and large dam constructions in the fragile mountain ecology that threatened local ecosystems and livelihoods. Alongside these protests, she led significant afforestation drives, contributing to the planting of thousands of trees across the Pithoragarh and Almora districts.

Over her long career, Radha Bhatt has held significant leadership positions in various national Gandhian organizations. She served as the chairperson of the Gandhi Peace Foundation in Delhi and has been closely associated with the Himalaya Sewa Sangh and the Kasturba Gandhi National Memorial Trust, continuing to promote the principles of Gram Swaraj (village self-rule) and Sarvodaya (progress for all).

== Awards and recognition ==
- Padma Shri (2025)
- Jamnalal Bajaj Award (1991)

== See also ==
- Sarla Behn
- Chipko movement
- Gandhism
