= Chunilal Vaidya =

Indian activist and Gandhian

Chunibhai Vaidya (2 September 1917 – 19 December 2014), popularly called Chunikaka, was an Indian activist, author and a Gandhian ideologue from Gujarat, India.

== Life ==
Chunibhai Vaidya was born on 2 September 1918 in a small village in Patan district, Gujarat. He was a Gandhian and a Sarvodaya veteran. He participated in Indian independence movement and later in Vinoba Bhave's Bhoodan Movement. He worked for peace in Assam when violence broke out in 1960s. He was an editor of Bhumiputra. He opposed the Emergency imposed by Indira Gandhi in 1975 and was imprisoned. He also founded Gujarat Lok Samiti, a voluntary organization, in 1980. During draught from 1986 to 1988 in Gujarat, he was involved in relief work and construction of check dams in Patan district irrigating 12000 hectares of land. He was also critical of 2002 Gujarat violence.

Vaidya wrote Assassination of Gandhi : Facts and Falsehood which was translated and published in eleven languages.

He died on 19 December 2014 at Ahmedabad aged 97. He was cremated at Dadhichi crematorium in Vadaj area of the city.

== Awards ==
He received Sane Guruji Nirbhay Patrakarita Award for his journalism. He also received Vishva Gujarati Pratibha award by Vishva Gujarati Samaj. He was awarded the Jamnalal Bajaj Award in 2010.
