= Kujendri =

- Village
- Location in Odisha, India Kujendri (India)
- Coordinates: 19°07′47″N 83°46′11″E
- Country: India
- State: Odisha
- District: Rayagada

Government
  - Type: Democratic

Languages
  - Official: Odia
- Time zone: UTC+5:30 (IST)
- PIN: 765023
- Telephone code: 06862
- Vehicle registration: OD 18
- Website: odisha.gov.in

Kujendri is a small village of Rayagada district in the state of Odisha, India. There is a Govt. High school of the welfare department since 1949. The veteran Gandhian and Jamnalal Bajaj award winner Biswanath Pattnaik came to kujendri in around 1940, founded Banabasi Seva Samiti and worked for the development of local tribal people. The village is well known as the birthplace of the tribal lady freedom fighter Sandi Sabara. who met Sri Patnaik there and worked in the Bhoodan movement. Kujendri was an important place in the history of Bhoodan movement. The Bhoodan activists in a padayatra, in the leadership of Acharya Vinoba Bhave reached here on 8 March 1952 and mobilised the people of the area to donate lands. It also has a temple-"Trinath temple", built by late Appana Choudhury.

== Demography ==
Kujendri is a tribal-dominated village. The population of the village, as per Indian census 2011 is 3108, with 1594 males and 1514 females.

== Geography ==
Kujendri is situated at lat. 19°7′47″N 83°46′11″E and towards 43 km east of the dist. Headquarters as well as the nearest railway station Gunupur.
