= Shakuntala Choudhary =

Indian social worker (1920–2022)

- Born: Shakuntala Choudhary; 25 June 1920; Assam, British India
- Died: 20 February 2022 (aged 101); Assam, India
- Other names: Shakunthala Baideo
- Occupations: Social worker; Gandhian
- Organization: Kasturba Gandhi National Memorial Trust (KGNMT)
- Known for: Promoting Gandhian ideals, Social work, Bhoodan Movement
- Awards: Padma Shri (2022); Jamnalal Bajaj Award (2010)

Shakuntala Choudhary (25 June 1920 – 20 February 2022), also known as Shakunthala Baideo, was an Indian social worker. Born in Assam, British Raj, she was known for her commitment and devotion to the popularization of the Gandhian way of life.

== Biography ==
In 1947, at age 26, Choudhary joined the Assam branch of the Kasturba Gandhi National Memorial Trust (KGNMT) and continued her association with the Trust for the rest of her life. The Assam Branch of the Trust is located at South Sarania Hills of Guwahati. This branch of the Trust, known as the Kasturba Ashram or the Sarania Ashram, was inaugurated by Mahatma Gandhi on 9 January 1946.

After her education at Handique Girls College, Guwahati, where she was a student of the batch of students, Shakuntala Choudhary became a teacher at Guwahati's TC School. While serving as teacher in the school, she came into contact with Amalprava Das, a devout Gandhian, whose father had donated his Sarania Hills property for setting up the ashram. As requested by Das, Chowdhary joined the Ashram and helped run the Gram Sevika Vidyalaya and manage the Assam Branch of KGNMT. She became the office secretary of the Trust branch and simultaneously worked as a teacher at the TC School. Choudhary succeeded Das as KGNMT's head in 1955 and continued in that position for 20 years witnessing many developments like the Chinese aggression, the Tibetan refugee crisis, the language stir of 1960. During this period, Shakuntala Choudhary organized Shanti Sena activities on the international borders.

== Association with Vinoba Bhave ==
Shakuntala Choudhary was closely associated with Vinoba Bhave, who was the initiator of the Bhoodan Movement. She travelled with him into the interiors of Assam, translating his lectures from Hindi to Assamese and leading the Maitri Ashram on the Assam Arunachal border, which he founded. She was an active participant in the year-and-half-long Padayatra undertaken by Vinoba Bhave in Assam during the last leg of his Bhoodan movement. In 1973, Vino Bhave entrusted Choudhary to organize the Padayatra in Assam as a part of the nationwide program organized by Bhave.

At Vinoba Bhave's instance, who was interested in promoting Devanagari script among different linguistic groups, Shakuntala Choudhary started a monthly magazine "Asomiya Vishwa Nagari" in Devanagari script, which she edited for many years. The magazine is still published, highlighting Gandhian ideals, thoughts, and spirituality. Choudhary was also associated with of the "Ban Cow Slaughter Satyagraha" started by Vinoba Bhave in 1978.

== Personal life and death ==
Choudhary died on 20 February 2022, at the age of 101.

== Awards and honours ==
- Jamnalal Bajaj Award in 2010 for the Development and Welfare of Women And Children
- In 2022, the Government of India conferred the Padma Shri award, the third highest award in the Padma series of awards, on Shakuntala Choudhary for her distinguished service in the field of social work. The award is in recognition of her service as a "102 year old Gandhian social worker from Kamrup".
