= Anil Sadgopal =

Indian educator and activist

- Known for: Hoshangabad Science Teaching Programme; RTE advocacy
- Awards: Jamnalal Bajaj Award; Homi Bhabha Award in Science Education

Academic background
- Education: Indian Agricultural Research Institute; Caltech

Academic work
- Discipline: Educationist
- Institutions: Tata Institute of Fundamental Research; Kishore Bharati; University of Delhi
- Main interests: School science education; universal access to elementary education

Anil Sadgopal is an Indian educationist and activist, known for the Hoshangabad Science Teaching Programme and for advocacy related to the Right to Education (RTE) Act. He is a recipient of several awards and honours, including the Jamnalal Bajaj Award for 'Application of Science and Technology for Rural Development'. He was instrumental in setting up Eklavya foundation in 1982. For over a decade, he was professor of education at Delhi University, and headed its department of education during 1998–2001. Since 2004–2005, he has been campaigning for changes in the RTE Act, which he believes is flawed.

== Early life ==
Anil Sadgopal's father taught chemical technology at Banaras Hindu University, while his mother was a homemaker. He studied in Birla Vidya Mandir, Nainital, and St. Stephen's College, Delhi. His early experiences in school helped to shape his later views on the mother tongue as the medium of instruction. He obtained his master's degree in plant physiology from the Indian Agricultural Research Institute, New Delhi. In 1961 he went to the California Institute of Technology for doctoral studies in biochemistry and molecular biology.

== Career ==
After completing his Ph.D., Sadgopal returned to India in 1968. He held the post of fellow at Tata Institute of Fundamental Research (TIFR), Bombay, during 1968–1971. Continuing his biological studies, he set up a tissue culture laboratory in TIFR; however, his vocation lay elsewhere. During this period, he says, “I began visiting villages in remote areas of the country to understand them better. Those were life-changing years."

=== Kishore Bharati and the inception of HSTP ===
In 1971, Sadgopal resigned from TIFR and set up Kishore Bharati, an NGO with its headquarters at Palia Pipariya, a village in Hoshangabad district of Madhya Pradesh. The organisation set out to work in the areas of health and agriculture, as well as education. For example, it promoted low-cost irrigation techniques and worked to spread awareness of animal husbandry. It was recognised by UNEP for its environmentally-sound practices.

Sadgopal's work in school education began in 1972, with the Hoshangabad Science Teaching Programme (HSTP). This was a project which aimed to improve the teaching of science in grades 6-8 of government schools in Hoshangabad district. Initially it ran as a pilot project in 16 rural schools, and was jointly managed by Kishore Bharati and another NGO called Friends' Rural Centre. Because of his academic background, Sadgopal was able to rope in scientists from TIFR and other institutions of higher education and research - particularly Delhi University - as members of the core resource group of HSTP. In 1978 the Government of Madhya Pradesh adopted the programme officially and extended it to all middle schools (grades 6-8) of Hoshangabad district.

=== Bhopal ===
In the early 1980s, Sadgopal played a major role in efforts to establish an institute dedicated to innovation in education. These culminated in the setting up of Eklavya in 1982. With this, the intervention that had begun with HSTP entered a new phase, and Sadgopal ceased to be involved in the day-to-day running of HSTP. Following the Bhopal gas leak tragedy in December 1984, he moved on to a different level of activism, working to secure justice for the gas leak victims. He set up a body called Zahreeli Gas Kand Sangharsh Morcha (Poisonous Gas Affair Struggle Front), which sought to draw attention to the plight of victims by organising conferences, rallies etc.

When the Acharya Ramamurti Committee was constituted in 1990 to review the National Education Policy of 1980, Anil Sadgopal was nominated as one of the members. However, he resigned from the committee in protest against what he perceived as the government's "backtracking on the goal of universalisation of elementary education".

=== Delhi ===
Sadgopal moved to Delhi in 1992. During this period, he researched and wrote a book on assassinated trade unionist Shankar Guha Niyogi. In 1994, he joined the University of Delhi as Professor of Education. During 1998–2001, he served as head of the department of education and dean of the faculty of education. Subsequently he was senior fellow at the Nehru Memorial Museum and Library (2001–2006).

From the 1980s, Sadgopal has been increasingly involved in the people's science movement in India. During 1993–2002, he was the national convener of Bharat Jan Vigyan Jatha, an all-India people’s science network.

=== The RTE act ===
In 2004, Sadgopal was inducted as a member of the Central Advisory Board of Education (CABE), the highest advisory body to the government in matters related to education. During 2004–2005 he was a member of three CABE committees, including the committee which was to draft the RTE Bill. In July 2005, when the draft was presented at a full meeting of CABE, Sadgopal circulated a note, alleging that the draft prepared by the committee had been changed in a major way, diluting the provisions of the proposed act. The government dismissed it as his personal view, and he resigned from the committee. The bill was passed by the Parliament of India in 2009, and the act came into force from 1 April 2010. Subsequently, Sadgopal has been involved in a campaign to modify the RTE Act and bring in a common school system. He was one of the founders of the All India Forum for Right to Education, set up in 2009, and is a member of its presidium.

== Awards and honours ==
- 2018: Conferred "the Homi Bhabha Award" in Science and Education by the Tata Institute of Fundamental Research
- Jamnalal Bajaj Award, 1980
- Vikram Sarabhai Memorial Lecture, 1981
- Rathindra Puraskar, 1984
- Durgabai Deshmukh Memorial Lecture, 2004

== Books authored ==
- Sangharsh aur Nirman (in Hindi, Struggle and Construction), by Anil Sadgopal and Shyam Bahadur 'Namra', Rajkamal Prakashan, New Delhi, 1993. ISBN 81-267-0996-0.
- Political Economy of Education in the Age of Globalisation: De-mystifying the Knowledge Agenda, by Anil Sadgopal, Bharat Jan Vigyan Jatha, 2003.
- Shiksha mein Badlav ka Sawal (in Hindi, The Question of Change in Education), by Anil Sadgopal, Granth Shilpi, 2000. ISBN 817917056X.
