= Anupam Mishra =

Indian environmentalist (1948–2016)

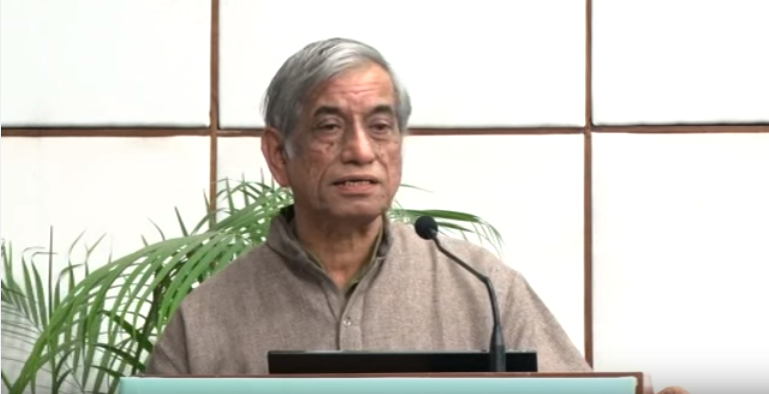
- Born: 1948; Maharashtra, India
- Died: 19 December 2016 (aged 68); New Delhi
- Occupation: environmentalist
- Known for: water conservation, rainwater harvesting

Anupam Mishra (1948 – 19 December 2016) was an Indian Gandhian, author, journalist, environmentalist, TED speaker, and water conservationist who worked on promoting water conservation, water management and traditional rainwater harvesting techniques. He had been awarded the 1996 Indira Gandhi Paryavaran Puraskar (IGPP) award instituted by the Ministry of Environment and Forests, Government of India. He travelled to villages across several Indian states, especially Rajasthan, Madhya Pradesh, Maharashtra, and Uttar Pradesh, describing the value of time-tested systems of water harvesting. He advocated conservation of traditional water structures in India as well as abroad. He wrote books like Aaj Bhi Khare Hain Talaab (Ponds Are Still Relevant, 1993) and Rajasthan Ki Rajat Boondein (Radiant Raindrops of Rajasthan, 1995), landmark works in the field of water conservation. An extensive interview with Mishra about the history and future of the Yamuna River.

== Career ==
Mishra was born in Wardha, Maharashtra state, India in 1948. He worked at the Gandhi Peace Foundation in New Delhi in varying capacities since completing his college education in 1969. He promoted the use of indigenous or traditional knowledge to solve water problem via preservation, maintenance and regeneration of ponds, water management and rain water harvesting.

Working with Chandi Prasad Bhatt, he was one of the early chroniclers of the Chipko movement that flourished through the 1970s in Uttarakhand, and published Chipko movement: Uttarakhand women's bid to save forest wealth in 1978.

In 1993, he published Aaj Bhi Khare Hain Talaab (Ponds Are Still Relevant), written after eight years of field research on traditional pond and water management. Soon, it became a handbook for many non-governmental organizations (NGOs) working on water-harvesting projects. Subsequently, it was translated into 19 languages, including Braille, and sold over 100,000 copies, out of which the National Book Trust published 13 languages, including English. His next book, Rajasthan Ki Rajat Boondein (The Radiant Raindrops of Rajasthan), also documented water harvesting and water management in Western Rajasthan. All his books are copyright free. He spoke on the topic "The ancient ingenuity of water harvesting" in 2009 TED conference. He was editor of the bi-monthly Gandhi Marg, published by the Gandhi Peace Foundation.

== Awards ==
Mishra was awarded the 'Amar Shaheed Chandrasekhar Azad National Award' of 2007–08, instituted by the Government of Madhya Pradesh, Culture Department to "propagate and publicise ideals of freedom struggle, patriotism and social service". He is also the recipient of Jamnalal Bajaj Award for the year 2011.

== Personal life and death ==
Mishra was a true Gandhian in philosophy and practice. Known to be warm and engaging in his demeanor and maintaining his principles throughout his life, he was a role model to many. He died on 20 December 2016 after a 10-month battle with cancer.

== Works ==
- Aaj Bhi Khare Hain Talaab (in Hindi), (English title: Ponds Are Still Relevant), published by Gandhi Shanti Pratishthan, New Delhi On line text, 1993.
- Radiant Raindrops of Rajasthan, translated by Ms. Maya Jani, Research Foundation for Science Technology and Ecology, 1995 On line text.
- Chipko movement: Uttarakhand women's bid to save forest wealth, with Satyendra Tripathi. People's Action, 1978.
- Safa Mathe Ka Samaja , Penguin India (3 October 2006)
