= Jugatram Dave =

Social activist, Indian freedom fighter (1892–1895)

- Born: Jugatram Chimanlal Dave; 1892; Kathiawar, India
- Died: 1985 (aged 92–93)

Jugatram Chimanlal Dave (1892–1985) was a Gandhian social activist, freedom fighter and author from Gujarat, India who is remembered for his social work among the tribals of southern Gujarat.

== Early life and education ==
Dave was born in Kathiawar and schooled in Bombay and went to Baroda in 1915 where he worked as a school teacher under Kakasaheb Kelkar for some years. In 1917 he joined Gandhi at the Kochrab Ashram and later went with him to the Sabarmati Ashram where he came to be regarded as an ideal ashram inmate. He taught at a school in the Ashram and later worked at the Navjivan Press.

== Gandhian activist ==
Responding to Gandhi's call for constructive work after the Non-Cooperation Movement, Dave chose to work on rural development in Bardoli in the Surat district where he joined the Swaraj Ashram in 1924. In Bardoli, Dave's efforts focused on the landless bonded labourers called halpatis and the Raniparaj Adivasis both groups that were exploited by moneylenders, landlords and contractors. Dave focused on spreading education among these groups through the establishment of balwadis and ashramshalas and popularised the spinning wheel among them. While at the Bardoli ashram, he participated in the flood relief efforts in Gujarat in 1927. A Raniparaj Vidyalaya for the education of adivasis was established at Bardoli in 1926 which subsequently shifted to Vedchhi and it was here that Dave worked for the rest of his life.

== Role in the freedom struggle ==
Dave, along with Swami Anand, assisted Sardar Vallabhai Patel in the Bardoli Satyagraha on the wishes of Gandhi. Dave was tasked with covering the Sardar's speeches in Bardoli which he reported to Anand in Surat who in turn brought them to the larger public through newsletters. He served several terms in prison for his participation in the Salt Satyagraha, Individual Satyagraha and the Quit India Movement. He was also associated with the Charkha Sangh, the Talimi Sangh and the All India Village Industries Association.

== Life in independent India ==
Dave worked with Vinobha Bhave and Jaiprakash Narayan in the establishment of the Shanti Sena, an unarmed volunteer force that was formed in the aftermath of the Indo-China War of 1962, that undertook rural reconstruction work in the North East Frontier Agency (NEFA) which had been an important theatre of the war. The Sena later undertook humanitarian work among the refugees from East Pakistan in the run up to the liberation of Bangladesh.

Dave was also deeply interested in issues of education. In 1967, the Vedchhi Ashram founded the Gandhi Vidyapith and the Shanti Sena Vidyalaya. He argued that in independent India basic educational curriculum must not only be productive and schooling rooted in society but also that it should emphasise on national ideas and character formation.

== Notable books and awards ==
Dave was a noted Gujarati biographer who penned the biographies of several prominent leaders of the freedom struggle besides also writing children's literature. Some of his works include Our Bapu, Prahlad, a play for children, Atma Rachana on rural reconstruction and the autobiography Mari Jivanakatha. He was awarded the Jamnalal Bajaj Award for "outstanding contribution in constructive work" in 1978.

== Death and commemoration ==
The Jugatram Dave Ashram Schools Scheme of the Government of Gujarat which provides financial aid to voluntary organisations running ashram schools and to students studying there is named after him. Bapu na Jugatrambhai is a book by Prabhudas Gandhi that chronicles the bond between Gandhi and Dave.

== See also ==
- List of Gujarati-language writers
