= Jamnalal Bajaj Award =

Indian annual Gandhian values award

- Date: 1978
- Country: India
- Presented by: Jamnalal Bajaj Foundation
- Website: https://www.jamnalalbajajawards.org/

Jamnalal Bajaj Award is an Indian award, for promoting Gandhian values, community service and social development. Established in 1978, by the Jamnalal Bajaj Foundation of Bajaj Group, it is given annually in four categories, and usually presented by the President, Vice president, Prime Minister of India or a leading figure. The foundation currently headed by Rahul Bajaj, was created in 1977, in the memory of group founder, philanthropist and a close associate of Mahatma Gandhi, Jamnalal Bajaj. The award ceremony takes place on his birth anniversary, 4 November.

== Awards ==
The award comprises a citation, a trophy and a cheque of Rs Ten lakh each. It is given in four categories, namely:

1. Application of Science and Technology for Rural development, established in 1978.
2. Outstanding contribution for the Development and Welfare of Women and Children, established in 1980 in memory of Janaki Devi Bajaj.
3. International Award for promoting Gandhian values outside India, which is given to an individual of foreign nationality, established in 1988 on the birth centenary of Jamnalal Bajaj.

To commemorate the birth centenary of Mr. Jamnalal Bajaj, the Foundation presented a special award to Dr. Nelson Mandela in 1990.

== List of awardees ==
Year	Constructive Work	Science & Technology	Women & Child Welfare	International
1978	Jugatram Dave	Satish Chandra Das Gupta		
1979	Sarla Devi & Murlidhar Devidas Amte (Baba Amte)	Jayant Shamrao Patil		
1980	Gandhi Niketan Ashram	Anil Sadgopal	Jayashri Raiji & Kamalabai Hospet	
1981	Amalprava Das	A. M. M. Murugappa Chettiar	Ramadevi Choudhury	
1982	Gokulbhai Daulatram Bhatt	Prembhai	Taraben Mashruwala	
1983	Tagaduru Ramachandra Rao	Manibhai Desai	Pushpaben Mehta	
1984	Popatlal Ramchandra Shah	Mohan Narhari Parikh	Gaura Devi	
1985	T.S. Avinashilingam	Sanjit Roy	Anutai Wagh	
1986	Sunderlal Bahuguna	Vilas B. Salunke	Vasanti S. Roy	
1987	Natwar Thakkar	Sunit Dhanaji Bonde	Annapragada C. Krishna Rao	
1988	S. Jagannathan and Krishnammal Jagannathan	Ishwarbhai Patel	Malati Devi Choudhuri	Pierre Parodi
1989	K. Janardanan Pillai	T. G. K. Menon	Indirabai Halbe	Danilo Dolci
1990	Tirath Ram	S. A. Dabholkar	Ratan Shastri	A. T. Ariyaratne
1991	Dwarko Sundarani	S. Krishnamurthy Mirmira	Radha Bahin Bhatt	Charles Walker
1992	Thakurdas Bang	K. Vishwanathan	Shalini Moghe	Homer A. Jack
1993	Vichitra Narain Sharma	Dinkarrao G. Pawar	Kantaben and Harivilasben Shah	Johan Galtung
1994	L. N. Gopalaswami	V. S. Aggarwal	Shanti Devi	Gedong Bagus Oka
1995	Kashinath Trivedi	G. Muniratnam	Vimla Bahuguna	Kamala
1996	Manubhai Pancholi	S. S. Kalbag	Indumati Parikh	Adolfo De Obieta
1997	R. K. Patil	S. S. Katagihallimath	Vinoba Niketan	Young Seek Choue
1998	Acharya Ramamurti	Devendra Kumar	Rajammal P. Devadas	Kumari Jharna Dhara Chowdhury
1999	Narayan Desai	Ajoy Kumar Basu	Saraswathi Gora	Joseph Rotblat
2000	Somdutt Vedalankar	Bhaskar Save	Vidya Devi	Desmond Tutu
2001	Sisir Sanyal	Anil K. Rajvanshi	Rehmat Sultan Fazelbhoy	Satish Kumar
2002	Siddharaj Dhadda	Arunkumar Dave	Chitra Naik	George Willoughby
2003	Rabindra Nath Upadhyay	Vinayak Patil	Alice Garg	Dr. Mary E. King
2004	Radhakrishna Bajaj	Prabhakar Shankar Thakur	Sarojini Varadappan	Marie Thoeger
2005	P. Gopinathan Nair	Rajendra Singh	Arunaben Shankarprasad Desai	Daisaku Ikeda
2006	S.N. Subbarao	Anil Prakash Joshi	Rani Abhay Bang	Ismail Serageldin
2007	Yashpal M. Mittal	Anand Dinkar Karve	Ashoka Gupta	Michael Nagler
2008	Biswanath Pattnaik	Tushar Kanjilal	Phoolbasan Yadav	Louis Campana
2009	Lavanam	Ayyappa Masagi	Jaya Arunachalam	Charles Peter Dougherty
2010	Chunibhai Vaidya	Chewang Norphel	Shakuntaladevi Choudhary	Lia Diskin
2011	Ramesh Bhaiya and Vimla Bahan	Anupam Mishra	Shobhana Ranade	Agus Indra Udayana
2012	Jayant Mathkar	Kalyan Paul	Glenn D. Paige	Nighat Shafi
2013	G. V. Subba Rao	Snehlata Nath	Vidhya Das	Jean-Marie Muller
2014	Surendra Koulagi	Ram Kumar Singh	Chennupati Vidaya	Sulak Sivaraksa
2015	Man Singh Rawat	Perumal Vivekanandan	Anna Ferrer	Minoru Kasai
2016	Mohan Hirabai Hiralal	B. V. Nimbkar	Dr. N. Manga Devi	Rached Ghannouchi
2017	Shashi Tyagi	Jan Swasthya Sahyog	Praveen Nair	Ziad Medoukh
2018	Dhoom Singh Negi	Rupal Desai	Prasanna Bhandari	Clayborne Carson
2019	Bhawani Shanker Kusum	Mohammad Imran Khan Mewati	Shaheen Mistri	Sonia Deotto
2020	Cancelled due to corona outbreak			
2021	Dharampal Saini	Lal Singh	Lucy Kurien	David H. Albert
2022	Nilesh Desai	Mansukhbhai Prajapati	Sophia Shaik	Ogarit Younan Walid Slaybi
2023	Regi George and Lalitha Regi	Ramalakshmi Datta	Sudha Varghese	Raha Naba Kumar

== See also ==
- List of awards for contributions to society
