= Acharya Ramamurti =

Indian social activist, gandhian, educationist and academic (1913–2010)

- Born: 22 January 1913; Jaunpur, United Provinces of Agra and Oudh, British India
- Died: 20 May 2010 (aged 97); Patna, Bihar, India
- Occupations: Social activist Gandhian; Educationist
- Known for: Ramamurti Review Committee; Shrambharati
- Awards: Padma Shri; Jamnalal Bajaj Award

Acharya Ramamurti (22 January 1913 – 20 May 2010) was an Indian social activist, gandhian, educationist and academic. He headed the review committee of 1990, popularly known as Ramamurti Review Committee, for evaluating the progress of the National Policy on Education of 1986. He was the director of Shrambharati, a non governmental organization, engaged in community development, adhering to Gandhian ideals. The Government of India awarded him the fourth highest civilian award of the Padma Shri in 1999.

== Biography ==
Ramamurti was born on 22 January 1913 in a small village in Jaunpur district by name, Ardhpur, in the Indian state of Uttar Pradesh in a financially healthy family of farmers. After securing a master's degree (MA) in History from Lucknow University, he started his career, in 1954, as a lecturer at Government Queens College, Varanasi but resigned from the job on 10 May 1954 to pursue an active career in social service and joined Shrambharati, a social service community founded by Dhirendra Mazumdar, a gandhian and Sarvodaya leader. When the Bhoodan movement was launched by Vinoba Bhave in 1951, Ramamurti became associated with it, travelling from village to village, propagating the ideals and collecting land. After the death of Mazumdar, he became the Director of the organization and is credited with transforming it into one of the largest peace movement organizations in the country. Main aspects of Reviewed Policy by Ram Murti Recview committee 1990. In the early Seventies, he started working closely with Jayaprakash Narayan and was involved with the Bihar Andolan. After the success of Total Revolution, he turned his attention to education and organized the Earn and Learn movement in Khadigram and thirty neighboring villages. In 1989, when V. P. Singh became the Prime Minister of India, his involvement with national level politics increased and he was appointed as the chairman of the Review Committee to appraise the implementation of the National Education Policy of 1980, on 7 May 1990. The committee, known as the Ramamurti Review Committee, submitted the report on 9 January 1991 and recommended several changes which included the introduction of a common school system, promotion of women education, Early childhood care and education (ECCE), and Socially Useful Productive Work (SUPW), among others. He received the Jamnalal Bajaj Award in 1998 and the Government of India awarded him the civilian honour of the Padma Shri in 1999. Acharya Ram murti was the chairman of the Revised national Policy committee. Ramamurti was one of the founders of Mahila Shanti Sena (Women's Peace Corps), the women's wing of Shanti Sena, which was established in February 2002, at Vaishali, Bihar, at a conference jointly organized by Shrambharati and McMaster University. Besides writing several articles on Gandhian social and educational ideals, he also delivered several lectures, in India and abroad; the one at McMaster University, Canada, titled Total Culture of Peace, is one among them. The lecture was the 2003 edition of the series, Mahatma Gandhi Lecture on Nonviolence. Towards the fag end of his life, he was involved with the functioning of Mahila Shanti Sena but also held positions such as that of the director of the Institute for Gandhian Studies, Patna, and as the President of the Servseva Sangh. He died on 20 May 2010, in Patna, Bihar, at the age of 97.

== See also ==
- National Policy on Education
- Bhoodan movement
- Shanti Sena
- Jayaprakash Narayan
