= Snehalata =

Snehalata or Snehlata may refer to

== People ==
- Snehlata Shrivastava, Secretary General of the Lok Sabha
- Snehlata Nath, Indian activist
- Snehlata Deshmukh, Former Vice Chancellor of the University of Mumbai
- Snehalata Reddy, Indian film actress
- Snehalata Kolhe, Indian politician
- Snehalata V. Huzurbazar, American statistician

== Film ==
- Snehlata, 1936 Hindi/Gujarati Indian film directed by Balwant Bhatt
