= Shanti Devi (social worker) =

Indian social worker (1934–2022)

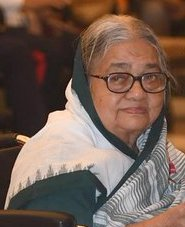
- Devi in November 2021
- Born: 18 April 1934; Balasore district
- Died: 16 January 2022 (aged 87); Rayagada, Odisha
- Occupation: Social worker
- Known for: Social activism
- Spouse: Ratan Das
- Awards: Padma Shri; Radhanath Rath Peace Award; Jamnalal Bajaj Award

Shanti Devi (18 April 1934 – 16 January 2022) was an Indian social worker born in 1934 in Balasore district of Indian state of Odisha. She was awarded the Padma Shri award on 9 November 2021 by the President, Ram Nath Kovind at the Civil Investiture Ceremony-IV, at Rashtrapati Bhavan for her social works and efforts to bring peace in the Maoist-affected Rayagada region of Odisha. Devi received the Radhanath Rath Peace Award and was awarded the Jamnalal Bajaj Award in 1994.

== Early life and education ==
Devi was born in a landlord family in Balasore district on 18 April 1934. She attended the college for two years and at the age of 17, she was married to Ratan Das, a doctor and follower of Gandhian ideology.

== Social work ==
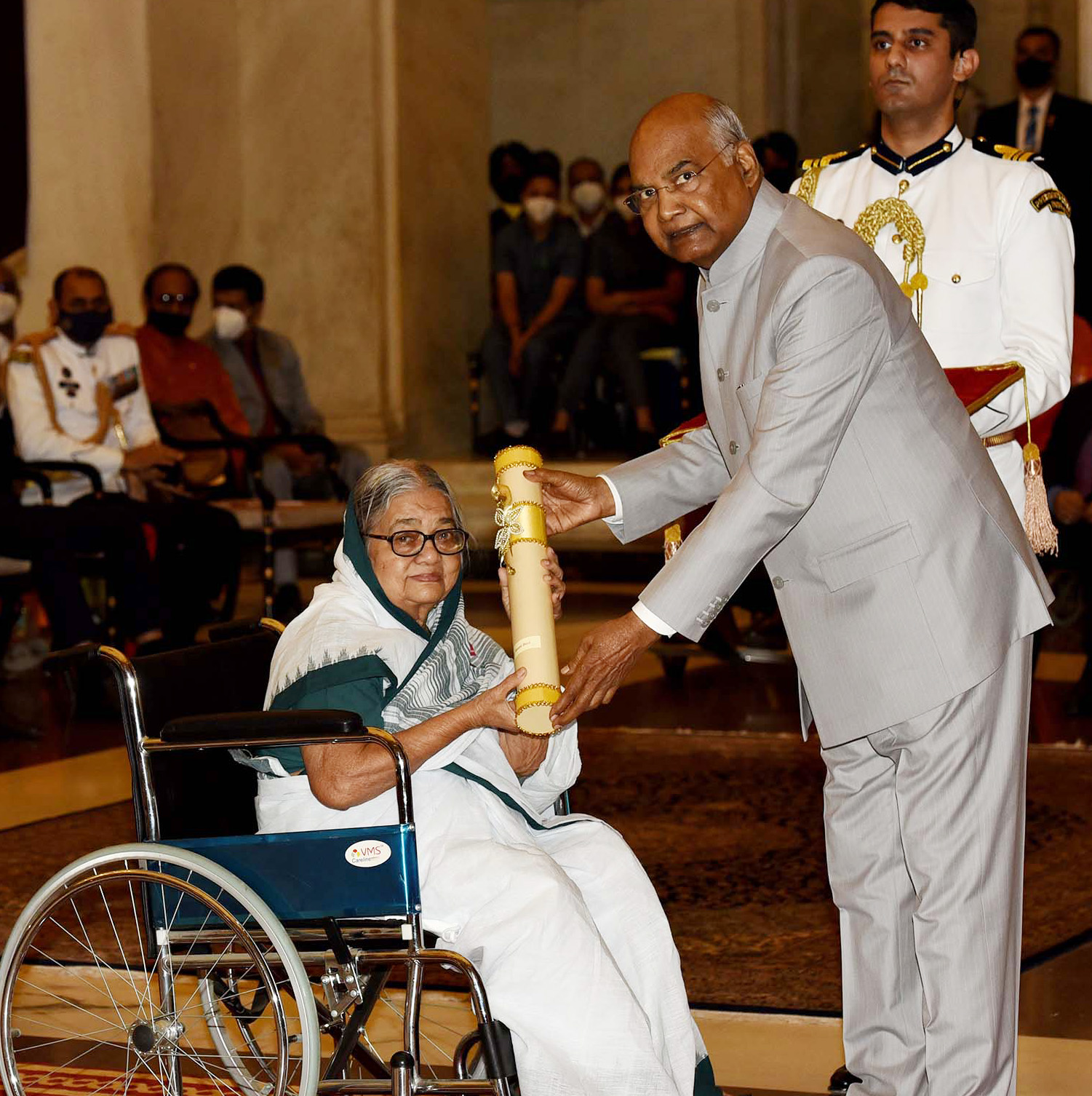
President Ram Nath Kovind presenting the Padma Shri Award to Shanti Devi.

Devi was inspired by the ideology of the pacifist Vinobha Bhave. She took part in Bhave's Bhoodan Movement. She began social work at the early age. Devi worked for the education and the betterment of tribal girls and destitute women. She established an ashram at Gobarapalli in Rayagada district and Seva Samaj at Gunupur in Odisha in 1964. She also set up an ashram for leprosy patients in Jabarguda in the Rayagada district. She is known for her efforts to establish peace in the Maoist-affected districts of Odisha and for her work in Sankhalapadar village where the disease of Yaws was endemic. Devi was able to treat over 4,000 people who had the disease, possibly with the help of nine other people, which can lead to disfigurement and disability. Due to her efforts, the disease was eradicated from the village.

== Personal life ==
Devi was born on 18 April 1934 in the Balasore district of Odisha. At the age of 17, she was married to Ratan Das who was a doctor. After the marriage, they moved to Koraput district. She died on 16 January 2022 at Rayagada district hospital. She was 87. She is survived by her son Sidharth Das.
