= Ramamurti =

Ramamurti is a name. People with the name include:

- Ramamurti Shankar, American physicist
- Ramamurti Rajaraman (1939–2025), Indian scientist and academic
- Acharya Ramamurti (1913–2010), Indian social activist, gandhian, educationist and academic
- Bharat Ramamurti, American political advisor
