= Basanti Devi (environmentalist) =

Indian environmentalist

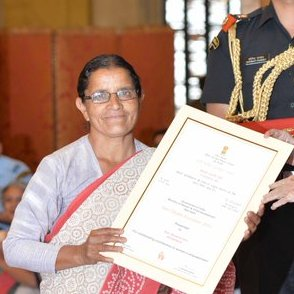
- Basanti Devi with award in 2016
- Born: 1958; Uttarakhand, India
- Education: Lakshmi Ashram
- Occupation: Environmentalist
- Known for: Leading women to save trees and revitalizing watersheds in Uttarakhand
- Spouse: Died when she was a teenager
- Awards: Nari Shakti Puraskar (2016); * Padma Shri (2022)

Basanti Devi (born 1958) is an Indian environmentalist known for her efforts in preserving trees and revitalizing watersheds in Uttarakhand. She was honored with the Nari Shakti Puraskar, the highest civilian award for women in India, in 2016, and the Padma Shri in 2022 for her contributions to social work and environmental conservation.

== Early life ==
Devi was born in 1958 in Uttarakhand, India. She spent her adolescence near Kausani at the Lakshmi Ashram, a Gandhian institution for young girls founded by Sarla Behn. She arrived at the ashram in 1980 after becoming a widow at a young age; she had been married at twelve and lost her husband as a teenager. Although she had attended school before her marriage and was barely literate, she continued her education at the ashram, reaching the 12th standard. There, she developed an interest in teaching. Despite the low wages, her father supported her work.

== Environmental work ==
Devi became a prominent environmentalist, focusing on the conservation of forests in Uttarakhand. One of her key concerns was the Kosi River, a vital resource in Uttarakhand that also influences flooding in Bihar, affecting vast areas of land and millions of people. After reading an article predicting the river’s demise within a decade due to deforestation, she mobilized local women, emphasizing that the forest and river were their heritage and urging them to consider the consequences of its loss.

Devi negotiated with villagers and timber companies, securing an agreement to halt the cutting of new trees. Villagers committed to using only old wood for fuel. She organized community groups to foster conservation efforts, including volunteering to combat forest fires. Over time, these efforts bore fruit: springs that once dried up in summer now flow year-round, and the forest has become more diverse, with species like oak, rhododendron, and Myrica esculenta thriving.

== Awards and recognition ==
In March 2016, Devi traveled to New Delhi to receive the Nari Shakti Puraskar, India’s highest award for women, from President Pranab Mukherjee. In 2022, she was conferred the Padma Shri, recognizing her lifelong dedication to environmental conservation and social work.
