= Gutha Muniratnam =

Indian social worker (1936–2021)

G. Muniratnam
- Born: 6 January 1936; Seethapuram, Tiruvalur, Andhra Pradesh, India
- Died: 6 May 2021 (aged 85)
- Occupation: Social worker
- Years active: since 1981
- Parent(s): Rangaiah Naidu; Mangamma
- Awards: Padma Shri; Rajiv Gandhi Manav Seva Award; 75th Avatar Mahotsava Award; Dr. Paidi Lakshmaiah Memorial Award; ICSW Best Welfare Worker Award; Jamnalal Bajaj Award; Gem of India Award; Priyadarshini Indira Gandhi Award; Shiromani Award; Indira Gandhi National Award; GOI National Award; Balabhandu Award; Rotary Award; FICCI Award; Jamnalal Bajaj Endowment Award

Gutta Muniratnam (6 January 1936 – 6 May 2021) was an Indian social worker, a member of the National Planning Commission of India and the founder of Rashtriya Seva Samithi (RASS), a non governmental organization engaged in the social welfare activities in over 2500 socio-economically backward villages in the Rayalaseema region, spread across the present day states of Andhra Pradesh and Telangana. He was honored by the Government of India, in 2012, with the fourth highest Indian civilian award of Padma Shri.

== Biography ==
Muniratnam Nayudu was born on 6 January 1936, at the remote hamlet of Seethapuram in Tiruvalur of the undivided Andhra Pradesh, India, to Rangaiah Naidu and Mangamma. He did his schooling in Tirutani and during that period, he came under the influence of the renowned Gandhians, N. G. Ranga and Nirmala Deshpande. He started his social involvement by organizing a few children's clubs called Balananda Sangham when he was 15. Later, he joined the Bharat Sevak Samaj, and got associated with their youth welfare programs during the period 1960–1966. In 1970, Muniratnam moved to Tirupati where he had the opportunity to meet the social activist, Rajgopal Naidu. The association paved the way for the organization, Rayalaseema Seva Samithi, in 1981, which was later renamed as Rashtriya Seva Samithi (RASS).

Muniratnam, a recipient of DLitt (Honoris Causa) from Sri Venkateswara University, lived in Tirupati where RASS has its headquarters.

Muniratnam died from COVID-19 on 6 May 2021, during the COVID-19 pandemic in India. He was 85 years old.

== Rashtriya Seva Samithi and social career ==
Rashtriya Seva Samithi, erstwhile Rayalaseema Seva Samithi, has hosted the social activities of Muniratnam, ever since he founded the organization, with assistance from Rajgopal Naidu, in 1981. One of the first attempts was to make modern scientific applications available to the poor farmers of the drought prone Rayalaseema region and he succeeded in establishing a Krishi Vigyan Kendra under the umbrella of the Indian Council of Agricultural Research. Later, his activities focussed on women and child welfare for which several Mahila Mandals were established. He is known to have initiated several agro-forestry and horticultural programs by supplying saplings free of cost. The nursery, set up by RASS is reported to have supplied over six hundred thousand saplings and grafts to the farmers. The organization has developed a 75-acre farm, received as a grant from the Government of Andhra Pradesh, where modern agricultural methods are being implemented. They have also supplied smokeless chulhas (kitchen stoves) and have a running program to train the women in using the stoves.

Another area of focus of the organization is in employment generation for which they have established several small scale manufacturing units in garments, assembly of electronic products, toys and foodstuffs. The units provide training and job opportunities to people and help them set up their own units after successful completion of training by providing financial assistance. They claim the scheme has benefitted over 2000 women. They are also involved in sanitation programs under which 750 low cost comfort stations have been constructed. The program also incorporates waste water disposal by channelising it for irrigation purposes. Awareness campaigns on community health, family planning services, personal hygiene and environmental sanitation are also regularly conducted and a nurses training centre is also in operation, since 1986, under the management of the organization. They have also set up many maternity care centres in and around Chittoor district.

Under the guidance of Muniratnam, the organization is reported to have established 600 early education centres, benefitting 30,000 children of the region. The organization is known to have set up 1100 basic education centres in Chittoor and Cudappah districts to provide non formal education to 32,000 children of which 166 centres are exclusively for girls and another 227 centres open to backward communities.

Rashtriya Seva Samithi has a reported presence in 2500 villages spread in four districts in the Rayalaseema region. In order to broaden the reach of his activities, Muniratnam has already set up a nationwide organization, Sahaya Samithi, widening the scope of activities to include the rehabilitation of physically and mentally challenged children incorporating assistance for destitute women. Muniratnam attended conferences and seminars to deliver keynote addresses and wrote articles to propagate his views.

== Positions ==
Muniratnam, a former member of the National Planning Commission of India, has served on many government constituted committees and agencies. At the central government level, he has been a member of Sakshara Bharat, (Ministry of Human Resource Development), Regional Committee of the Council for Advance of People's Action and Rural Technology CAPART, (Ministry of Rural Development), National Consultative Committee on De-addiction and Rehabilitation (NCCDR), (Ministry of Social Justice), the Governing Board of Rashtriya Mahila Kosh (RMK), the Executive Committee of the Central Social Welfare Board and the National Literacy Mission Authority, (Ministry of Human Resource Development). He has held the chairs of the State Resource Center and Jan Sikshan Sansthan, two of the Ministry of Human Resource Development initiatives.

At the State administration level, Muniratnam has held the chair of Orissa Tribal Development Project and has been a member of the GO-NGO Coordination Committee and the Advisory Council of the Vigilance Commission of the Government of Andhra Pradesh. He was the president of Akhil Bharat Rachanatmak Samaj, New Delhi, vice president of the All India Harijan Sevak Sangh Delhi, and the convenor of the National Forum of Krishi Vigyan Kendras (NGO sector). He was the Chairperson of Krishi Vigyan Kendra of the Indian Council of Agricultural Research housed at Acharya N. G. Ranga Agricultural University and Balaji Bala Vikas. He was also a life member of Bharatiya Vidya Bhavan, Mumbai, Indian Red Cross Society, Andhra Pradesh, Youth Hostels of India, New Delhi and the Indian Institute of Public Administration (IIPA), Delhi.

== Awards and recognitions ==
Three years after the establishment of Rashtriya Seva Samithi, in 1984–1985, Muniratnam received the National award for his contributions to Child welfare. In 1987, Indian Merchants Chamber awarded him the Jamnalal Bajaj Endowment Award and another award came his way in 1989, the Indira Gandhi Unity Award from the National Integration Council, New Delhi. This was followed by the Shiromani Award (1991), Gem of India Award (1992) from All India Achiever's Association, Priyadarshini Indira Gandhi Award (1992) from the International Institute of Peace and Friendship Society, Balabhandu Award (1995) from the Government of Andhra Pradesh and Dr. Paidi Lakshmaiah Memorial Award, (1998) from the Government of India.

Jamnalal Bajaj Foundation conferred their annual Jamnalal Bajaj Award on Muniratnam in 1995. The next year, he received the award from the Indian Council of Social Welfare, Hyderabad, and a year later, the FICCI award. He has also received Rotary India Award (2004), Rajiv Gandhi Manav Seva Award, (2006) from the Ministry of Women and Child Development and 75th Avatar Mahotsava Award (2010) from Kanchi Kamakoti Peetham. In 2012, the Government of India awarded him the fourth highest civilian honor of Padma Shri.

== See also ==
- N. G. Ranga
- Nirmala Deshpande
- Harijan Sevak Sangh
- National Literacy Mission
