= Sudha Varghese =

Indian nun and social worker

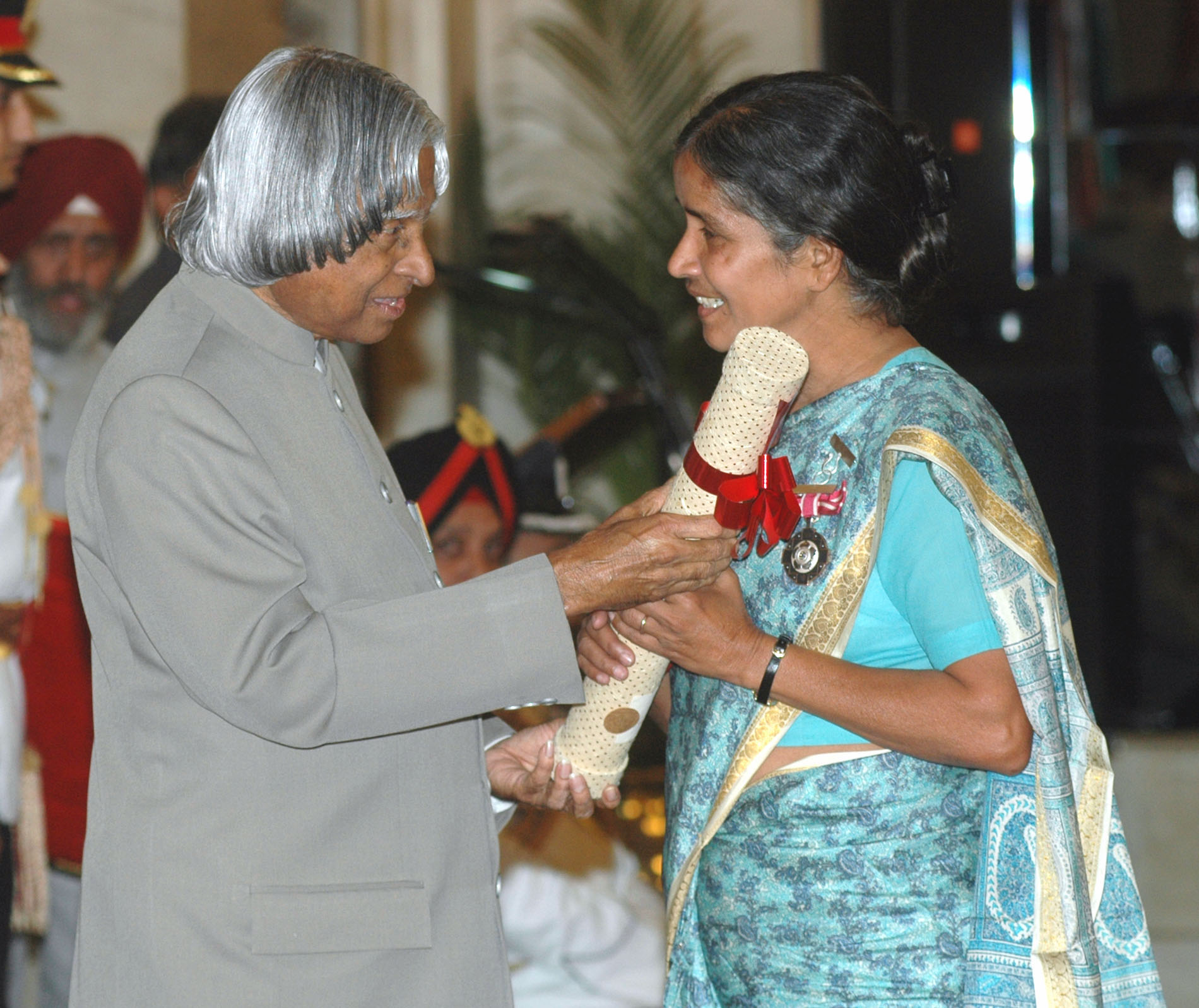
- Sister Sudha Varghese receiving Padma Shri from President Abdul Kalam in 2006
- Born: 5 September 1949 (age 77); Kottayam district, Kerala, India
- Occupation: social worker
- Known for: Nari Gunjan schools, Prerna schools

Sudha Varghese, also known as Sister Sudha, is a former religious sister and social worker in India who has devoted herself to the Musahar, the Dalit of Bihar and Uttar Pradesh, one of the Scheduled Castes and who are considered the "untouchables". She resides and works in Jamsaut, a village in Patna district. She is sometimes called didi, which means "elder sister".

She is the chief executive officer of Nari Gunjan ("woman's voice"), a not-for-profit organisation that provides education, literacy, vocational training, healthcare, advocacy and life skills for Dalit girls and women in Bihar. Nari Gunjan has 50 facilities with an overall enrolment of 1500 girls.

Varghese has stated that she draws inspiration from B. R. Ambedkar, a Dalit who fought against the concept of untouchability and was one of the drafters of the Constitution of India.

== Early life ==
Varghese was born to a prosperous family in the Kottayam district of Kerala on 5 September 1949. In 1965, she moved to Bihar to work for the poor with the Sisters of Notre Dame de Namur at their Academy. She trained there for a few years, during which she learned English and Hindi. She resigned from her job as a teacher in the convent, and in 1986 moved into a complex of mud and brick houses (tola) used by the lowest castes in India, to educate the Musahar.

From that time, she built schools and a home, and in 1989 obtained a law degree from a school in Bangalore to "fight cases for women who have faced abuse", particularly cases of rape, sexual harassment, and violence against women. She was also in a demonstration supporting the victim of the 2012 Delhi gang rape case.

In her home, she convened a group of teenage girls, to whom she taught reading, writing, sewing, and embroidery. Two years later, she opened five centres to teach girls "vocational training in nutrition, sanitation, and money management", the first of the Nari Gunjan facilities for Musahar girls. These centres also teach nursing and preliminary medical assistance, and other skills that are economically valuable. She had obtained funding from her parents, siblings, and the community. A UNICEF grant of a few thousand dollars allowed expansion to 50 centres.

She resided within the tola for 21 years. She returned briefly to the convent after being threatened by the parents of the perpetrators of an attack against Musahar boys; the victims had filed a police report, in part because of her teaching the Musahar about their rights.

== Prerna schools ==
All their lives, they are told, 'You are the last. You are the least. You do not deserve to have.' They learn very fast to keep quiet, don't expect changes and don't ask for more.

— Sudha Varghese,

In 2005 she moved to Patna, where she established a residential school named Prerna, a Hindi word meaning inspiration. It was in a building described as "half public latrine and half water-buffalo shed" in Lal Kothi, on the outskirts of Danapur. Restoration of the facility was made possible with government funding and volunteer donations and help. It opened in 2006.

It is an all-girls school designed to remove girls from farm labour to ensure they receive an education. Varghese also teaches about the fundamental rights guaranteed to them by the constitution. The Prerna Residential School for Mahadalit Girls has an enrolment of 125 girls. There, girls are well fed and bathe daily.

The intention was to teach the girls basic skills, and deliver their formal education at a nearby school. However, the teachers rarely showed at the school, and the children learned little in the first semester. Because of this, she raised funds to send a dozen of the girls to a nearby private school, $200 for each student. For the others, she cleared some space in the residential school, and hired a few unemployed university graduates to teach the girls.

After Nitish Kumar was elected Chief Minister of Bihar, he asked Varghese if she could replicate the success of her school. She stated that she would try, and he allocated resources for her to open a school named Prerna 2 at a site in Gaya that she had chosen. Despite construction and bureaucratic delays, the school eventually opened, and is now partially funded by Mahadalit Mission, a program operated by the Government of Bihar.

Each of the Prerna schools is non-denominational, and includes calisthenics and art programs. The girls return home for public holidays, such as Dussehra, some of whom never return because their parents want to marry them before they become too old, despite legislation that outlaws such practices. Because of the long waiting list of girls to attend Prerna schools, the spots of the girls who do not return are filled quickly.

In addition to the standard curriculum, Prerna also teaches arts and dance, and hired a karate teacher. Varghese felt that karate would give the girls "more self-confidence, and also self-protection". The girls of Prerna Chhatravas became so proficient that they won five gold, five silver and 14 bronze medals at a competition in Gujarat in 2011, earning a trip to the Asian Junior Karate Championships in Japan, where they won seven trophies.

== Awards ==
In 2006, Varghese was the recipient of the Padma Shri, a civilian honour awarded by the Government of India. In 2023, she was awarded with Jamnalal Bajaj Award, Sudha has been selected for rendering social service upholding Gandhian values.

== See also ==
- Caste politics in India
- Padma Shri Awards (2000–2009)

== Notes ==
=== References ===
- "Reception to Padma Shri Sr. Sudha Varghese on Sunday 26th Nov. 2006". Indian Catholic Community of Vienna.
- "Projects". Shoshit Seva Sangh.
- Jah, Giridhar (7 September 2011). "Nitish gives eight Mahadalit girls chance of lifetime".
- Nolen, Stephanie (3 December 2011). "Remarkable school gives girls from the bottom of India's caste system new hope". The Globe and Mail.
- Nolen, Stephanie (10 December 2011). "You can unlock the potential of India's most oppressed girls, but where are they going to use it?". The Globe and Mail.
- Nolen, Stephanie (8 June 2012). "What's better than a miracle school for 'untouchable' girls?". The Globe and Mail.
- Nolen, Stephanie. "Why illegal child marriage persists among the Dalits in India". The Globe and Mail.
- Patna, Amitabh Srivastava (18 November 2008). "Marginalised girls find hope in Sudha". India Today. Living Media.
- Srivastava, Anupam (6 February 2006). "Reaching out to India's poorest: Sister Sudha awarded government distinction". UNICEF.
- "Lawyers for prompt justice delivery system". The Times of India. 21 December 2012.
