= Thakurdas Bang =

Thakurdas Bang (1917 – 27 January 2013) was an Indian Gandhian philosopher and Gandhian economist. He was involved in the Indian independence movement. He practised Gandhism, Gandhian philosophy, Gandhian study even at the age of 95. He was also involved in Khadi and Sarvodaya movements. As an economic professor in G S College of Commerce he motivated many students like Madhukarrao Chaudhari, Justice Chandrashekhar Shankar Dharmadhikari and Ramakrushna Bajaj to participate in the freedom struggle. He is succeeded by Abhay Bang and Ashok Bang. Ashok Bang decided to work for issues related to farming and Abhay decided to work for health of villagers. Abhay and Rani Bang founded SEARCH (the Society For Education, Action and Research In Community Health), a non-profit organization in Gadchiroli, which is involved in rural health service and research

== Early life ==
Thakurdas Bang was born at Ganori village in Amaravati District in Maharashtra went on to become an economics professor in a college started by one of Mahatma Gandhi's associates. He lived in Wardha district, a town few miles away from Gandhi's ashram in Sevagram. He participated in the Quit India Movement in 1942 and was imprisoned for two years. During his role as a professor he conducted many lectures and organised camps to steer students to fight for freedom. He considered this as his greatest opportunity to prepare the students to fight against British Government in India.

== Meeting with Gandhi ==
On deciding to pursue his career as economist in the US, Bang wanted to seek blessings from Mahatma Gandhi. On conveying the reason for his visit to ashram, Gandhi uttered only one sentence "If you want to study economics, don't go to the US; go to the villages of India." This meeting with Gandhi changed his life completely and he started working along with his students in villages studying economics of farmers by living like them.

== Social and political life ==
After deciding to stay in India to study on village economics, he was involved in movements such as Bhoodan-land donation to landless, Gramdan-village commune movements. Being a follower of Jayaprakash Narayan he joined him in Sarvodaya movement along with other prominent leaders across the country. He was also in support with Narayan to offer a non-violent resistance in Sino-Indian War in 1962.

== Awards ==
- Bang was the recipient of Jamnalal Bajaj Award in 1992 under the category of constructive work. He received the award from the tenth President of India K R Narayanan.
- He was selected for the 2012 Nag Bhushan.
- He was honoured with the Maharashtra Foundation Lifetime Achievement Award For Social Work in January 2013.
