= Tagadur Ramachandra Rao =

Indian activist (1898–1989)

Tagaduru Ramachandra Rao (1898 – c. 1989) was a veteran freedom fighter and social activist from Karnataka (erstwhile Mysore state), noted as the founder of Swarajya Mandir and Satyagraha Ashram at Tagadur village in Mysore district in 1921.

== Biography ==
Ramachandra Rao was born in a Halenadu Karnataka Brahmin family in a place called Tagaduru which is in Nanjangud Taluk of Mysore district. His ancestors were very affluent zamindars, but by the time Ramachandra Rao became a young boy, the family property was reduced considerably.

Ramachandra Rao was a follower of Mahatma Gandhi, deeply influenced by Satyagraha movement. He was called "Father of Political Unrest" in princely Mysore. Ramachandra Rao was arrested for opposing the visit of the Simon Commission to India in 1928 and became the first political prisoner in Mysore State. He was popularly known as Mysore Gandhi.

Ramachandra Rao founded the Khaddar Sahakara Sangha in 1925. Because of his influence and efforts Mahatma Gandhi made his visit to Mysore State in 1932 while, he visited Tagadur and a village nearby-Badanavalu village in Nanjangud Taluk of Mysore district.

Apart from freedom movement, Ramachandra Rao took part in other social and national movements. Some of the movements initiated by him are as follows.

- Cow protection movement in Mysore state
- Anti untouchability movement - made many temples to open their doors to Dalits
- Anti conversion drive in Mysore state against the conversion by missionaries.
- Instrumental in admitting many lower caste people into schools

Ramachandra Rao has written many articles and books. His autobiography "Nanna alilu seve" gives an account of journey of his life. Although he could have become minister in the Mysore state after the freedom of India he was not attracted by power. He opted for a quiet life with his children and grand children. He lived in Mysore till his death. There is a circle in Vidyaranyapuram in Mysore which is named after him.

In 1983Ramachandra Rao was conferred with the Jamnalal Bajaj Award for Application of Science and Technology for Rural Development. GV Iyer made documentary on Tagaduru Ramachandra Rao during 1980's along with the family members.
