= Tushar Kanjilal =

Indian politician (1935–2020)

- Born: 1 March 1935; Noakhali, British India
- Died: 29 January 2020 (aged 84); Kolkata, India
- Occupation: Social worker
- Spouse: Bina Kanjilal
- Children: Three children
- Parent: Dwigendralal Kanjilal
- Awards: Padma Shri

Tushar Kanjilal (1 March 1935 – 29 January 2020) was an Indian social worker, political activist, environmentalist, writer and headmaster of Rangabelia High School. He was the founder of a non governmental organization, which merged with the Tagore Society for Rural Development, a social organization working for the upliftment of the rural people in Sunderbans region, in the Indian state of West Bengal.

== Early life ==
Born to Dwigendralal Kanjilal in Noakhali, in the present day Bangladesh, Kanjilal's family migrated to West Bengal before the Indian independence. He was attracted to Marxist ideologies from a young age and had a frequently disrupted education due to his activism. After his marriage to Bina, he settled in Rangabelia, a small hamlet in the Sunderbans region, where he stayed with his family of three children, Tanima, Tania and Tanmoy, and worked as the headmaster of the local high school. There, he started his social service, founding an organization, which was later merged with the Tagore Society for Rural Development. He was also involved in environmental activism and wrote a book, Who Killed the Sunderbans?, which deals with the issue of the destruction of the mangrove forests of Sunderbans.

The Government of India awarded him the fourth highest civilian honour of Padma Shri in 1986. He received the Jamnalal Bajaj Award in 2008. Kanjilal was in the process of founding an institute, Interpretation Complex, which is aimed at dealing with the problems of the Sunderbans region. He resided in Kolkata, West Bengal.

== See also ==
- Sunderbans
