= Agus Indra Udayana =

Social worker

Agus Indra Udayana is a social worker from Indonesia. In 2020, he was conferred with the Padma Shri honour by the Government of India for his contributions to the field of social work, particularly for spreading Gandhian values. Udayana has four ashrams in Bali and Lombok that follow the Gandhian principles of non-violence, humanity, and truth. He works with the Indian Council for Cultural Relations to impart and share cultural associations and build dialogue.

== Awards ==
- Padma Shri (2020)
- Jamnalal Bajaj International Award (2011)
- Pemuda Pariwisata Harapan Award (1999)
- Remaja Dewata Award (1990)
