= Ganiyari =

Village in Bilaspur (Chhattisgarh), India

Ganiyari, also spelt Ganiari, is a village located in the Bilaspur district of the Indian state of Chhattisgarh.

A 62-bed hospital run by Jan Swasthya Sahyog is located here, which serves the surrounding villages.

== Landmarks ==
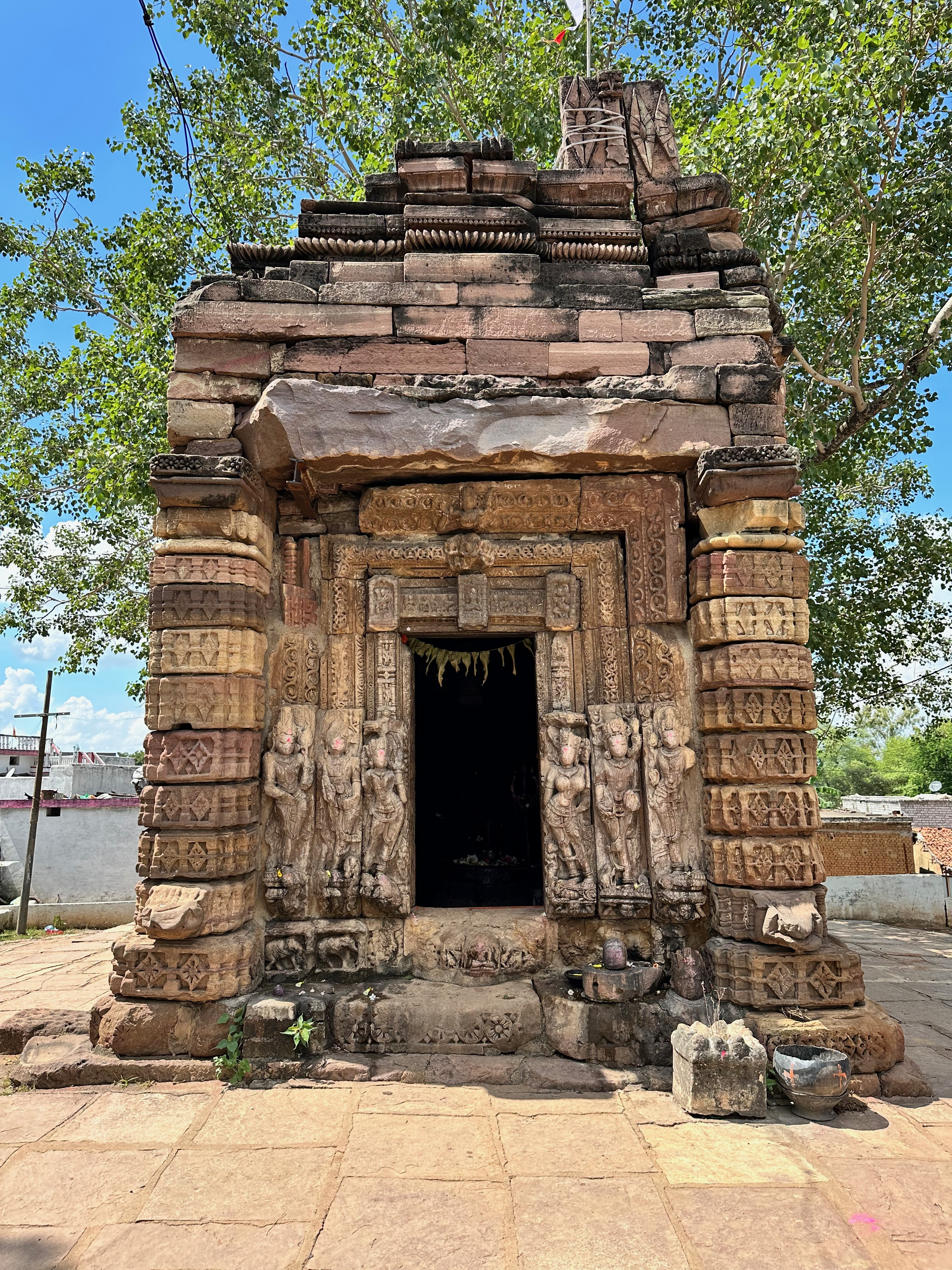
Shiva temple, Ganiyari

A Kalachuri-era Shiva temple is located here. The temple faces east. The doorway has three jambs.

== Demographics ==
The village has a population of 4958, in 962 households.
