= Jharna Dhara Chowdhury =

Bangladeshi social activist (1938–2019)

- ঝর্ণা ধারা চৌধুরী
- Born: 15 October 1938; Lakshmipur District, Bengal Presidency, British India
- Died: 27 June 2019 (aged 80); Dhaka, Bangladesh
- Occupation: Social activist
- Awards: Ekushey Padak (2015); Padma Shri (2013)

Jharna Dhara Chowdhury (15 October 1938 – 27 June 2019) was a Bangladeshi social activist.

== Early life ==
Chowdhury was born on 15 October 1938 in Lakshmipur District, Bengal Presidency, British India. Her parents were Promoth Chowdhury and Ashalata Chowdhury. Her home was burned during the Noakhali riots and she fled with her family to Assam. She returned after the riots ended and was inspired by the works of Mahatma Gandhi who had come to the region on a peace mission after the riots.

== Career ==
During the Bangladesh Liberation war in 1971, Chowdhury helped around 500 girls flee the violence to India.

In 1990 Chowdhury took charge of the Gandhi Ashram Trust in Jayag Village, Chatkhil Upazila, Noakhali District.

Chowdhury was the secretary of the Gandhi Ashram Trust in Noakhali District.

In 2013, Chowdhury was awarded the Padma Shri, the fourth highest civilian award in India.

Chowdhury was awarded the Ekushey Padak, the second highest civilian award, for her contribution to social services in Bangladesh.

In 2016, Chowdhury oversaw the creation of the Gandhi Memorial School in the Gandhi Ashram Trust campus and which was financed by the Gandhi Heritage Sites Mission, an organ of the Indian Ministry of Culture.

== Death ==
Chowdhury died on 27 June 2019 in Dhaka, Bangladesh. She was being treated at Square Hospital after suffering brain hemorrhage on 1 June 2019. Her last rites took place at the Dhakeshwari Temple in Dhaka. It was kept at the Central Shaheed Minar the next day so people could pay their respects.

== Awards ==
- Gandhi Seva Puraskar (2010)
- Padma Shri, India's fourth highest civilian award (2013)
- Ekushey Padak for social service (2015)
- Jamnalal Bajaj Award (1998)
