= Amalprava Das =

Indian social worker and founder of Kasturba Ashramam (1911–1994)

- Born: 12 November 1911; Dibrugarh, Assam, India
- Died: 20 December 1994 (aged 83); Guwahati, Assam
- Occupation: Social Worker
- Known for: Social Service
- Awards: Padma Shri (1954); Jamnalal Bajaj Award (1981)

Amalprava Das, also known as Amal Prabha Das, (1911–1994) was an Indian social worker, Gandhian and the founder of Kasturba Ashram at Sarania Hills, Assam, a self help group for women and their economic upliftment and Guwahati Yubak Sevadal, a non governmental organization working for the social development of harijans. The Government of India honoured her in 1954, with the award of Padma Shri, the fourth highest Indian civilian award for her contributions to the society, placing her among the first recipients of the award. A recipient of the 1981 Jamnalal Bajaj Award, Das was honoured again by the Government of India with the second highest civilian award of Padma Vibhushan which she declined to accept.

== Early life and work ==
Amalprava was born on 12 November 1911 in a rich family to noted Gandhian couple, Hare Krishna Das and Hema Prabha Das in Dibrugarh in the Northeast Indian state of Assam. She did her schooling at local educational institutions, but was denied admission at the local Cotton College and had to move to Bethune College in Calcutta for college studies from where she passed the school leaving (or university entrance) examination in 1929. Later she joined the Scottish Church College and earned a bachelor's degree (BSc) in chemistry and a master's degree (MSc) in applied chemistry, and in so doing, became the first Assamese woman to obtain a master's degree in science. She continued her studies to gain a diploma in clinical pathology and refused a teaching job at the British run Cotton College citing patriotic reasons.

In 1934 Das had an opportunity to interact with Mahatma Gandhi when the leader of the Indian freedom movement stayed at her house during a visit to Guwahati. This meeting is reported to have influenced her and guided her in her future endeavors. She established Sarania Ashram (later renamed as Kasturba Ashram) in a property owned by her father in Sarania Hills which was later donated to Kasturba Memorial Trust. Under the aegis of the ashram, she organized training for the womenfolk of the village in cottage industries so that they might become financially self-reliant. She also founded several institutions such as Gram Sevika Vidyalaya, Kasturba Kalyan Kendra, Gauhati Katai Mandal, Guwahati Yubak Sevadal and Assam Go-Seva Samiti.

== Honours and awards ==
When the Government of India introduced the Padma Awards in 1954, she was included for the award of Padma Shri. She received the Jamnalal Bajaj Award in 1981 for "Outstanding Contribution in Constructive Work". The Government of India selected her later for the second highest civilian award of Padma Vibhushan, but she declined the award due to apathy towards public honours. Her life and times have been recorded in the book, A Biography, published in 1986, after her demise.

The Department of Social Welfare of the Government of Assam has instituted an award in her honour, Amal Prava Das Award which is being awarded for commitment and excellence in social service since 2013. The department is in the process of making a documentary depicting the life of Amalprava Das.

== See also ==
- Kasturba Gandhi
- Shakuntala Choudhary
