= Jan Swasthya Sahyog =

Non-governmental organization in India

- Website: https://www.jssbilaspur.org/

Jan Swasthya Sahyog is a non-governmental organization focused on healthcare based in the Indian state of Chhattisgarh. It operates a hospital and some health centers in the states of Chhattisgarh and Madhya Pradesh, which provide low-cost treatment. It also runs daycare centers, and provides rudimentary health products to the local communities. The organization received the Jamnalal Bajaj Award in 2017.

== History ==
It was established in 1996, by a group of eight doctors from AIIMS New Delhi. They converted an abandoned building in the village of Ganiyari into a clinic.

== Facilities ==
The organization runs a hospital at Ganiyari, which is a 62-bed facility and includes an operation theatre, a laboratory and a pharmacy. Apart from the full-time staff, volunteers from AIIMS New Delhi also work at the hospital. It provides low cost treatment, and draws patients from all across the Bilaspur district as well as surrounding districts. Apart from the main hospital, it operates sub-centers at the villages of Shivtarai, Semaria and Bamhni. The sub-centers service about 150 small villages in the surrounding areas, mostly inhabited by Gond and Baiga people.

It also runs phulwaris (daycare centers) across rural Chhattisgarh. As of 2024, 83 phulwaris are operated by the organization. These admit children of up to six years of age, and serve as an alternative to anganwadis, which only admit children of up to three years. The phulwaris were instituted after several deaths of unsupervised children due to drowning or other accidents were reported. Furthermore, the children also receive a meal each day in these centers, which is crucial since malnutrition is rife in the region.

The organization designs and provides rudimentary healthcare products for the local communities, such as a village first aid kit, which includes bamboo splints to treat fractures. It also trains village health workers, many of them semi-literate or even illiterate, in basic tasks such as the measurement of blood pressure, taking sputum samples, et cetera.
