= Alice Garg =

Educator and activist

Alice Garg (born 1942) is an educator and activist. She is the founder secretary of the Bal Rashmi Society, a non-profit NGO. She established the Alice Garg National Seashells Museum in Jaipur. She also campaigns for the abolition of Sati (practice) and female foeticide. In 1997 she won the Special Social Lifetime Achievement Award under the Godfrey Phillips Bravery National Awards.

== Bal Rashmi Society ==
Alice started the Bal Rashmi Society after resigning from her teaching job on 14 November 1972 with Rs. 4000. The Society was concerned with "Relief, Welfare and Development of children, women and family at large who are poor, neglected, deprived and downtrodden and living in difficult circumstances and community development".

The society presently houses 183 destitute and underprivileged children from oppressed castes and has over 1640 children enrolled in its schools. The society has a presence in over 138 villages. It runs a large number of government programs in the slums of Jaipur and other villages, funded by both the Government of Rajasthan and the Government of India.

=== In the news ===
Alice campaigned against those involved in the alleged rape of a woman by 15 people including the then Deputy Superintendent of Police at the J.C. Bose hospital in Jaipur in 1997. The campaign criticised the state government and raised its voice against the failure of the police to arrest the suspects.

Three of the society's members, Abdul Sattar, Sita Ram and Satya Narain were arrested and, according to NHRC reports, subjected to mistreatment in prison. Alice went into hiding in order to avoid arrest.

The Society was accused of rape, murder and embezzlement but was subsequently cleared of all charges. In Mrs. Garg's words, "We were booked for four rape cases, one murder and one threat and three misuse of funds. Fifteen of us were booked, and I was booked in all the nine cases. But I’m very happy to tell you that in the reinvestigation they did not get anything out of it and they have put out a final report in favor of us. But, you see, four people were there in prison for 17 months. My colleagues. And one fellow died — a young boy, leaving two daughters and one baby in the womb — out of shock".

== Alice Garg National Museum ==
The Alice Garg National Museum is a private museum owned by the Rustomjee Memorial Foundation and is located in Malviya Nagar (Jaipur). It was set up by physicist K.B. Garg in his wife's name when their personal seashell collection became too large to be kept at home. It is the only museum dedicated entirely to seashells in India and has a collection of over 3000 sea shells.

== Awards and recognition ==
- Jamnalal Bajaj Award, 2003.
- Special Social Lifetime Achievement Award under the Godfrey Phillips Bravery National Awards, 2007.
