= T. G. K. Menon =

Indian social worker and environmentalist

- Born: Thacheril Govindan Kutty Menon; 2 March 1940; Kodungallur, Thrissur, India
- Died: June 12, 2021 (aged 81); Indore, Madhya Pradesh, India
- Occupation(s): Social worker Environmentalist
- Awards: Padma Shri; Jamnalal Bajaj Award

Thacheril Govindan Kutty Menon (March 2, 1940 - June 12, 2021) was an Indian social worker and environmentalist. His contributions are reported in the introduction of environmentally friendly irrigation and farming techniques under the aegis of Kasturbagram in Indore, Madhya Pradesh. He is known to have promoted bio-dynamic agriculture in India.

== Awards ==
- He received the Jamnalal Bajaj Award in 1989.
- The Government of India awarded him the fourth highest civilian honour of the Padma Shri in 1991.
