= Phoolbasan Bai Yadav =

Indian social worker (born 1969)

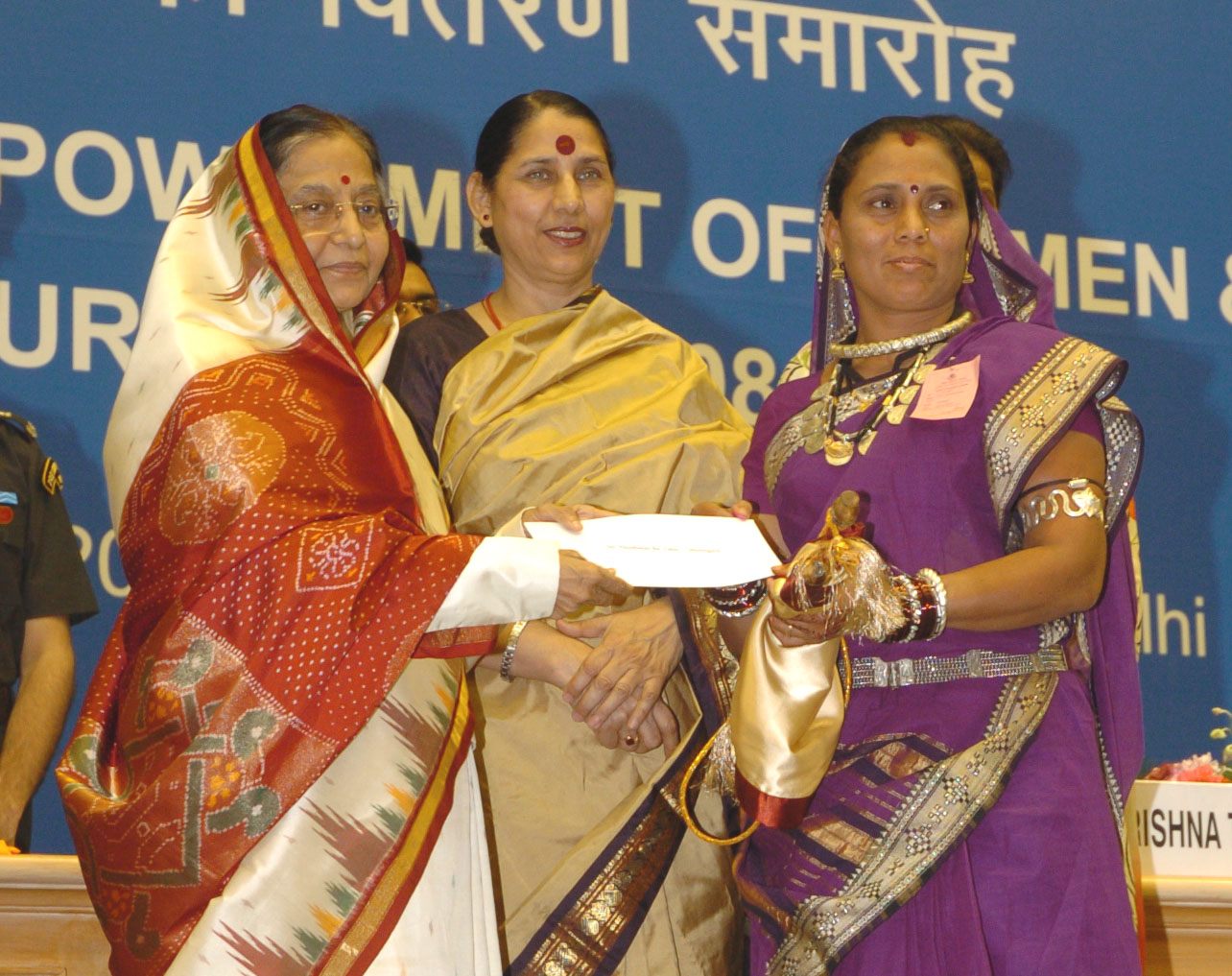
- The President, Pratibha Patil presenting the Stree Shakti Puruskar 2009 to Phoolbasan Bai Yadav
- Born: 5 December 1969 (age 56); Sukuldaihan, Dhangaon, Rajnandgaon, Chhattisgarh, India
- Occupation: Social worker
- Awards: Padma Shri; Minimata Alankaran Award; Zee TV Astithva Award; Jamnalal Bajaj Award; Kannagi Sthree Shakti Award; Sadguru Gnanananda Award; Godfrey Phillips National Bravery Award; Mahaveer Foundation Award
- Website: https://www.phoolbasanyadav.in/

Phoolbasan Bai Yadav (born 5 December 1969) is an Indian social worker and the founder of the non governmental organization, Maa Bamleshwari Janhit Kare Samiti, known for her efforts towards the development of economically and socially backward women of Chhattisgarh, India. She was honored by the Government of India, in 2012, with the fourth highest Indian civilian award of Padma Shri. She also acts as a mentor to Vision India Foundation. She appeared in the Karmveer special episode of Kaun Banega Crorepati (season 12) along with Renuka Shahane.

== Biography ==
We have faced endless nights when we went to sleep without a morsel in our stomach and realising the pain of hunger and poverty, I vowed to improve not only my situation but all such families living around and I tell you, there are countless such people in our state, says Phoolbasan Bai Yadav, about her early days.

Phoolbasan Bai Yadav was born in a socially backward family with meagre financial resources on 5 December 1970 at Sukuldaihan, a remote hamlet in the Rajnandgaon district of the Indian state of Chhattisgarh. She got married in childhood when she was 10 and had education only up to the seventh standard.

Yadav's social career started when she began taking part in the activities of the self-help groups in the district. Soon after, she formed groups of her own such as Pragya Mahila Samooh, Kiraya Bhandar, Bazar Theka and established ration shops for the distribution of food among the people below poverty line (BPL). Later, she consolidated the activities under one umbrella by forming the non governmental organization, Maa Bamleshwari Janhit Karya Samiti. The organization has since grown to cover 12000 women self help groups with a reported total strength of over 200,000 members. By collecting ₹ 2 per person, the organization has accumulated a corpus of ₹ 150 million, equivalent to US$ 3 million. The participating groups engage in activities such as health programs, education, sanitation and social reforms. They conduct regular polio vaccine clinics, have opened schools and anganwadis, organize food programs such as Bal Bhoj, set up livelihood earning programs such as sewing centres for women and campaign against child marriages. The organization, which has adopted 54 children, has a presence all over Chhattisgarh and has initiated social campaigns such as Sharab Bandh (Stop Liquor), a campaign through which tyey were reported to have succeeded in closing down 250 liquor shops in the state. The organization has been named the brand ambassadors for female foeticide by the Government of Rajasthan.

Yadav has met with many obstacles in her efforts, even from her husband, who is reported to have beaten her up and refused her entry inside home when Yadav was late from her work. However, she is known to have persisted and her organization is credited with efforts in finally getting women participation in the village councils (Gram Sabhas), in a male dominated society. Through political advocacy, the group has also succeeded in stopping child marriages, a report putting the figure at over 250. She participates in seminars to propound her message and has delivered keynote addresses at a few of them.

Phoolbasan Bai Yadav's husband is a cattle grazer by profession and the couple has four children.

== Awards and recognitions ==
Phoolbasan Yadav received the Chhattisgarh Minimata Alankaran award, in 2004, for her efforts towards women empowerment, followed by Jamnalal Bajaj Award and Zee TV Astithva award from Zee Entertainment Enterprises in 2008. The year 2010 brought her two awards, the Kannagi Sthree Shakti award from the Government of India and the Sadguru Gnanananda national award. The next year, in 2011, she won the Godfrey Phillips National Bravery Award in the social service category (Amodini Award). The Government of India awarded her the Padma Shri in 2012. The Government of Chhattisgarh has named Yadav as the brand ambassador for the maternity program called Janana Suraksha Yojana. She has also received the Mahaveer Awards presented by Bhagwan Mahaveer Foundation in the year 2014.

== See also ==
- Self help groups
- Gram Sabha
