= Sarla Behn =

English Gandhian social activist

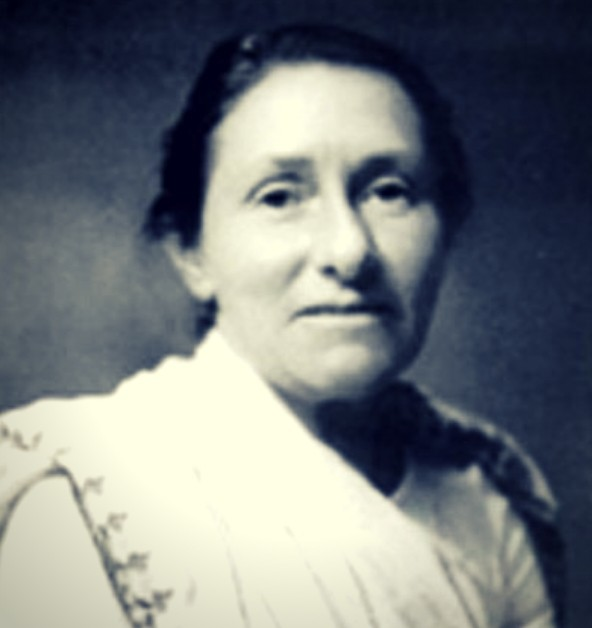
- Behn, c. 1951
- Born: Catherine Mary Heilman; 5 April 1901; Shepherd's Bush, England, United Kingdom
- Died: 8 July 1982 (aged 81); Dharamgarh, Pithoragarh district, Uttar Pradesh (present-day Uttarakhand, India)
- Other name: Catherine Mary Heilman
- Known for: follower of Gandhi and key role in the Chipko Movement

Sarla Behn (born Catherine Mary Heilman; 5 April 1901 – 8 July 1982) was an English Gandhian social activist whose work in the Kumaon region of India helped create awareness about the environmental destruction in the Himalayan forests of the state. She played a key role in the evolution of the Chipko Movement and influenced a number of Gandhian environmentalists in India including Chandi Prasad Bhatt, Bimala behn and Sunderlal Bahuguna. Along with Mirabehn, she is known as one of Mahatma Gandhi's two English daughters. The two women's work in Garhwal and Kumaon, respectively, played a key role in bringing focus on issues of environmental degradation and conservation in independent India.

== Early life ==
Sarla Behn, was born Catherine Mary Heilman in the Shepherd's Bush region of west London in 1901 to a father of German Swiss extraction and an English mother. Due to his background, her father was interned during the First World War and Catherine herself suffered ostracism and was denied scholarships at school; she left early. She worked for a while as a clerk, leaving her family and home and during the 1920s came in contact with Indian students in mannady who introduced her to Gandhi and the freedom struggle in India. Inspired, she left England for India in January 1932, never to return again.

== Life with Gandhi ==
She worked for a while at a school in Udaipur before moving on to meet Gandhi with whom she remained for eight years at his ashram at Sevagram in Wardha. Here she was deeply involved in Gandhi's idea of nai talim or basic education and worked to empower women and protect the environment at Sevagram. It was Gandhi who named her Sarla Behn. The heat and bouts of malaria afflicted her at Sevagram and with Gandhi's concurrence she headed out to the more salubrious climes of Kausani in the Almora district of the United Provinces in 1940. She made it her home, establishing an ashram and working to empower the women of the hills in Kumaon.

While in Kumaon Sarla Behn continued to associate herself with the cause of India's freedom movement. In 1942, in response to the Quit India Movement launched by the Indian National Congress under Gandhi, she helped organise and lead the movement in the Kumaon district. She travelled extensively in the region reaching out to the families of political prisoners and was imprisoned for her actions. She served two terms in prison during the Quit India Movement for violation of house arrest orders and served time at the Almora and Lucknow jails for nearly two years.

== Lakshmi Ashram ==
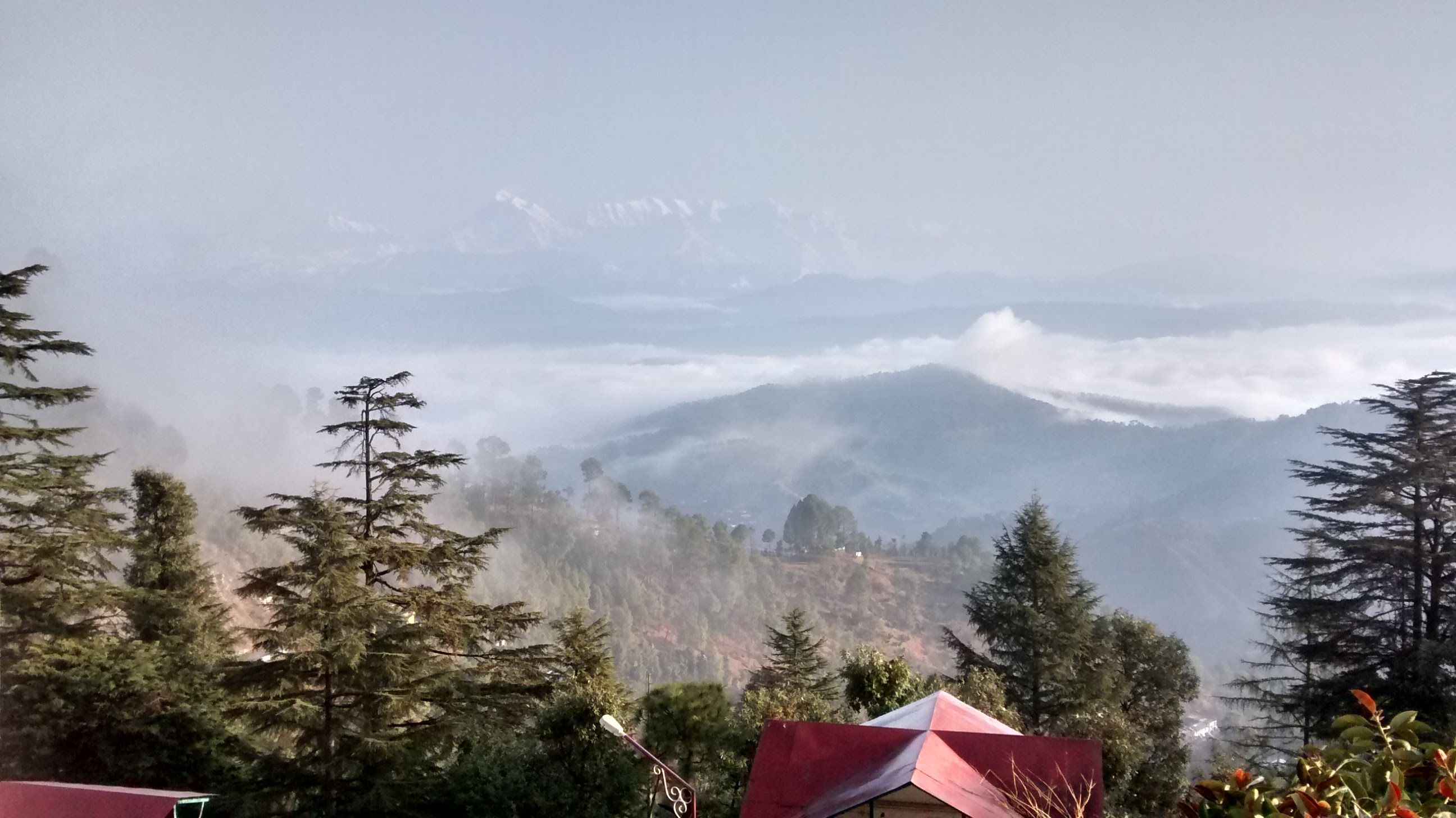
View of the Himalayas from Lakshmi Ashram

During her political activism in Kumaon, Sarla Behn was deeply impressed by the determination and resourcefulness of the women heading the families of the arrested independence activists but dismayed at their absence of self-worth when in response to her call for meetings they responded "Behnji, we are like animals. All we know is work, Meetings and other such social activities are meant only for men." She then set to work to make them realise that they were not passive animals but rather "goddesses of wealth".

This she aimed to achieve through the Kasturba Mahila Utthan Mandal, Lakshmi Ashram, Kausani, an institution she founded in 1946 with the aim of fostering women's empowerment. It was named the Lakshmi Ashram after the wife of the donor of the land. The ashram which began with only three students imparted education to girls through the Gandhian idea of nai talim with its focus on not just academics but also on manual labour and holistic learning. Since its inception, the Ashram has produced several notable reformers and social workers including Vimala Bahuguna, Sadan Misra, Radha Bhatt and Basanti Devi.

== Activism ==
Although Sarla Behn is best remembered for her role as an environmental activist who helped shape and spearhead the Chipko movement, she was also associated with the Gandhian movements led by Acharya Vinoba Bhave and Jai Prakash Narayan. After she had handed over the reins of the Ashram to Radha Bhatt, she worked with Bhave on the Bhoodan movement in Bihar in the late 1960s and with Narayan and the families of surrendered dacoits in the Chambal river valley in the early 1970s.

Sarla Behn's role as an environmental activist was even greater, and together with Mirabehn she helped shape a response to the environmental crisis engulfing the Himalayan region. As the activist-academic Vandana Shiva notes, "While the philosophical and conceptual articulation of the ecological view of the Himalayan forests has been done by Mirabehn and [Sunderlal] Bahuguna, the organisational foundation for it being a women’s movement was laid by Sarla Behn with Bimla Behn in Garhwal and Radha Bhatt in Kumaon".

Under Sarla Behn's guidance the Uttarakhand Sarvodaya Mandal came into being in 1961 with principal aims of organising women, fighting alcoholism, establishing forest based small scale industries and fighting for forest rights. Throughout the 1960s the Mandal and its members worked actively towards these ends. In the wake of the Stockholm Conference of 1972, Sarla Behn initiated the Chipko Movement which began with a popular demonstration in the Yamuna valley at a site where colonial authorities had shot dead several activists in the 1930s for protesting against the commercialisation of forests. The term 'Chipko' (which means to hug) came to be associated with the movement only later after the villagers decided they would hug the trees to prevent them from being felled and the name was popularised through the folk songs of Ghanshyam Sailani. In 1977, Sarla Behn helped organise activists and consolidate the Chipko movement in its resistance to lumbering and excessive tapping of resin from the pine trees.

Sarla Behn was a prolific author, writing 22 books in Hindi and English on issues of conservation, women's empowerment and environment including Reviving Our Dying Planet and A Blueprint for Survival of the Hills. Her autobiography is titled A Life in Two Worlds: Autobiography of Mahatma Gandhi's English Disciple.

== Death and commemoration ==
In 1975 Sarala Behn moved to a cottage at Dharamgarh in Pithoragarh district where she lived until her death in July, 1982. She was cremated according to Hindu rites at the Lakshmi Ashram. She was a winner of the Jamnalal Bajaj Award and on the occasion of her 75th birthday called the "daughter of the Himalaya" and the "mother of social activism" in Uttarakhand.

Ever since her death, the Lakshmi Ashram commemorates her anniversary by hosting a gathering of Sarvodaya workers and community members to discuss and chalk out strategies for dealing with pressing social and environmental issues. In 2006, the Government of Uttarakhand announced that it would set up a Sarla Behn Memorial Museum in Kausani.

== Legacy ==
Sarla Behn's influence on Uttarakhand in particular and Indian environmentalism has been significant although she remains a relatively unknown figure. She played a key role in inspiring grassroots organisations in Uttarakahand and helped spread the Sarvodaya movement in the state. Besides several environmentalists, she also influenced the author Bill Aitken. Her activism and the ashram she established helped, as the historian Ramachandra Guha notes, "groom a new generation of social workers, among them such remarkable activists as Chandi Prasad Bhatt, Radha Bhatt and Sunderlal Bahuguna. In the 1970s, these activists started the Chipko Movement, while in turn training the next generation of activists, those who led the movement for a state of Uttarakhand."
