= M. R. Prajapati =

Mansukhbhai Raghavjibhai Prajapati is a famous rural innovator in India known for his earthen clay-based functional products like:

1. Mitticool
2. Non Stick Clay Tawa
3. Low cost water filters

He is the holder of the Indian patents for these products, that boast high efficiency and an eco-friendly nature.

He was born in a poor Prajapati (Kumhar) family belonging to the village Nichimandal of Morbi, Rajkot Gujrat on 17 October 1965, where he had to struggle to study. He had exposure to the clay tradition since his childhood, as this was his family’s traditional profession. Mitticool was featured recently at a conference organized by the Centre for India & Global Business, Judge Business School, University of Cambridge, UK in May 2009. Bosch and Siemens Hausgeräte (BSH), Germany, one of the world’s largest home appliance companies have also written to GIAN and showed interest in the product.
