= Gandhi Peace Foundation =

Indian organisation

- Formation: 1958; 68 years ago
- Founder: R. R. Diwakar; Rajendra Prasad; Jawaharlal Nehru
- Location: India

The Gandhi Peace Foundation is an Indian organisation that studies and develops Mahatma Gandhi's thought.

== History ==
The foundation was established on 31 July 1958 to preserve and spread Gandhi's thought. It began with donation of 10 million rupees from Gandhi Smarak Nidhi. Its first board was composed of notables including R. R. Diwakar, Rajendra Prasad and Jawaharlal Nehru.

=== Presidents ===
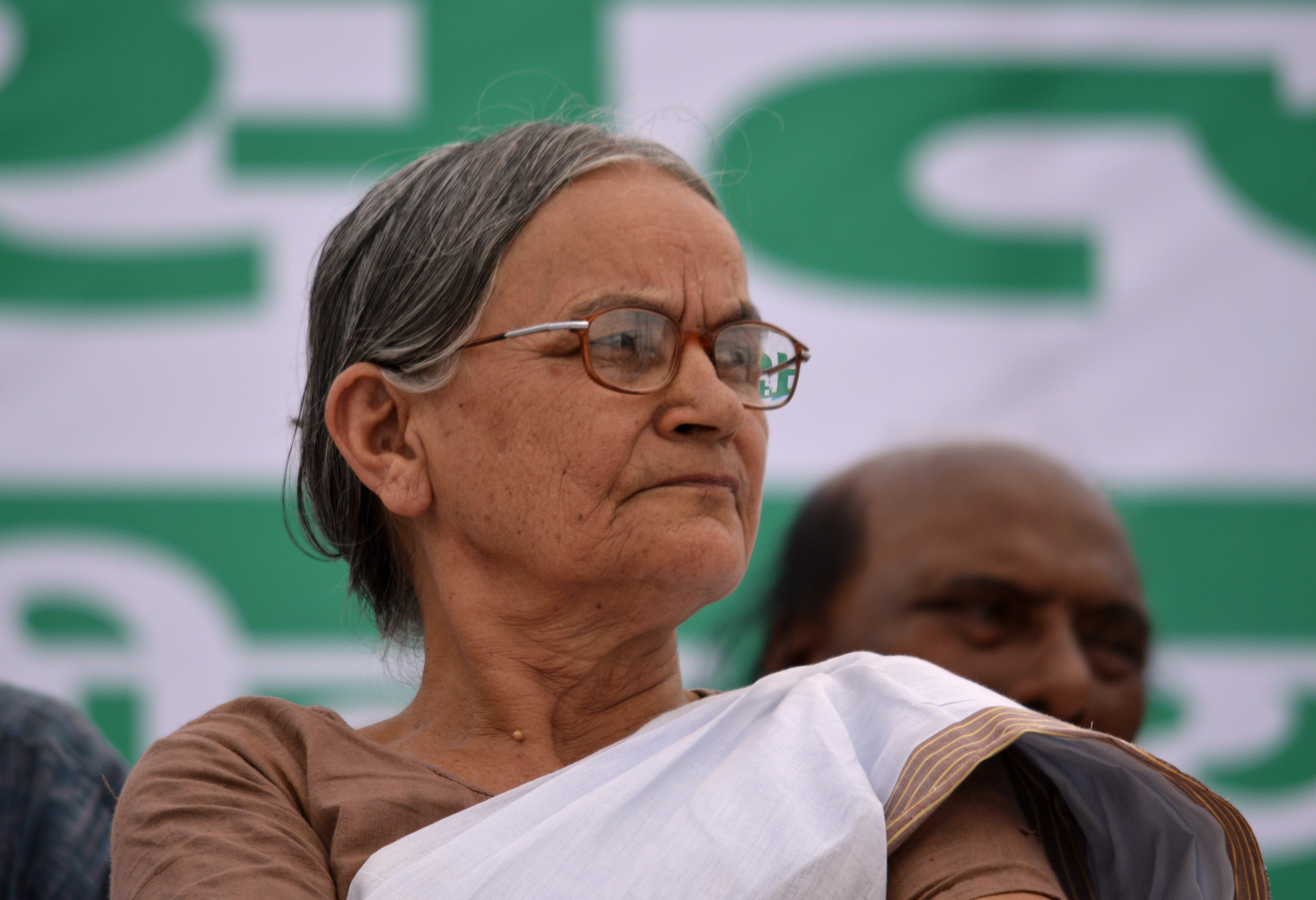
Ms. Radha Bhatt in 2012

Now Kumar Prashant is the president

- R. R. Diwakar (founder) 1958 – 1989,
- Ravindra Varma 1989 – 2006,
- Ms. Radha Bhatt from 2006

== Gandhi Marg ==
Gandhi Marg is a magazine launched in 1957 by S. K. George. He was later replaced by G. Ramachadran. Until 1965, the journal was published by Gandhi Smarak Nidhi and from its 10th annual year, it was sponsored by the Gandhi Peace Foundation. From 1973 to 1979, the magazine was not published, thereafter resuming on a monthly basis. After 1989, Gandhi Marg returned to a quarterly schedule. Since 2005 John S. Moolakkattu is the editor.

== See also ==
- Satyagraha
- Ahimsa
- Gandhism
