= Birla Vidya Mandir =

Coordinates: 29.387831°N 79.468939°E

- Nainital, Kumaon; India

Information
- Type: Private
- Established: July 17, 1947
- Principal: Anil Kumar Sharma
- Grades: Class 4 – 12
- Enrollment: 800
- Campus size: 74 [acre]
- Campus type: Residential
- Houses: Nehru, Pant, Tilak, Tagore, Subhash, Patel, Gandhi, Radhakrishnan, Raman, Vivekanand
- Sports: Soccer, Cricket, Swimming, Taekwondo, Tennis, Basketball, Table Tennis, Roller Skating, Badminton, Boxing, Gymnastic, Carrom, Volleyball, and others.
- Affiliation: CBSE, Indian Public School's Conference (IPSC), National Progressive Schools' Conference (NPSC) and International Confederation of Principals (ICP)
- Website: www.birlavidyamandir.com

Birla Vidya Mandir in Nainital is a residential boarding school for boys in India which was founded on 17 July 1947 just before Indian Independence. The school is mainly the product of the vision of Govind Ballabh Pant, an Indian independence activist.

BVM houses one of the world's highest altitude school playing fields and swimming pool. The campus is located 500 m above the town of Nainital, which is 2000 m above sea level itself. Due to this high altitude, the school experiences a temperate climate, with yearly temperatures varying from approximately -5°C to 25°C.

The annual fee for boarding students is approximately 4,00,000 INR.

The school also has a Boards Preparation Facility at Lucknow (Moti Mahal, Lucknow), which operates from the end of December to mid February for Class 10 & 12 students so that they can prepare for their board exams.

The current school campus was built in the 1870s as Oak Openings High School, where naturalist and story teller Jim Corbett studied. In 1905, Oak Openings was amalgamated with the Philander Smith Institute of Mussoorie, to create Philander Smith College. In the wake of the Second World War, Hallett War School was established on the same campus for the children of the British who were in India due to the war. Birla Vidya Mandir was then established in 1947, when Shree G. D. Birla bought this estate.

Before India achieved its independence, Pant wanted to start a public school; a donation from Ghanshyam Das Birla, a philanthropist and industrialist, made this possible. Pant then used the estate of Philander Smith, which had housed the Hallett War School during India's war years, to create Birla Vidya Mandir.

The school takes admissions from Class 4 to Class 12 mainly via an entrance examination and a short interview. Though an English medium school, the ethos is totally Indian. Prayers in Sanskrit are held before every meal and students celebrate the festivals of India.

The school is affiliated to CBSE Delhi and is a member of Indian Public School's Conference (IPSC), National Progressive Schools' Conference(NPSC), CBSE Sahodaya School Complex and International Confederation of Principals (ICP).

The school is 330 km to the northeast of Delhi in the Central Himalayan township of Nainital. Its campus is 74 acres (300,000 m^{2}) in area set at the top of a ridge, called "Sher-Ka-Danda" overlooking the lake, 1,500 feet (460 m) above the town and 7,800 feet (2,400 m) above sea level. It is connected by a motorable road.

== History ==
The estate was first owned by J.W. Waugh, and it was close to where the GB Pant Hospital (Ramsay Hospital) now stands.

"Situated just below the summit of Sher-ka-danda, the most easterly of the peaks surrounding Nainital and just above St Asaph Road", writes Martin Booth, "it commanded a stunning panoramic view of the town, the tal and the drop to the plains of India". The much expanded Birla Vidya Mandir stands in the hoary campus of the Oak Opening High School the vestiges of which still survive in the guise of much renovated Gandhi House and in all probability the Administrative Block and Library, described by Martin Booth as “Jim's original school surviving as a house close to the main building".

Jim Corbett, the famous naturalist and story teller from Nainital, attended Oak Openings School. Some of the Jim's biographers speak of the school being operated and co-owned by a ruthless and cruel ex-Indian Army Officer who was known to his 70 pupils as 'Dead Eye Dick' "for his aim both with a rifle and a bamboo cane was exceedingly accurate". It became a favourite memory of Jim's, in his later years, to remark how Oak Openings was the site of the shooting of the last himalayan quail (Ophrysia supercilosa) in 1876, driving it into extinction.

In 1905, the Philander Smith Institute of Mussoorie, founded by Mrs. Smith, widow of Mr. Philander Smith of Illinois, was moved to Nainital and "amalgamated" with the Oak Opening Boys' High School. The result was the Philander Smith College with Rev. FS Ditto as its first principal. Describing the development and expansion of Philander Smith College, Deputy Commissioner of Nainital JM Clay wrote in his monograph (Nainital, A Historical and Descriptive Account, 1927) that "The extensive buildings which now exist have been built gradually since then, and a large dormitory block has recently been constructed. The site is over 7,500 feet above sea-level and is the highest school site in India, probably in the world". Here the building being referred to is the imposing 'Ashok Bhavan' then called the 'Hurricane House.' Incidentally, Orde Wingate of Chindit Circus fame, who was born on 26 February 1903 in a house called Montrose in Nainital, had his early schooling in all probability at Philander Smith College. Despite their birthplace being the same, Jim never met the "sword and Bible" general Wingate. However, as a Lieutenant Colonel and senior instructor in jungle craft, he trained some of Orde Wingate's 'Chindits' at Chhindwara in the then Central Province.

An article by AG Atkins, the pastor of the Union Church for two summers at Nainital and better known for his translation of Ram Charit Manas, published in the Hindustan Times Sunday Magazine on 14 August 1956 says that Jim and his sister Maggie were the most awaited guests at the Philander Smith College and its sister institution the Wellesley (now the DSB College of the Kumaun University). Installing Maggie on the dais in the central hall of what now is known as Gandhi House he would lecture on his favourite subject, the Jungle Telegraph. "A tiger is coming, he would announce, and then mimic a series of bird calls: the jungle babbler, drongo, peafowl, etc. One evening after Corbett had screened his first tiger film and given his wildlife lecture at Philander Smith College, the pastor walked Corbett half way home to the lake from the college. After sometime the priest asked him what made a hunter a photographer, and the response of Jim as records Atkins was "It required much more of my skill and gives me an even greater thrill to get good pictures of my animals than when I used to hunt just to kill".
