= Snehlata Nath =

Indian activist (born 1965)

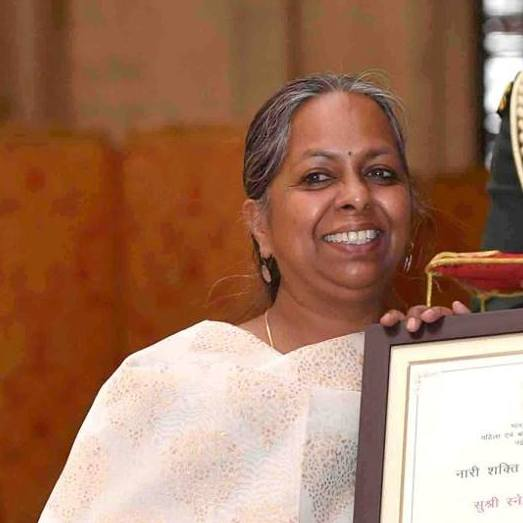

Snehlata Nath (born 27 December 1965) is an Indian activist known for her work with the Nilgiris. She is a recipient of the Jamnalal Bajaj Award and the Nari Shakti Puraskar.

== Career ==
Nath was a founding director of Keystone Foundation, which was established in 1993. The foundation tackled poverty among the Nilgiris people. The foundation established its base at Kotagiri.

In 1998, Nath co-founded the Non-Timber Forest Products – Exchange Programme and has coordinated its Indian office for over 20 years.

The Fairwild foundation was established in 2008 to create a sustainable and fair trading system for wild-collected plant ingredients. Nath serves on their advisory panel.

In 2013 she was given the Jamnalal Bajaj Award by Pranab Mukherjee for her "Outstanding Contribution in Application of Science and Technology for Rural Development".

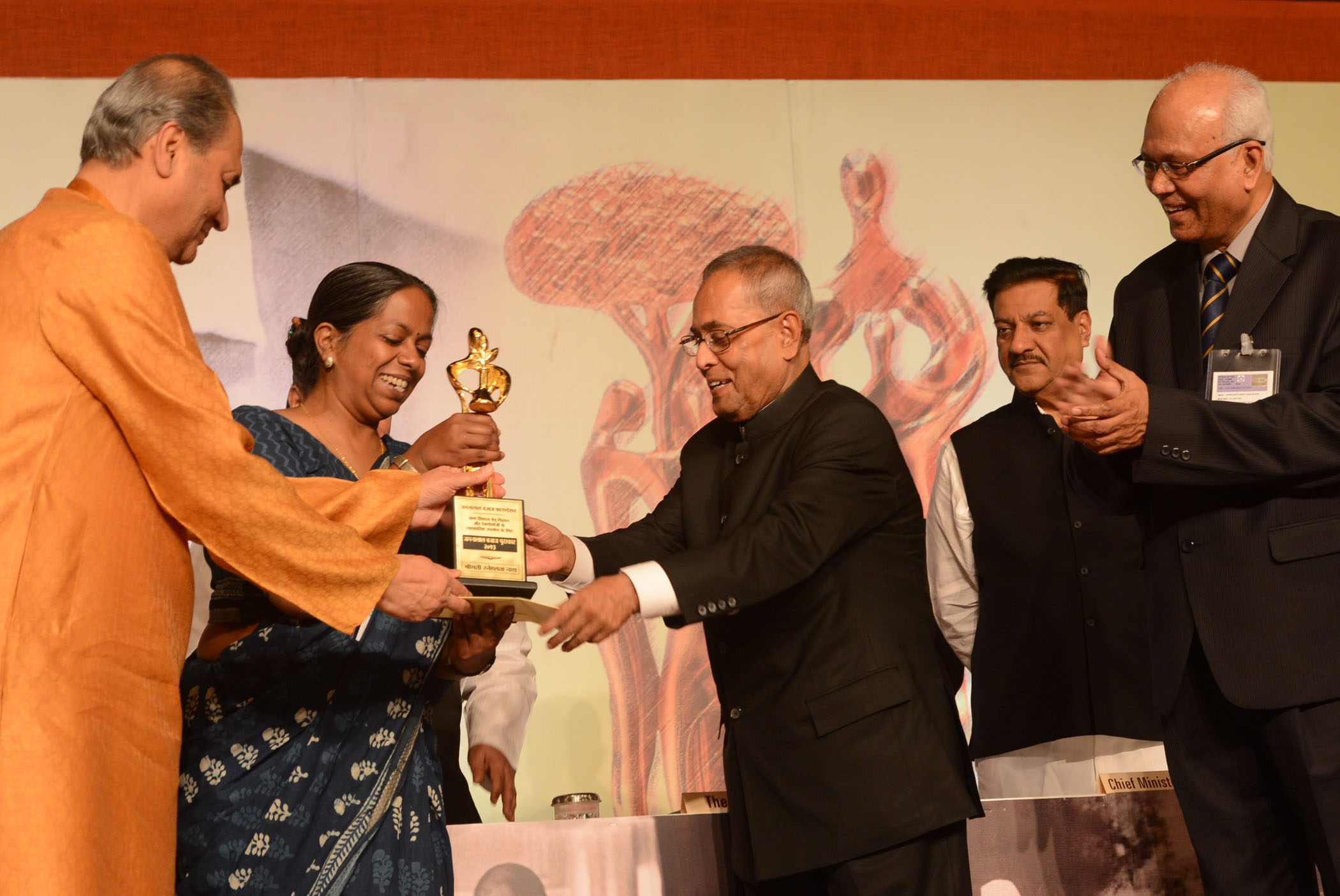
Snehlata Nath receiving Jamnalal Bajaj Award from the president Pranab Mukherjee

In 2019 Nath was invited to the presidential palace, the Rashtrapati Bhavan in New Delhi. She was one of 41 women to receive the highest civilian honour for women in India, the Nari Shakti Puraskar, from Ramnath Kovind. Nath had been working in eco-development and sustainability at the Nilgiri Biosphere Reserve for 26 years.
