= Mahatma Gandhi National Memorial Trust =

Indian government fund

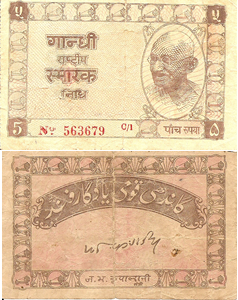
Fund-raising receipt for the Gandhi Smarak Nidhi signed by Acharya Kriplani from 1949. It says "Gandhi Rashtriya Smarak Nidhi" in Hindi on one side, and "Gandhi Qaumi Yaadgar Fund" in Urdu on the obverse.

The National Gandhi Memorial Trust (Hindi: गाँधी स्मारक निधि) also called the Gandhi Qaumi Yaadgar Fund, is a memorial trust run by the Central Government of India established to commemorate the life of Mahatma Gandhi. It funds the maintenance of various places associated with Mahatma Gandhi's activities during India's freedom movement, and is also a leading producer of literature on Gandhi and Gandhian thought in India.

The initial 1949 public fund raising for the Trust was considered to be very successful, and Dr. Martin Luther King Jr. wrote that the $130 million raised (equivalent to $1.76 billion in 2025) was "perhaps the largest, spontaneous, mass monetary contribution to the memory of a single individual in the history of the world."

== See also ==
- Mani Bhavan
