= Shanti Sena =

Gandhi's peace army & related groups

The Shanti Sena or "Peace army" was made up of Gandhi's non-violent followers in India.

Other movements have developed, inspired by this one, sometimes also using the name used by Gandhi's group. These may include World Peace Brigade, Nonviolent Peaceforce, Swaraj Peeth, Peace Brigades International and participants in the Rainbow Gathering, and have served as a basis for the practice of Third Party Non-violent Intervention.

"Shanti Sena" is a term coined by Gandhi when he conceptualized a nonviolent volunteer peacekeeping program dedicated to minimizing communal violence within the Indian populace. The words "Shanti" and "Sena" both come from Sanskrit. "Shanti" means peace and "sena" means army, or a drilled band of men. The word "sena" has been criticized for its connection to militarism, but for Gandhi, it had strong metaphorical and spiritual qualities connected to its use in the Hindu vedas.

In the aftermath of the Gandhian era, Shanti Sena has appeared in various incarnations. Two Gandhian followers developed separate groups based on their interpretations of it: Vinoba Bhave established a Shanti Sena that prioritized Gandhi's spiritual approach towards the program, while Jayaprakash Narayan established a program that focused more on the political motivations of the program. The Shanti Sena program also became institutionalized into India's Gandhigram Rural University, where it was incorporated into the university's constitution. Currently Shanti Sena is also very active in Sri Lanka as a part of the organization Sarvodaya.
