= Sarvodaya =

Sanskrit neologism used to define Gandhian philosophy of equality

Sarvōdaya (Hindi: सर्वोदय, from sarv-, 'all' and uday, 'rising') is a Sanskrit term which generally means "universal uplift" or "progress of all". The term was used by Mahatma Gandhi as the title of his 1908 translation of John Ruskin's critique of political economy, Unto This Last, and Gandhi came to use the term for the ideal of his own political philosophy. Later Gandhians, like the Indian nonviolence activist Vinoba Bhave, embraced the term as a name for the social movement in post-independence India which strove to ensure that self-determination and equality reached all strata of Indian society. Samantabhadra, an illustrious Digambara monk, as early as the 2nd century A.D., was called the tīrtha of Mahāvīra (24th Tirthankara) by the name sarvodaya.

== Origins and Gandhi's political ideal ==
Gandhi received a copy of Ruskin's Unto This Last from a British friend, Henry Polak, while working as a lawyer in South Africa in 1904. In his Autobiography, Gandhi remembers the twenty-four-hour train ride to Durban (from when he first read the book), being so in the grip of Ruskin's ideas that he could not sleep at all: "I determined to change my life in accordance with the ideals of the book." As Gandhi construed it, Ruskin's outlook on political-economic life extended from three central tenets:

That

1. the good of the individual is contained in the good of all.
2. a lawyer's work has the same value as the barber's in as much as all have the same right of earning their livelihood from their work.
3. a life of labour, i.e., the life of the tiller of the soil and the handicraftsman is the life worth living.

The first of these I knew. The second I had dimly realized. The third had never occurred to me. Unto This Last made it clear as daylight for me that the second and third were contained in the first. I arose with the dawn, ready to reduce these principles to practice.

Four years later, in 1908, Gandhi rendered a paraphrased translation of Ruskin's book into his native tongue of Gujarati. He entitled the book Sarvodaya, a compound (sandhi) he invented from two Sanskrit roots: sarva (all) and udaya (uplift) — "the uplift of all" (or as Gandhi glossed it in his autobiography, "the welfare of all").

Although inspired by Ruskin, the term would for Gandhi come to stand for a political ideal of his own stamp (Indeed, Gandhi was keen to distance himself from Ruskin's more conservative ideas). The ideal which Gandhi strove to put into practice in his ashrams was, he hoped, one that he could persuade the whole of India to embrace, becoming a light to the other nations of the world. The Gandhian social ideal encompassed the dignity of labor, an equitable distribution of wealth, communal self-sufficiency and individual freedom.

== Sarvodaya movement ==
Gandhi's ideals have lasted well beyond the achievement of one of his chief projects, Indian independence (swaraj). His followers in India (notably, Vinoba Bhave) continued working to promote the kind of society that he envisioned, and their efforts have come to be known as the Sarvodaya Movement. Anima Bose has referred to the movement's philosophy as "a fuller and richer concept of people's democracy than any we have yet known." Sarvodaya workers associated with Vinoba Bhave, Jaya Prakash Narayan, Dada Dharmadhikari, Ravishankar Maharaj, Charu Chandra Bhandari, Dhirendra Mazumdaar, Shankarrao Deo, K. G. Mashruwala undertook various projects aimed at encouraging popular self-organisation during the 1950s and 1960s, including Bhoodan and Gramdan movements. Many groups descended from these networks continue to function locally in India today.

Beginning on the one year anniversary of the immersion of Gandhi's ashes, an annual Sarvodaya mela or festival has been held at Srirangapatna. and at Tirunavaya. At the latter site, it was instituted by K. Kelappan (Kelappaji).

== See also ==
- Indian Opinion
- A. T. Ariyaratne
- Hermann Kallenbach
- Totaram Sanadhya
- Sarvodaya Shramadana Movement, a Sri Lankan organization based on the principle of Sarvodaya.
