= Bhoodan movement =

Voluntary land reform movement in India

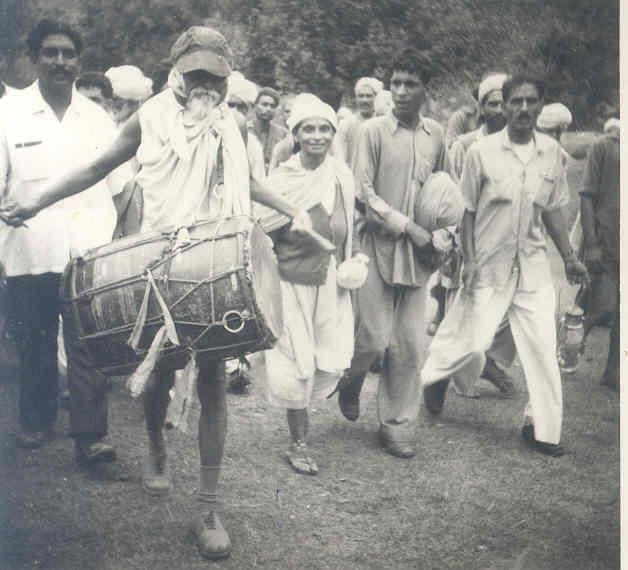
Gandhian Vinoba Bhave during his padyantra across India, as part of Bhoodan movement in 1951.

The Bhoodan movement (Land Gift movement), also known as the Bloodless Revolution, was a voluntary land reform movement in India. It was initiated by Gandhian Vinoba Bhave in 1951 at Pochampally village, Pochampally.

The Bhoodan movement attempted to persuade wealthy landowners to voluntarily give a percentage of their land to landless people. Bhave drew philosophical inspiration from the Sarvodaya movement and Gram Swarajya.

== Method ==
Landless laborers were given small plots on which they could settle and grow their crops. This Act was passed so that the beneficiary had no right to sell the land or use it for non-agricultural purposes or forestry. For example, Section 25 of the Maharashtra State Bhoodan Act states that the beneficiary (who must be landless) should only use the land for subsistence cultivation. If the "owner" failed to cultivate the land for over a year or tried to use it for non-agriculture activities, the government would have the right to confiscate it.

Bhave wanted peasants to give up using bullocks, tractors, or other machines for agricultural purposes. This was called rishi-kheti in Hindi. Bhave also wanted the people to give up using money in the form of kanchan-dan. The movement had the support of Congress. JP Narayan withdrew from active politics to join the Bhoodan movement in 1953.

== History ==
Bhave crossed India on foot to persuade landowners to give up a piece of their land. His first success came on 18 April 1951 at Pochampally village in Nalgonda district, Andhra Pradesh (now in Telangana) which was the center of communist activity. It was the culmination of the Telangana peasant movement. A violent struggle had been launched by peasants against the local landlords.

Movement organizers had arranged for Bhave to stay at Pochampally, a village of about 700 families, of whom two-thirds were landless. Bhave visited the Harijan colony. By early afternoon, villagers began to gather around him. The Harijans asked for 80 acres (32 ha) of land, forty wet, forty dry, for forty families. Bhave asked, "If it is not possible to get land from the government, is there not something villagers themselves could do?"

V. Ramachandra Reddy initially offered a donation of 100 acres (40 ha) of his 3,500 acres (14 km^{2}) land. Later, he donated 800 acres (3.2 km^{2}). He joined social reform. After him, the land donation movement continued under a Bhoodan trust movement with the help of his sons. The 7th Nizam of Hyderabad, Mir Osman Ali Khan also donated 14,000 acres (57 km^{2}) of his personal land to the Bhoodan movement.

Other landowners including Raja Bahadur Giriwar Narayan Singh, C.B.E. and Raja of Ranka (Garhwa Jharkhand) donated a combined 102,001 acres (412.78 km^{2}) acres to the Bhoodan initiative, the largest donation in India. Raja saheb Rajeshwari Prasad Singh ji of Namudag mahuari estate also donated 1.01 lakh acres to the Bhoodan initiative.

Maharaja Kamakhya Narain Singh Bahadur of Ramgarh Raj donated 200,000 acres (810 km^{2}) of land to Vinoba Bhave and others under the Bihar Bhoodan Yagna Act, before the institution of the suit, making it the biggest donation from any king. Maharajadhiraj Kameshwar Singh ji of Darbhanga Raj donated 1.17 lakh acres of land in bhudan movement.

During Vinoba Bhave's Surajgarh visit, he was welcomed by headmaster Rambilas Sharma, who was instrumental in spreading the Bhoodan movement in the Jhunjhunu district in the late 1950s and early 1960s.

The initial objective of the movement was to secure voluntary donations and distribute them to the landless but soon came to demand 1/6 of all private land. In 1952, the movement widened the concept of gram dan ("village in gift" or the donation of an entire village) and started advocating common ownership of land. The first village to come under gramdan was Mangroth in Hamirpur district of Uttar Pradesh. The second and third gramdan took place in Orissa in 1955.

== Legacy ==
This movement developed into a village gift or gramdan movement and was a part of a comprehensive movement for establishing a Sarvodaya society (the rise of all socio-economic-political order), both in and outside India.

By the 1960s, the movement had lost momentum. The Sarvodaya Samaj failed to build a mass movement that would generate pressure for social transformation. However, the movement made a significant contribution by creating moral ambivalence, putting pressure on landlords, and creating conditions favourable to the landless.
