= Gandhians =

Term used for followers of Mahatma Gandhi

The followers of Mahatma Gandhi, one of the prominent figure of the Indian independence movement, are called Gandhians.

Gandhi's legacy includes a wide range of ideas ranging from his dream of ideal India, those being environmentalism, women's rights, animal rights, spirituality, truth, nonviolence, asceticism, among others. Thus Gandhians hailing from a wide range of work profile attribute their ideas to him.

An overwhelming number of Bharat Ratna awardees are such individuals. In a 2012 poll called The Greatest Indian, the jury decided to keep Gandhi out as it "is impossible for anyone to come close to the father of the nation when it comes to leadership, impact and contribution". The poll included as many as 10 individuals in top 20 who were either close aides, disciples, successors or Gandhian ideologues. (Note: Among the top 20 entries of The Greatest Indian: Close aides: Vallabhbhai Patel, Jawaharlal Nehru, C. Rajagopalachari, Vinoba Bhave, Kamaladevi Chattopadhyay; Disciples: Baba Amte, Ela Bhatt, Jayaprakash Narayan; Ideologues: Atal Bihari Vajpayee, Ram Manohar Lohia)

Name	Notes
Jawaharlal Nehru	Gandhi designated him as his political heir.
Vallabhbhai Patel	Along with Nehru, Patel was the closest aide of Gandhi.
Vinoba Bhave	He is deemed as the spiritual heir of Gandhi
Nelson Mandela	First president of South Africa
François Bayrou	French politician who served as cabinet minister of various departments
Martin Luther King Jr.	American civil rights movement activist
Ho Chi Minh	Founding father of Vietnam
Maulana Azad	First education minister of India
Atal Bihari Vajpayee	Former Prime Minister of India
Narendra Modi	Current Prime Minister of India
Abdul Ghaffar Khan	Also called "the Frontier Gandhi"
Sarojini Naidu	1st Governors of the United Provinces of Independent India
Tanguturi Prakasam	First Chief Minister of Andhra Pradesh
K. Chandrashekar Rao	Former Chief Minister of Telangana
C. Rajagopalachari	Last Governor-General of India
Maria Lacerda de Moura	Brazilian reformer
Eric Adams	Mayor of New York City
George Joseph	Indian independence activist
Habib Bourguiba	First Prime Minister of Tunisia
Kailash Satyarthi	Nobel Peace Prize laureate
Ashok Gehlot	Current Chief Minister of Rajasthan
Shankarrao Deo	Independence activist
Mehdi Bazargan	Leading figure of Iranian Revolution along with Ruhollah Khomeini and Morteza Motahhari
Mirabehn	Independence activist, described Gandhi as Jesus Christ
Govind Vallabh Pant	First Chief Minister of Uttar Pradesh
Sushila Nayyar	Indian politician and independence activist
Jamnalal Bajaj	Indian industrialist
Sharad Pawar	Former Chief Minister of Maharashtra
Draupadi Murmu	Current President of India
M.G. Ramachandran	Former Chief Minister of Tamil Nadu, and influential actor in tamil cinema.
K. Kamaraj	Former Chief Minister of Tamil Nadu
Dalai Lama	Tibetan Spiritual Leader
Aung San Suu Kyi	Myanmar Pro Democracy leader
Cesar Chavez	American Civil Rights Activist
Albert Einstein	World Renowned Physicist
Barack Obama	44th US President
Lula Da Silva	Current President of Brazil

== See also ==
- Eleven vows
