= Kothari Commission =

Commission in the Indian government

National Education Commission (1964-1966)
- Kothari Commission

Agency overview
- Formed: 14 July 1964
- Dissolved: 29 June 1966
- Jurisdiction: Government of India
- Headquarters: New Delhi
- Agency executives: D. S. Kothari, Chairman; [J. P. Naik], Secretary; J. F. McDougall, Associate secretary; A. R. Dawood H. L. Elvin R. A. Gopalswami V. S. Jha P. N. Kirpal M. V. Mathur B. P. Pal Kumari S. Panandikar Roger Revelle K. G. Saiyidain T. Sen Jean Thomas S. A. Shumovsky Sadatoshi Ihara, Members

National Education Commission (1964-1966), popularly known as Kothari Commission, was an ad hoc commission set up by the Government of India to examine all aspects of the educational sector in India, to develop a general pattern of education, and to recommend guidelines and policies for the development of education in India. It was formed on 14 July 1964 under the chairmanship of Daulat Singh Kothari, then chairman of the University Grants Commission. The terms of reference of the commission was to formulate the general principles and guidelines for the development of education from primary level to the highest and advise the government on a standardized national pattern of education in India. However, the medical and legal studies were excluded from the purview of the commission. The tenancy of the commission was from 1964 to 1966 and the report was submitted by the commission on 29 June 1966.

== Structure ==
The commission, under the chairmanship of Daulat Singh Kothari, was the sixth commission in India post independence and the first commission with comprehensive terms of reference on education. It was composed of a member secretary, an associate secretary and fifteen members. Apart from the core group, the commission had a panel of overseas consultants numbering twenty and nineteen task forces, their sub groups and special panels of invitees.

== Core group ==
No.	Designation	Name	Position
1	Chairman	D. S. Kothari	Chairman, University Grants Commission
2	Member Secretary	J. P. Naik	Head, Dept of Edu. Planning, Admn and Finance Gokhale Institute of Politics and Economics, Pune
3	Associate Secretary	J. F. McDougall	Assistant Director, Department of School and Higher Education, UNESCO, Paris
4	Member	A. R. Dawood	Director, Extension Programmes for Secondary Education, New Delhi
5	Member	H. L. Elvin	Director, Institute of Education, University College of London
6	Member	R. A. Gopalaswami	Director, Institute of Applied Manpower Research, New Delhi
7	Member	V. S. Jha	Director of the Commonwealth Education Liaison Unit, London
8	Member	P. N. Kirpal	Educational Adviser to the Government of India
9	Member	M. V. Mathur	Professor, Economics and Public Administration, University of Rajasthan
10	Member	B. P. Pal	Director, Indian Agricultural Research Institute, New Delhi
11	Member	Kum. S. Panandikar	Head of the Department of Education, Karnataka University, Dharwad
12	Member	Roger Revelle	Dean of Research, University of California, USA
13	Member	K. G. Saiyidain	Educational Adviser to the Government of India
14	Member	T. Sen	Rector, Jadavpur University, Calcutta
15	Member	Jean Thomas	Inspector General of Education, France, and formerly Assistant Director-General of UNESCO
16	Member	S. A. Shumovsky	Director, Methodological Division, Ministry of Higher and Special Secondary Education, RSFSR, Moscow
17	Member	Sadatoshi Ihara	Professor of the First Faculty of Science and Technology, Waseda University, Tokyo

== Consultants ==
A panel of 20 consultants, selected from various parts of the world and deemed experts in education, was constituted for consultative assistance to the commission.

No.	Incumbent	Position
1	James E. Allen, Jr.	Commissioner, State Education Department, USA
2	C. E. Beeby	Visiting Professor, Graduate School of Education, Harvard University
3	P. M. S. Blackett	President, the Royal Society, UK
4	Recteur J. J. Capelle	Director-General of Education in France, Paris
5	Christopher Cox	Educational Adviser, Ministry of Overseas Development, UK
6	Philip H. Coombs	Director, UNESCO International Institute for Educational Planning, Paris
7	Andre Daniere	Centre for Studies in Education and Development, Graduate School of Education, Harvard University
8	Stevan Dedijer	Institute of Sociology, University of Lund, Sweden
9	Nicholas DeWitt	Director, International Survey of Educational Development and Planning, Indiana University, USA
10	John Guy Fowlkes	School of Education, University of Wisconsin, Madison, USA
11	Willis Jackson	Professor of Electrical Engineering, Imperial College of Science and Technology, University of London
12	J. Paul Leonard	Professor of Education, Columbia University Teachers' College
13	Gordon N. Mackenzie	Professor of Education, Teachers' College, Columbia University, New York, USA
14	C. A. Moser	Director, Unit for Economic and Statistical Studies on Higher Education, London School of Economics
15	S. Okita	Executive Director, Japan Economic Research Centre, Tokyo
16	A. R. Prest	Professor of Economics and Public Finance, University of Manchester, England
17	Lionel Robbins	Professor Emeritus, London School of Economics
18	Edward A. Shils	Professor, University of Chicago, USA
19	Frederick Seitz	President, National Academy of Sciences, Washington, USA
20	W. C. Smith	Director, Centre for the Study of World Religions, Harvard University

== Task Forces and Working Groups ==
The main front line activities were handled by nineteen task forces or working groups, each handling a specific area of activity.

Task Force on Adult Education The group's main objective was the eradication of illiteracy by focusing on adult education. The group was composed of three foreign members, J. F. McDougall, Welthy Fischer and Hans Simons and fifteen Indian members, V. S. Jha, Abdul Qadir, G. K. Chandiramani, A. R. Deshpande, Durgabai Deshmukh, K. L. Joshi, D. R. Kalia, T. A. Koshy, M. S. Mehra, A. R. Moore, J. P. Naik, M. S. Randhawa, K. G. Saiyidain, Sohan Singh and group secretary, S. M. S. Chari.

Task Force on Agriculture Education The group had 15 members of which two were foreign members, J. F. McDougall and R. W. Cummings. The Indian members included B. P. Pal, Hashim Amir Ali, Anant Rao, Chintamani Singh, V. M. Dandekar, K. C. Kanungo, A. B. Joshi, S. N. Mehrotra, S. K. Mukherji, J. P. Naik, K. C. Naik, N. K. Panikar, C. S. Ranganathan, S. C. Verma and secretary, S. Ramanujam. The group focused on the development of agricultural education.

Task Force on Educational Administration This twelve member group examined the shortcomings on the educational administration and had Prem Kirpal, A. C. Deve Gowda, V. Jagannadham, M. V. Mathur, S. N. Mukherjee, J. P. Naik, H. M. Patel, D. M. Sen, J. D. Sharma, V. D. Sharma, Rudra Dutt Singh and S. Rajan (secretary) as its members.

Task Force on Educational Finance The task before the group was to examine the existing set up with regard to educational finance and identify ways to overcome the shortfalls. The group had M. V. Mathur, D. A. Dabholkar, B. Dutta, R. A. Gopalaswami, K. L. Joshi, D. T. Lakdawala, Gautam Mathur, Atmanand Misra, Sadashiv Misra, J. P. Naik, K. A. Naqvi, Pritam Singh and Gurbax Singh (secretary) as its members.

Task Force on Higher Education The group's objective was to coordinate the higher education system in India and advise on ways of improvement. The group was one of the largest and had 20 members, including three overseas members, J. F. McDougall, Hans Simons and H. J. Taylor. The Indian members were K. G. Saiyidain, J. W. Airan, P. K. Bose, Chandrahasan, V. S. Jha, A. C. Joshi, K. L. Joshi, C. L. Kapur, D. S. Kothari, M. V. Mathur, P. G. Mavlankar, J. P. Naik, P. J. Philip, A. B. Shah, Amrik Singh, R. K. Singh and S. Rehman (secretary).

Task Force on Manpower The group had twelve members which included R. A. Gopalaswami, Abdul Qadir, K. L. Joshi, M. V. Mathur, J. P. Naik, R. Prasad, T. Sen and S. P. Aggarwal. The group had its mandate to examine the recruitment and training of teaching and non teaching staff.

Task Force on Techniques and Methods in Education This seventeen member task force was entrusted with the designing of the functional mechanics of the educational system. The members were V. S. Jha, G. K. Athalye (later replaced by S. L. Ahluwallia), M. L. Bharadwaj, A. R. Dawood, S. Dutt, C. L. Kapur, S. S. Kulkarni, J. C. Mathur, J. F. McDougall, S. K. Mitra, J. P. Naik, Paul Neurath, S. Panandikar, Albert J. Perrelli, S. Rehman, J. M. Ure (later replaced by D. A. Smith) and S. M. S. Chari, who served as the Secretary.

Task Force on Professional, Vocational and Technical Education The group trained its focus on the professional and vocational courses. The group had sixteen members including the associate secretary, J. F. McDougall. The other members were T. Sen, S. K. Bose, G. K. Chandiramani, L. S. Chandrakant, D. R. Dhingra, R. N. Dogra, V. G. Garde, R. A. Gopalaswami, K. L. Joshi, P. K. Kelkar, S. G. Pendse, S. C. Sen, R. K. Srivastav, H. C. Visvesvaraya and secretary, S. Venkatesh.

Task Force on Science Education The mandate of the group was to focus on the science education excluding medical education and consisted of D. S. Kothari, S. Deb, B. D. Jain, P. Florence Nightingale, R. C. Paul, R. N. Rai, T. S. Sadasivan, D. Shankernarayan, Shantinarayan, A. R. Verma, R. D. Deshpande and I. C. Menon (secretary).

Task Force on School Education The group worked on the modalities of school education excluding primary education in India. It consisted of twelve members including the commission secretary, J. P. Naik along with A. R. Dawood, K. L. Gupta, G. S. Khair, K. Kuruvila Jacob, D. R. Mankad, P. N. Mathar, R. Muralidharan, S. Panandikar, H. Radhakrishna, S. N. Saraf, and S. Doraiswami (secretary).

Task Force on Student Welfare The welfare aspects of the students including scholarships and other measures of incentives were attended to by this group which had A. R. Dawood, V. S. Jha, D. R. Mankad, M. S. Mehta, Perin H. Mehta, J. P. Naik, Prem Pasricha, V. Ramakrishna, A. S. Raturi, D. S. Reddy, S. L. Saruparia, Vikram Singh and S. Doraiswami (secretary) as its members.

Task Force on Teacher Education and Teacher Status The group inspected the proficiency of the teachers and their remuneration packages. One of the tasks before the group was to standardize the public and private sector compensation packages and also to design a machinery for continuous on-job training of the teachers. The members of the group were S. Panandikar, S. P. Aggarwal, Reginald Bell, A. C. Deve Gowda, G. N. Kaul, J. P. Naik, S. Natarajan, K. G. Saiyidain, Salamatullah and M. D. Paul (secretary).

Working Group on Educational Buildings This group had its focus on the educational infrastructure and had several construction and infrastructure experts among its fifteen members. The members were A. R. Dawood, R. K. Chhabra, Dinesh Mohan, B. V. Doshi, J. F. McDougall, M. M. Mistri, J. P. Naik, M. H. Pandya, C. B. Patel, S. Rahaman, J. L. Sehgal, T. S. Vedagiri, H. C. Visvesaraya, H. Williams and S. Venkatesh (secretary).

Working Group on Education of the Backward Classes The group had fifteen members and was mandated to focus on the education of the scheduled caste, scheduled tribe and other backward communities in India. L. M. Shrikant, Sashimeren Aier, N. V. Bapat, S. R. Bhise, P. D. Kulkarani, J. Lakra, D. J. Naik, J. P. Naik, V. Rajlakshmi, T. Sanganna, S. C. Sen Gupta, Manikya Lal Verma, Vimal Chandra, N. M. Wadiwa and the secretary of the group, Gurbax Singh were the members.

Working Group on Educational Statistics The group provided the statistical tools for the commission and had J. P. Naik, S. P. Aggarwal, R. K. Chhabra, G. P. Khare, D. Natarajan, H. Webster and Gurbax Singh (secretary) as members.

Working Group on Pre-Primary Education This group was intended to work on the primary education and its standardization as the primary education till that time was unorganized with several different schools such as basic primary and Montessori systems in practice. The group had ten women, S. Panandikar, Bilquis Ghufran, L. Jesudian, Shalini Moghe, A. Pakrashi, Grace Tucker, P. K. Varalakshmi, Amrita Varma and R. Muralidharan and two men, M. C. Nanavatty and Shesh Namle as members.

Working Group on School Community Relations The group composed of L. R. Desai, Hulbe, V. S. Jha, H. B. Majumder, P. N. Mathur, J. P. Naik, M. C. Nanavatty, H. Radhakrishna, K. G. Saiyidain, R. K. Singh and M. P. Balakrishnan (secretary) worked on the extra curricular ambience and activities of the education.

Working Group on School Curriculum This group had one of the major tasks of the commission which included the design and development of a standardized curriculum to be used across the country. S. Panandikar, J. P. Naik, A. R. Dawood, L. S. Chandrakant, A. J. Perrelli and B. Ghosh (secretary) were the members.

Working Group on Women's Education The group, consisting the chairman, D. S. Kothari and the commission secretary, J. P. Naik, had Durgabai Deshmukh, Rajammal Devadas, P. N. Mathur, S. Panandikar, K. G. Saiyidain, Raksha Saran, Premlila V. Thackersey and S. Rajan (Secretary) as members.

== Sub groups and invitees ==
Besides the task forces, the commission had twenty one sub groups assisting the task forces on specific assignments. They were:

1. Sub group on Literacy Education
2. Sub group on Role of Universities and Institutions of Higher Learning in Adult Education
3. Sub group on Education of Workers
4. Sub group on Role of Cultural Institutions in Adult Education
5. Sub group on Equalization of Educational Opportunities at University Level
6. Sub group on Rural Higher Education
7. Sub group on Salaries of Teachers
8. Sub group on University Standards
9. Sub group on Evolution at University Level
10. Sub group on the Functions of a university
11. Sub group on Policy of Admissions and Substandard Institutions
12. Sub group on Secondary Education
13. Sub group on Evolution at The School Stage
14. Sub group on Hostels
15. Sub group on Guidance and Counselling
16. Sub group on Health Services
17. Sub group on Teacher Education
18. Sub group on Evaluation in Teacher Education
19. Sub group on Comprehensive Scheme of Teacher Training
20. Sub group on Recruitment, Pay Scales and Conditions of Service of Teachers
21. Sub group on Statistical Calculations, Finance and Unit Costs

C. Gilpatric, M. S. Mehta, Prof. M. Mehrotra, H. H. Howes, Nauhria Ram and Olive 1. Reddick served as special invitees of the sub groups.

== Report ==
9000 individuals covering educators, scholars and scientists were interviewed and 2400 memorandums were examined by the commission, during a period spanning 21 months. The commission submitted its 287-page report on 29 June 1966 to M. C. Chagla, the then minister of education. The report had four sub sections:

- Section I : General issues
- Section II : Stages of Education
- Section III : Recommendations and programmes
- Section IV : Additional papers

The four main themes of the commission were:

1. Increase in Productivity
2. Promoting social and National Integration
3. Education and Modernization
4. Developing social, moral and spiritual values

=== Main recommendations ===
One of the main recommendations of the commission was the standardization of educational system on 10+2+3 pattern, across the country. It advised that the pre-primary education which had different names such as kindergarten, Montessori and pre-basic should be renamed as pre-primary and the primary education (renamed as lower primary) to be up to the 4th standard. It further classified the schooling as upper primary or higher primary and high school (up to standard X). The under graduate education was identified as XI and XII standards under the name, higher secondary or pre university. The graduate studies were recommended to be standardized as a three-year course. The educational system up to eighth standard was categorized as first (primary education), second (secondary education up to XII) and third levels of education (higher studies).

The commission recommended that a common public education system should be introduced and then it should be vocationalized in general and special streams by introducing work experience as a part of education. It further stressed on the need to make work experience and social/national service as an integral part of education. Specialization of subjects were advised to be started from higher secondary levels.

The days of instruction were recommended to be increased to 234 for schools and 216 for colleges and the working hours to be fixed at not less than 1000 hours per academic year, preferably higher at 1100 or 1200 hours. It also advised for reduction of national holidays. Linking of colleges to a number of schools in the neighborhood, utilization of school facilities 8 hours a day all through the year, establishment of book banks, identification of talents and provision of scholarships, setting up of day study and residential facilities and opportunities for students to earn while studying were some of the other recommendations of the commission. It also emphasized on free education up to and including lower secondary level of education.

Commission laid stress on women education and advised setting up of state and central level committees for overseeing women education. It suggested establishing schools and hostels for women and urged to identify ways to find job opportunities for women in the educational sector. Focusing on equalization of opportunities to all irrespective of caste, religion and gender and to achieve social and national integration, the schools were advised to provide education to backward classes on a priority basis and the minimum level of enrollment at a secondary school were advised to be not less than 360 every year. Two sets of curricula were prescribed, one at state level and one at the national level and the schools were recommended to experiment with the curriculum. It also proposed that three or four text books to be prescribed for each subject and moral and religious education be made a part of the curriculum. The curriculum prescribed by the commission was:

Lower primary level (1 to 4)

- One language (regional)
- Mathematical studies
- Environmental studies
- Creative studies
- Health studies
- Work experience

Higher primary level (5 to 8)

- Two languages (one regional and one national) and preferably a third language
- Mathematical studies
- Science studies
- Social studies
- Art
- Physical education
- Work experience
- Moral studies

Lower secondary level (IX and X)

- Three languages
- Mathematical studies
- Science studies
- Social studies
- Art
- Physical education
- Work experience
- Moral studies

Higher secondary level (XI and XII)

- Two languages (one modern Indian language and one classical or foreign language)
- Any three subjects from (a) one additional language, (b) History (c) Economics (d) Logic (e) geography (f) psychology (g) sociology (h) art (i) physics (j) chemistry (k) mathematics (l) biology (m) geology (n) home science
- Art
- Physical education
- Work experience
- Moral studies

It also recommended the establishment of guidance and counselling centres and a new approach in the evaluation of student performances. The commission suggested the neighbourhood school system without social or religious segregation and a school complex system integrating primary and secondary levels of education. It put forward the suggestion that state and national boards of examination be set up and state level evaluation machinery be put in place.

The commission recommended the establishment of Indian Education Service, along the lines of Indian Administrative Service, to bring in professional management to education sector. It proposed standardization and revision of the pay scales of the teaching, non teaching and administrative staff and prescribed minimum pay levels based on their locations. It also advised standardization of pay scales working under different managements such as government, private and local bodies. The minimum scale was suggested to be in the ratio of 1:2:3 for teachers in the primary, secondary and higher levels of educational sector. Another proposal was for the establishment of a machinery for continuous on job training of the teaching staff and for efforts to raise the status of the teachers to attract talents into the profession. It urged laws to be passed to legalize the educational standards and the educational expenditure to be raised from the then level of 2.9 percent of the GDP to 6 percent, to be achieved by the fiscal year, 1985–86. A significant suggestion was the issuance of a National Policy on Education by the Government of India which should serve as a guideline for the state and local bodies in the design and implementation of their educational plans.

There were 23 recommendations of Kothari Commission:-

1.Defects in the existing system of education according to Indian education commission.

2.Aims of education according to Indian education commission.

3.Recommendation of Indian education commission on Educational structures and standards.

4.Recommendation of Indian education commission on Curriculum.

5.Recommendation of Indian education commission on Textbook.

6.Recommendation of Indian education commission on Methods of teaching.

7.Recommendation of Indian education commission on Guidance and counselling.

8.Recommendation of Indian education commission Regarding problems of supervision and inspection.

9.Recommendation of Indian education commission on Problems of administration.

10.Recommendation of Indian education commission on Physical welfare of students.

11.Recommendation of Indian education commission on Evaluation.

12.Recommendation of Indian education commission on Adult education.

13.Recommendation of Indian education commission on Teacher education.

14.Recommendation of Indian education commission on Three (3) language formula.

15.Recommendation on Moral and religion education

16.Recommendation on Education of women.

17.Recommendation on vocational Education.

18. Recommendation on Work experience.

19.Recommendation on Distance Education.

20. Recommendation on Aims objectives and functions of university.

21. Recommendation on Enrollment in Higher Education.

22.Recommendation on Selective Admission.

23.Recommendation on University Autonomy.

=== Aftermath ===
Formulation of a National Policy on Education was one of the important recommendations of the commission and in 1968, the fourth Lok Sabha elected to office in 1967 under the leadership of Indira Gandhi, passed the bill. The policy covered many recommendations of the Kothari Commission such as free and compulsory education, Status and pay scale revision of teachers, equalization of educational opportunity and science education.

Another recommendation of the commission for the alignment of the educational system on 10+2+3 pattern has been achieved by the government on a national level. The education has been modeled as per commission's recommendation to stratify the sector with state and national bodies and a central board, Board of Higher Secondary Education was set up in 1986.

Kothari commission, fourth education commission in the independent India, and its recommendations are also reported to have influenced the 1986 revision of the National Policy on Education by the Rajiv Gandhi ministry. The guidelines laid out by the commission were revisited by the National Knowledge Commission headed by Sam Pitroda in 2005.

== See also ==
- List of Indian commissions
- National Policy on Education
- National Knowledge Commission
- Rashtriya Madhyamik Shiksha Abhiyan
- Rashtriya Uchchatar Shiksha Abhiyan
- Saakshar Bharat
- Daulat Singh Kothari
- J. P. Naik
- M. V. Mathur
- Benjamin Peary Pal
- Roger Revelle
- Atmaram Bhairav Joshi
