= Daulat Singh Kothari =

Indian physicist (1906–1993)

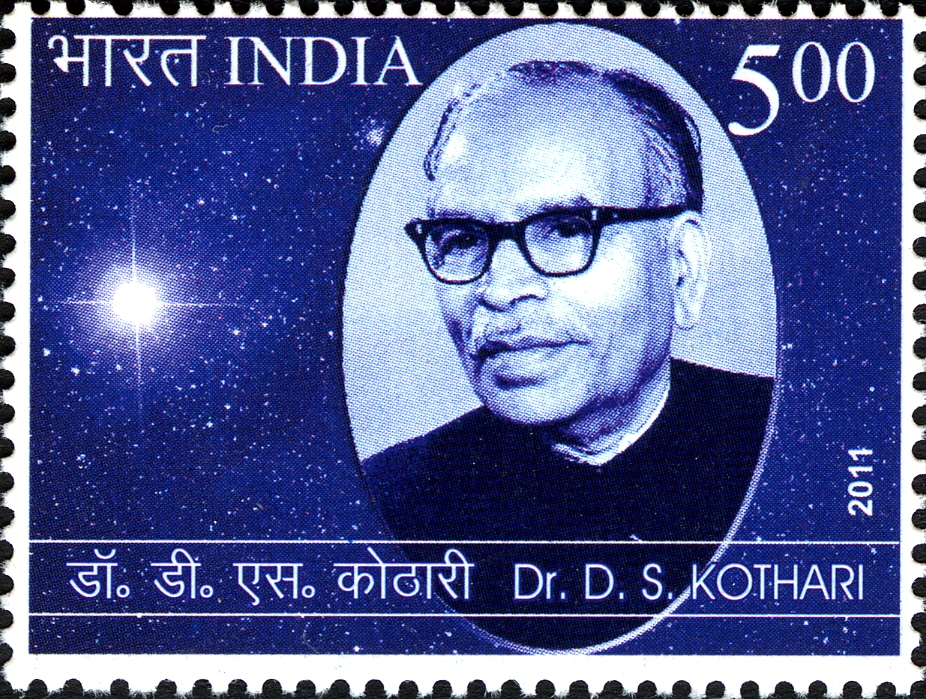
- Kothari on a 2011 stamp of India

1st Director General of Defence Research and Development Organisation (DRDO)
- In office 1958-1961
- Preceded by: Office Established
- Succeeded by: Suri Bhagavantam

Chairman University Grants Commission
- In office 1961-1973

Personal details
- Born: 6 July 1906 Udaipur, Rajasthan, India
- Died: 4 February 1993 (aged 86) Jaipur, India
- Spouse: Sujan Kunwar
- Education: Allahabad University; Cambridge University
- Profession: physicist, educator and educationist
- Known for: Statistical thermodynamics; Theory of White dwarfs; Kothari Commission
- Awards: Padma Bhushan (1962); Padma Vibhushan (1973)

Daulat Singh Kothari (6 July 1906 – 4 February 1993), commonly referred to as D. S. Kothari was an Indian physicist, educator and educationist. He taught Physics at Allahabad University (1928-34), Delhi University (1934-71) and later remained Professor Emeritus at the University. He was the first Scientific Adviser to the Ministry of Defence (1948 - 1961), and instrumental in the formation of the Defence Science Organisation (DSO) in 1949, which established Defence research labs across India. DSO later, became the nucleus of Defence Research and Development Organisation (DRDO), which was formed in 1958, with Kothari as its first Director General. Thereafter, he remained the chairman of the University Grants Commission from 1961 to 1973. He was also the chairman of Kothari Commission (1964-66) set up for the modernisation and standardisation of education in India. He played an important role in the establishment of UGC, NCERT and the defence education system in India.

He served as President of the Indian National Science Academy (1973-74) and Indian Science Congress Association (1964). He was awarded the Padma Bhushan in 1962 and the Padma Vibhushan, the second-highest civilian award by the Government of India, in 1973.

== Early life and education ==
Daulat Singh Kothari was born in the princely state of Udaipur in Rajputana on 6 July 1906 in a Jain family. Eldest of five children, Kothari was the son of Fateh Lal Kothari and Lahar Bai (née Ordia). His father was a schoolteacher who later served as headmaster of government schools at Bhilwara and Udaipur. At age 38, he died in the plague epidemic of 1918, and thereafter Kothari was raised by his mother. His only sister also died at a young age. He had his early education at Udaipur. Following his father's death, family friend Siremal Bapna, then Prime Minister of Indore State, invited Kothari to live with his family in Indore and continue his education. Thus, he matriculated from Maharaja Shivajirao High School, Indore, in 1922, and passed the Rajputana Board Intermediate examination in 1924, in which he secured distinctions in physics, chemistry and mathematics. This earned him a scholarship of ₹50 per month for higher studies, enabling him to attend Allahabad University, where he completed his B.Sc. in 1926. Next, he received a master's degree in physics with specialisation in wireless technology, from the University in 1928 under guidance of Meghnad Saha.

Kothari went to Cavendish Laboratory on a U.P. Government fellowship in 1930 and worked with Ernest Rutherford, P. Kapitsa, and R. H. Fowler. He was awarded a PhD from Cambridge University in May 1933 with a thesis entitled "The quantum statistics of dense matter" and he published in the Proceedings of the Royal Society, London.

== Career ==
After his return to India, he worked at Delhi University from 1934 to 1961 in various capacities as a reader, professor and Head of the Department of Physics. In July 1948, Kothari was appointed the first Scientific Adviser to the Ministry of Defence, Govt. of India, a position he held till 1961. However, he continued to live on the Delhi University campus and take classes. During this period, he recruited scientists from Indian universities in disciplines like physics, electronics, chemistry, mathematics, nutrition and psychology to organise the Defence Science Organisation in 1949. This later became a nucleus for the Defence Research and Development Organisation (DRDO), established in 1958, where he became its founding Director General. During this period, he initiated research programmes in several scientific areas, most of which grew into independent DRDO laboratories, including Naval Dockyard Laboratory (later renamed Naval Materials Research Laboratory), Mumbai, Naval Physical and Oceanographic Laboratory, Kochi, Centre for Fire Research, Delhi, Solid State Physics Laboratory, Delhi, Defence Food Research Laboratory (DFRL), Mysore, Defence Institute of Physiology and Allied Sciences, Chennai, Directorate of Psychological Research, New Delhi, Defence Electronics Research Laboratory, Hyderabad, Scientific Analysis Group, Delhi, Terminal Ballistics Research Laboratory, Chandigarh. Thus, he is considered the Architect of Defence Science in India.

He played a crucial role in the setting up of UGC and NCERT. Kothari and Dr. Patrick Blackett worked together in Cavendish Laboratory, Cambridge University, under the guidance of Ernst Rutherford, the Father of Nuclear Physics; later, together they shaped the defence education system in India.

In 1961, he was appointed as chairman of the University Grants Commission, where he worked till 1973. He was the chairman of the Indian Education Commission of 1964–66, popularly known as Kothari Commission, which was the first ad hoc commission set up in India for the modernisation and standardisation of education in India.

== Personal life ==
Kothari married Sujan Kunwar (née Surana) in January 1925. The couple had three sons; the eldest son, L. S. Kothari, became a professor of physics at the University of Delhi; L. K. Kothari became a professor of physiology at R. N. T. Medical College, Udaipur; and Jeewan Kothari served as a senior architect in the Central Public Works Department.

Kothari died in his sleep on 4 February 1993, aged 86, at Jaipur. Declining health had limited his ability to teach during the last decade of his life; nevertheless, he remained intellectually active until his death.

== Achievements and honours ==
D. S. Kothari was president of the Indian Science Congress at its golden jubilee session in 1963. He was elected President of Indian National Science Academy in 1973. His research on statistical thermodynamics and his Theory of White Dwarf Stars gave him an international reputation.

The Padma Bhushan was conferred on him in 1962, and the Padma Vibhushan in 1973. He was also listed as a "Proud Past Alumni" by the "Allahabad University Alumni Association. In 2011, the Department of Posts issued a commemorative stamp in his honour. He was conferred Atmaram Award in 1990 by the Central Hindi Directorate, Ministry of Human Resource Development.

== Legacy ==
In Kothari's honour, the University of Delhi established the D. S. Kothari Centre for Science, Ethics and Education and organises the D. S. Kothari Memorial Lecture; the first lecture was delivered by Nobel laureate John Kendrew on 18 November 1995. The United Service Institution of India established the Professor Daulat Singh Kothari DRDO Chair of Excellence in 1996, sponsored by the DRDO, while the University Grants Commission introduced the Dr. D. S. Kothari Post-Doctoral Fellowships in 2008–09 and the Dr. Daulat Singh Kothari Institute for Research and Education was established at Udaipur in 2020.

In 1997, the University of Delhi established the D. S. Kothari Hostel in its North Campus in his memory. The hostel accommodates postgraduate male students and research scholars. The California Institute of Technology established the D. S. Kothari Prize in Physics in 1998. Endowed by Kothari's grandson, physicist Vineer Bhansali, also a Caltech) graduate. The prize is awarded annually to an outstanding graduating physics student. On 6 July 2011, the Department of Posts issued a ₹5 commemorative postage stamp marking his 105th birth anniversary.

== Bibliography ==
- Kothari, D. S. (1956). Nuclear Explosions and Their Effects. New Delhi: Publications Division, Ministry of Information and Broadcasting, Government of India. Revised edition:1958.
- Kothari, D. S. (1963). विज्ञान और विश्वविद्यालय [Science and the University] (in Hindi). Agra.
- Kothari, D. S. (1961). The Problem of Scientific and Technical Terminology in Indian Languages. New Delhi: Ministry of Education, Government of India.
- Kothari, D. S. (1970). Education, Science, and National Development. Dadabhai Naoroji Memorial Prize Fund Lectures. Bombay: Asia Publishing House. ISBN 9780210222256.
- Kothari, D. S. (1975). Science and Man. New Delhi: Indiana Publication.
- Kothari, D. S. (1977). Some Thoughts on Science and Religion. New Delhi: Shri Raj Krishan Jain Charitable Trust.
- Kothari, D. S. (1983). Atom and Self: Meghnad Saha Medal Lecture 1978. Bombay: Bharatiya Vidya Bhavan.
- Education Commission (1966). Education and National Development: Report of the Education Commission, 1964–66 (Report). Chairman: D. S. Kothari. New Delhi: Ministry of Education, Government of India.
- Kothari, D. S. (2000). Ahmed, Feroz (ed.). Education and Character Building: Collection of Convocation Addresses (1962–1983) Delivered by Prof. D. S. Kothari. New Delhi: National Institute of Science Communication, Council of Scientific and Industrial Research. ISBN 9788172362096.
- Kothari, D. S. (2002). Ahmed, Feroz (ed.). Atom and Self: Collection of Lectures Delivered by D. S. Kothari. New Delhi: New Age International.
- Kothari, D. S. (2002). Ahmed, Feroz (ed.). Knowledge and Wisdom: Collection of Lectures and Addresses Delivered by D. S. Kothari. New Delhi: New Age International.
- Kothari, D. S. (2004). Ahmed, Feroz (ed.). Science and Humanism: Collection of Articles, Addresses and Speeches Delivered by D. S. Kothari. New Delhi: Galgotia Publications.

=== Books on Kothari and his work ===
- Mehrotra, R. C.; Arora, Ramesh K., eds. (1994). Education, Science and Human Values: Essays in Honour of Professor D. S. Kothari. New Delhi: Wiley Eastern. ISBN 9788122406146.
- Chaudhary, Dhanraj (2002). कीर्ति पुरुष [Kirti Purush: A Novel Based on the Biography of Padma Vibhushan Professor D. S. Kothari] (in Hindi). New Delhi: Vani Prakashan. ISBN 9788170551492.
- Gangrade, K. D.; Kothari, L. S.; Verma, Ajit Ram (2005). Concept of Truth in Science and Religion. New Delhi: Concept Publishing Company. ISBN 9788180691904.
- Kothari, Lalit K.; Arora, Ramesh K., eds. (2006). Vision and Values: Science, Defence, Education, Ethics: Essays in Honour of Dr. D. S. Kothari on His Birth Centenary. New Delhi: Paragon International Publishers. ISBN 8189253301.
- Ahmed, Feroz; Garg, Suresh (2007). Forty Years of Kothari Commission: Reforms and Reflections. New Delhi: Viva Books. ISBN 9788130904153.

=== Biographical memoirs and profiles ===
- Kothari Deepika, Sunahari Smratiyan Dr D S Kothari (Hindi), National Book Trust, New Delhi 2010, Third Print 2019 pages 154, ISBN 978-81-237-5851-0|
- Verma, A. R.; Lal, Krishan; Kothari, L. S. (1993). "Daulat Singh Kothari (1906–1993)". Biographical Memoirs of Fellows of the Indian National Science Academy (PDF). Vol. 21. New Delhi: Indian National Science Academy. pp. 1–55.
- Panchapakesan, N. (10 April 1993). "A superb teacher-learner: An obituary of D. S. Kothari (1906–1993)". Current Science. 64 (7): 528.
- Nagaratnam, A.; Venkatesan, N. S. (July 1994). "Professor D. S. Kothari: A Profile". Defence Science Journal. 44 (3): 189–192. doi:10.14429/dsj.44.4167.
- Venkatesan, N. S.; Nagaratnam, A. (July 1994). "Professor D. S. Kothari: The Architect of Defence Science in India". Defence Science Journal. 44 (3): 193–198. doi:10.14429/dsj.44.4168.
- Panchapakesan, N. (July 1994). "D. S. Kothari and Delhi University". Defence Science Journal. 44 (3): 199–202. doi:10.14429/dsj.44.4169.
- Kirpal, Prem (July 1994). "Remembering Daulat Singh Kothari". Defence Science Journal. 44 (3): 203–205. doi:10.14429/dsj.44.4170.
- Virk, Hardev Singh (2019). "Professor Daulat Singh Kothari: An Amalgam of Science and Spirituality". OmniScience: A Multi-disciplinary Journal. 9 (1): 1–7. doi:10.37591/.v9i1.1564.
- Roy, Amit (September 2020). "Daulat Singh Kothari (1906–1993): Scientist, Teacher, Administrator and Humanist". Resonance. 25 (9): 1179–1184. doi:10.1007/s12045-020-1037-4.
