= Rashtriya Uchchatar Shiksha Abhiyan =

Higher education policy in India

Rashtriya Uchchattar Shiksha Abhiyan (RUSA) (Hindi for "National Higher Education Mission") is a holistic scheme of development for higher education in India initiated in 2013 by the Ministry of Education, Government of India. The centrally sponsored scheme aims at providing strategic funding to higher educational institutions throughout the country. Funding is provided by the central ministry through the state governments and union territories (UT), which in coordination with the central Project Appraisal Board will monitor the academic, administrative and financial advancements taken under the scheme. A total of 316 state public universities and 13,024 colleges will be covered under it.

== Background ==
Innovative educational policies in India have been a huge success. Sarva Shiksha Abhiyan (SSA) launched in 2001 for elementary education and Rashtriya Madhyamik Shiksha Abhiyan (RMSA) launched in 2009 for secondary education produced great results in the educational developments. For higher education University Grants Commission (UGC) has a provision for routine innovation and development fundings. UGC funds are quite adequate for centrally funded universities and colleges, which are recognised under sections 12B and 2(f) of UGC Act. However, as of 31 March 2012 statistics, the higher education sector in India consisted of 574 universities and 35,539 colleges, out of which 214 universities are not covered under 12B of UGC Act, and only 6,787 colleges are registered under 12B and 2(f). Thus a larger number of higher institutes run by state governments, which are limited in their own management, are not provided with sufficient financial support to enhance their facilities for educational reforms. Therefore, a separate scheme for state/UT-managed universities and colleges was proposed by the National Development Council (NDC) as part of the 12th Five-Year Plan in 2012. The Cabinet Committee on Economic Affairs approved it in October 2013.

== Objectives ==
RUSA aims to provide equal development to all higher institutions and rectify weaknesses in the higher education system. Its target achievement is to raise the gross enrolment ratio to 32% by the end of XII Plan in 2017. The major objectives are to:

1. improve the overall quality of existing state institutions by ensuring that all institutions conform to prescribed norms and standards and adopt accreditation as a mandatory quality assurance framework.
2. usher transformative reforms in the state higher education system by creating a facilitating institutional structure for planning and monitoring at the state level, promoting autonomy in state universities and improving governance in institutions.
3. ensure academic and examination reforms in the higher educational institutions.
4. enable conversion of some of the universities into research universities at par with the best in the world.
5. create opportunities for states to undertake reforms in the affiliation system in order to ensure that the reforms and resource requirements of affiliated colleges are adequately met.
6. ensure adequate availability of quality faculty in all higher educational institutions and ensure capacity building at all levels of employment.
7. create an enabling atmosphere in the higher educational institutions to devote themselves to research and innovations.
8. expand the institutional base by creating additional capacity in existing institutions and establishing new institutions, in order to achieve enrolment targets.
9. correct regional imbalances in access to higher education by facilitating access to high quality institutions in urban and semi-urban areas, creating opportunities for students from rural areas to get access to better quality institutions and setting up institutions in un-served and underserved areas.
10. improve equity in higher education by providing adequate opportunities of higher education to SC/STs and socially and educationally backward classes; promote inclusion of women, minorities, and differently abled persons.

== Funding process ==
RUSA is provided by the central Ministry of Human Resource Development directly to the state and UT governments. From the state/UT budget the funds are disbursed to individual institutions.

The funding to states would be made on the basis of critical appraisal of state plans for higher education plans.

The amount of funding from central government will be 60% of the total grants, and 40% will be contributed by the state/UT as matching share. For northeastern states, Sikkim, Jammu and Kashmir, and Uttarakhand the matching share is waived to 10%.

During the 12th Five-Year Plan period between 2012 and 2017, RUSA is allotted a financial outlay of INR 228.55 billion, of which INR 162.27 billion will be contributed by the central government.

During the first phase, 80 new universities would be created by converting autonomous colleges/colleges in a cluster to state universities. 100 new colleges would be set up and 54 existing colleges would be converted into model degree colleges.

Infrastructure grants would be given to 150 universities and 3,500 colleges to upgrade and fill critical gaps in infrastructure especially libraries, laboratories, etc. Further additional 5,000 faculty positions would be supported. Then the scheme will extend into the 13th Five-Year Plan.

== See also ==
- Education in India
- Vocational education in India
- Ministry of Skill Development and Entrepreneurship
- National Policy on Education
- National qualifications framework
- National Skills Qualification Framework (NSQF)
- Skill India
- University Grants Commission (India)
