= Subramanian Ramadorai =

Indian businessman

S Ramadorai
- Born: 6 October 1944 (age 81); Nagpur, British India
- Education: Hansraj College, University of Delhi; Indian Institute of Science; University of California, Los Angeles; MIT Sloan School of Management
- Occupations: Chairperson, Karmayogi Bharat; Honorary Consul, Consulate of Uruguay in India; Chairperson National Institute of Advanced Studies; Chairperson Kalakshetra Foundation
- Known for: Former CEO and MD of Tata Consultancy Services, Former Chairperson of NSDC and NSDA
- Spouse: Mahalakshmi Ramadorai
- Children: 1
- Awards: Padma Bhushan; CBE; Assam Saurabh, 2025

Subramanian Ramadorai (born 6 October 1944) is an Indian executive who was former CEO and MD of Tata Consultancy Services. He was also the Adviser to the Prime Minister of India in the National Council on Skill Development, Government of India. He held the rank equivalent to an Indian Cabinet Minister and was the Chairman of National Skill Development Agency (NSDA) and the National Skill Development Corporation (NSDC). As the Chairman of NSDA/NSDC, he initiated the process of standardization of skilling effort, quality benchmarking, inclusive collaboration, and commonality of purpose and outcomes in India by leveraging technology. Currently, he is the Chairperson of Mission ‘Karmayogi Bharat’, the National Programme for Civil Services Capacity Building (NPCSCB) that aims to transform Indian bureaucracy and prepare civil servants for the future, through comprehensive reform of the capacity building apparatus at individual, institutional and process levels.

He is the chairperson of the advisory board at Tata STRIVE, which is the Tata Group’s CSR skill development initiative aimed towards skilling of the youth for employment, entrepreneurship and community enterprise.

He has been the CEO and MD of Tata Consultancy Services from 1996 to 2009 and Vice - Chairman of Tata Consultancy Services till 6 October 2014. His role has been instrumental in the growth story of TCS, where the company grew from a US$400 million revenues company with 6000 employees to one of the world's largest software and services company with more than 200,000 employees working in 42 countries and revenues over US$20.0 billion.

His current engagements include Chairperson – Kalakshetra Foundation, Chairperson – National Institute of Advanced Studies (NIAS), Chairperson – PRS Legislative Research, Chairperson – Indian National Association for the Club of Rome, Chairperson – Public Health Foundation of India, Chairperson – Indian Institute of Information Technology Guwahati, Trustee – Council on Energy, Environment And Water (CEEW), President – Society for Rehabilitation of Crippled Children (SRCC), Vice Chair – The Nature Conservancy India.

== Early life and education ==
S Ramadorai was born in Nagpur, India, on 6 October 1944 and his family is from Tamil Nadu. His father was a civil servant who served as the Accountant General in Tamil Nadu State Government while his mother was a homemaker. Ramadorai was the fourth of five children in the family and his ancestors hailed from Thanjavur.

Ramadorai started his schooling at DTEA and completed Higher Secondary education from Sardar Patel Vidyalaya in Delhi. He holds a bachelor's degree in Physics from Hansraj College, Delhi University, a Bachelor of Engineering degree in Electronics and Telecommunications and a Master of Science degree in Computer Science from the University of California, Los Angeles. In 1993, Ramadorai attended the Senior Executive Development Program at the MIT Sloan School of Management.

== Career ==
Beginning his career with TCS as a Junior Engineer in 1972, he rose through the ranks and eventually was given the responsibility to set up TCS's operations in the United States in 1979 in New York. Since taking on the role of CEO, he contributed towards efforts that helped TCS build new relationships with large corporations and academic institutions, venture into innovative IT services and products, and intensify the company's research and development activities. Ramadorai also initiated TCS's quality journey through initiatives that took sixteen of its Development Centers to SEI's CMMI Level 5. TCS also attained the distinction of being the World's first company to have all Centres assessed as operating at Level 5 of PCMM (People Capability Maturity Model, People-CMM). He resigned as vice-chairman of TCS on 6 October 2014.

He was the Chairperson of Bombay Stock Exchange (BSE), Tata Elxsi, He served as the Chairperson of AirAsia India. He was the Chairperson of the Governing Board of the Tata Institute of Social Sciences. He was also the Chairperson of Tata Technologies Ltd., where he led the modernization of several ITIs in the country.

== Awards and recognitions ==
Ramadorai is a Fellow of the Indian National Academy of Engineering, Fellow of the Institute of Electrical and Electronics Engineers (IEEE), Member of the National Council of the Confederation of Indian Industry (CII), Honorary Member of the Indo-American Society, Member of the Executive Education Advisory Board of Marshall School of Business (USC).

In 2001, Ramadorai received the Lifetime Achievement Award from the Indore Management Association and he was honoured with CNBC Asia Pacific's prestigious 'Asia Business Leader of the Year' Award in 2002. The same year, he was named by Consulting Magazine (USA) as being one of the Top 25 Most Influential Consultants in the world.

In 2004, he was awarded Business India's "Business Man of the Year" award. He was also awarded the Distinguished Achievement Award from the Indian Institute of Science, Bangalore, and a Fellowship of the Institute of Management Consultants of India, as well as the 'Management Man of the Year' award by the Bombay Management Association.

In 2006, on India's Republic Day, he was awarded the Padma Bhushan, India's third highest civilian honour.

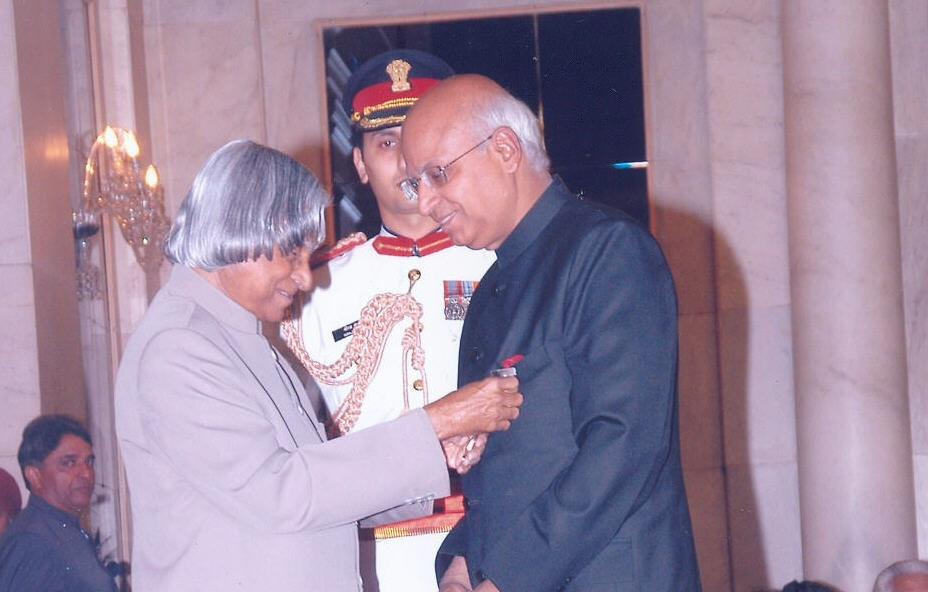
The President, Dr A. P. J. Abdul Kalam presenting Padma Bhushan to Shri S Ramadorai on 26 January 2006, in recognition of his commitment and dedication to the IT industry.

On 28 April 2009, Ramadorai was awarded the Commander of the Order of the British Empire (CBE).

On 31 January 2011, TCS Vice-chairman, Ramadorai was appointed by the Indian Government as the Advisor to Prime Minister Dr. Manmohan Singh for the National Skill Development Council. He was awarded the Lifetime Achievement Award at ET Awards 2015 for his contribution in shaping TCS. In 2016, he was presented the prestigious ‘Outstanding Institutional Builder’ Award of the All India Management Association (AIMA)’s Managing India Awards.

On 16 February 2023, Deakin University, Australia, recognized his distinguished lifetime achievement as a business leader, and conferred upon him the Honorary Doctorate for his extensive contributions to the IT industry and his commitment to technological innovation for positive social outcomes. In the past, he had been conferred with a Doctor of Sciences Degree (honoris causa) by Sastra University in 2006 and Doctorate (honoris causa) by Anna University.

== Books authored ==
On 16 September 2011, his book The TCS Story... and Beyond was published by Penguin India, covering his time at Tata Consultancy Services.

On 4 March 2022, TCS - Oru Vetri Kathai, the Tamil translation of his book The TCS Story... and Beyond was launched.

== Philanthropy ==
He is the President of the Society for Rehabilitation of Crippled Children (SRCC) – a one-of-its-kind super speciality children's hospital in Mumbai. He is the Chairperson of the Axis Bank Foundation where the focus is on livelihood initiatives and community-centric work. He is also the Chairperson of the British Asian India Foundation that focuses on delivering programs to help tackle poverty and inequality in South Asia.

He is the Chairman of the Governing Body of Sahapedia, a free-to-access digital library of India's heritage and culture, and offers digital content in multimedia formats—articles and books, photo essays and video, interviews and oral histories, maps and timelines, authored by scholars and curated by experts.

He and his wife Mala Ramadorai are also the founders of Anwesha Trust that supports several initiatives in Sengalipuram and other areas of rural Tamil Nadu.
