= Girish R Gowda =

Indian kickboxer and cancer survivor (born 1986)

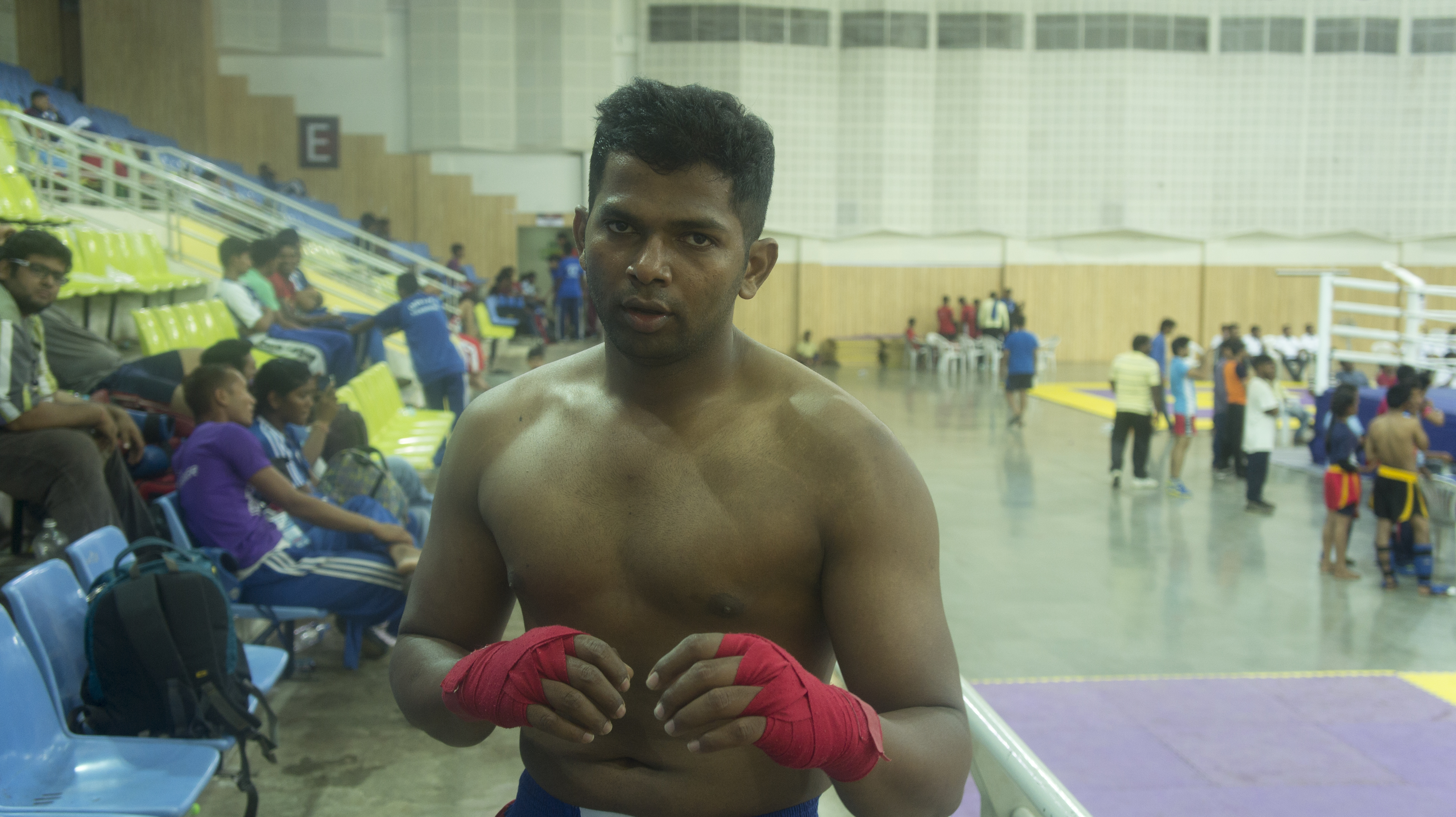
- Born: 9 February 1986 (age 40); Bangalore, Karnataka
- Education: GSPK Bangalore; ITI Bangalore
- Known for: Kickboxer
- Style: Martial Arts

Girish R. Gowda (born 9 February 1986) is an Indian kickboxer. Ten months after being diagnosed with blood cancer, Gowda returned to competition against medical advice and won a gold medal at the WAKO India Kickboxing Federation National Championship in New Delhi in January 2018.

== Biography ==
Girish R. Gowda was born on 9 February 1986 in Bangalore to Ramachandra and Bhagyamma. He was the only son in a family of five children, alongside four sisters. Gowda's father died when he was 12 years old. He completed his schooling at GSPK and subsequently enrolled at an Industrial Training Institute (ITI) to study welding. At age 18, Gowda began working as a delivery driver for Horlicks.

== Early life and career ==
At age 19, Girish R. Gowda transitioned from a desire for personal retaliation following a public altercation to disciplined martial arts training, eventually earning a black belt in karate and competing professionally. Despite initial maternal opposition, he secretly pursued boxing and karate alongside his employment before advancing to district, state, national, and international competition levels.

== Professional achievements ==
- Silver medal (light heavyweight category), WAKO Asian Kickboxing Championships, Pune (2015)
- Top 16 finish, WAKO World Kickboxing Championships (2015)
- Gold medal (81 kg category), National Federation Cup, New Delhi (January 2018)

== Awards and honors ==
- Best Kickboxing Athlete of the Year, GT World Summit (2019)
