= Vandana Luthra =

Indian entrepreneur

- Born: July 12, 1959 (age 67); India
- Occupation: Entrepreneur
- Title: Founder, VLCC
- Spouse: Mukesh Luthra (m. 1980)
- Children: Two daughters (Pallavi Luthra, Meera Bhatia)
- Awards: Padma Shri; Woman Entrepreneur Award; FICCI Successful Business Woman Award; Amity Woman Achievers Award; Outstanding Business Woman Award; Rajiv Gandhi Women Achiever Award
- Website: Official website of VLCC

Vandana Luthra (born 12 July 1959) is an Indian entrepreneur and the founder of VLCC Health Care Ltd, a beauty and wellness company with operations in Asia, the GCC countries, and Africa.

== Early life and education ==
Vandana Luthra was born in New Delhi in 1959. Her father was a mechanical engineer and her mother was an Ayurvedic doctor who ran a charitable initiative called Amar Jyoti. This inspired her to make a difference in people’s lives. After completing her graduation from the Polytechnic for Women in New Delhi, she went to Europe to gain expertise in beauty, food and nutrition, and skin care.

== Career ==
Vandana Luthra started VLCC in 1989 as a chain of beauty and wellness centres headquartered in New Delhi.

In 2014, Luthra was appointed the first chairperson of the Beauty & Wellness Sector Skill Council (B&WSSC).. The council provides training under the Government of India's Pradhan Mantri Kaushal Vikas Yojana schemes.

== Philanthropy ==
Luthra is Vice Chairperson of the NGO Khushii, which operates telemedicine centres, a remedial school, and a vocational training facility. She is also a member of the Morarji Desai National Institute of Yoga and serves on the Steering Committee and Sub-Committee formed by India’s Ministry of Skill Development & Entrepreneurship under the Pradhan Mantri Kaushal Vikas Yojana.

She is a patron of the Amar Jyoti Charitable Trust, which pioneered the concept of educating children with and without disabilities together in equal numbers from nursery to class VIII. The trust operates two schools.

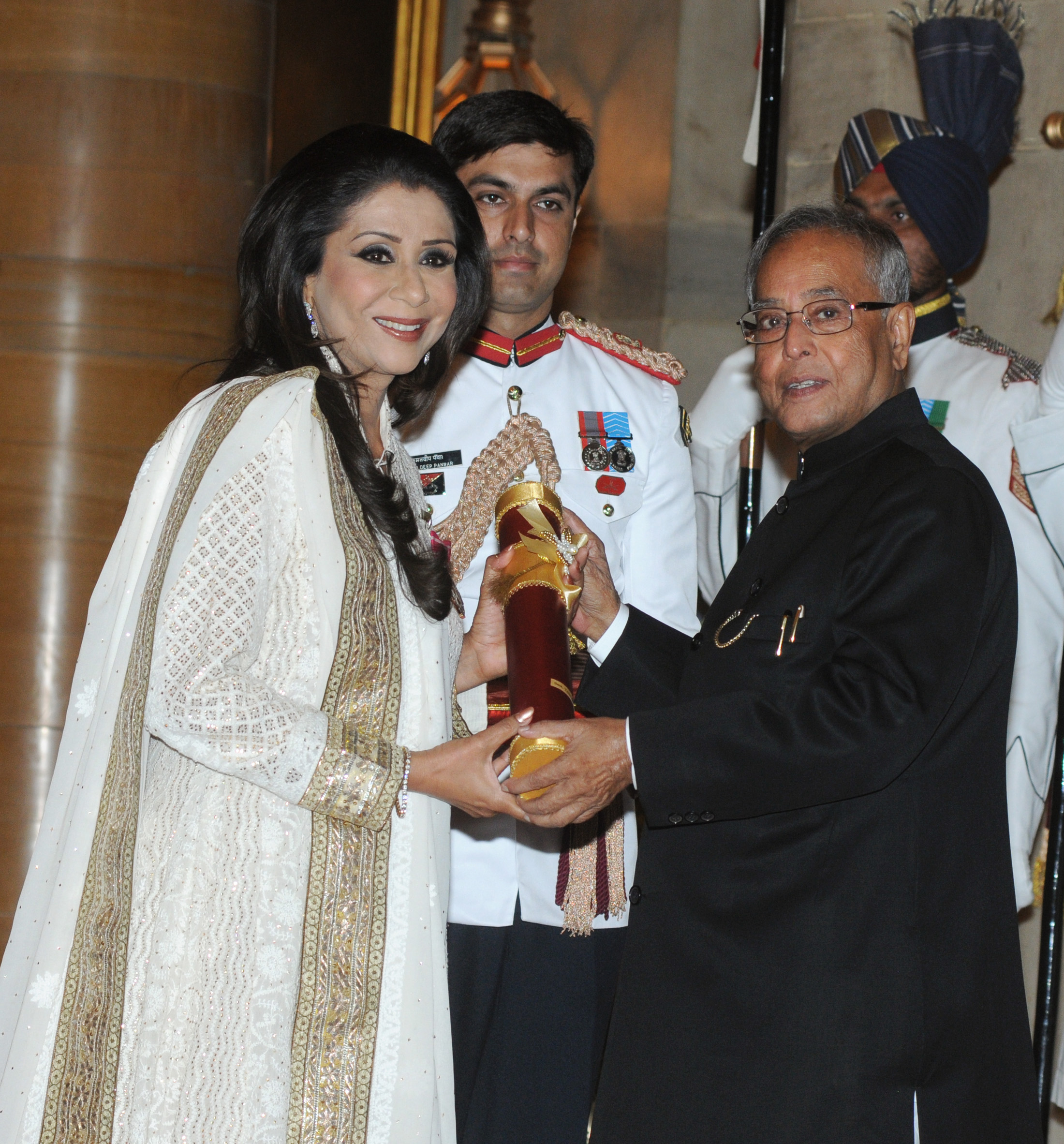
The President, Shri Pranab Mukherjee presenting the Padma Shri Award to Vandana Luthra at an investiture ceremony at Rashtrapati Bhavan, New Delhi on 5 April 2013

== Awards and recognitions ==
- Padma Shri (India’s fourth-highest civilian honour) in 2013 for her contribution to trade and industry.
- The Enterprise Asia Women Entrepreneur of the Year Award in 2010.
- In 2016, she was ranked 26th on the ''Forbes Asia'' list of 50 Power Businesswomen in the Asia-Pacific region.
- Featured in Fortune magazine's annual listing of the ‘50 Most Powerful Women in Business in India’ for five consecutive years, from 2011 to 2015.

== Publications ==
- Vandana Luthra (2011). Complete Fitness Programme. Sangam Books. p. 152. ISBN 978-8125906919.
- Vandana Luthra (2013). A Good Life. HarperCollins India. p. 240. ISBN 978-9351160113.
