= Mugaliyachhap =

Mugaliyachhap Mugalia Chaap, Mungalia Chhap, Mungaliya Chhap
- village
- Location within Madhya Pradesh Location within India
- Coordinates: 23.2252084°N 77.2994144°E
- Country: India
- State: Madhya Pradesh
- District: Bhopal
- Tehsil: Huzur
- Elevation: 526 m (1,726 ft)

Population (2011)
  - Total: 3,931
- Time zone: UTC+5:30 (IST)
- ISO 3166 code: MP-IN
- 2011 census code: 462044, 482505

Mugaliyachhap, also called Mungaliya Chhap, is a village in the Bhopal district of Madhya Pradesh, India. It is located in the Huzur tehsil and the Phanda block.

In 2014, the foundation of Deendayal Shramodaya Vidyalaya, a school for children of labourers, was laid in the village. The Chief Minister Shivraj Singh Chouhan also announced that an Industrial Training Institute (ITI) would be set up in the village.

Mugaliyachhap is the second most populous village in the Huzur tehsil. The village has an ancient Hanuman temple, where Ramayana recitation ceremonies have been conducted since 2006. The village is also home to the Jagran Lakecity University.

== Demographics ==
According to the 2011 census of India, Mugaliyachhap has 792 households. The effective literacy rate (i.e. the literacy rate of population excluding children aged 6 and below) is 65.26%.

Demographics (2011 Census)
	Total	Male	Female
Population	3931	1998	1933
Children aged below 6 years	609	313	296
Scheduled caste	909	475	434
Scheduled tribe	12	5	7
Literates	2168	1276	892
Workers (all)	1528	1048	480
Main workers (total)	1173	885	288
Main workers: Cultivators	397	312	85
Main workers: Agricultural labourers	557	377	180
Main workers: Household industry workers	44	41	3
Main workers: Other	175	155	20
Marginal workers (total)	355	163	192
Marginal workers: Cultivators	52	25	27
Marginal workers: Agricultural labourers	224	92	132
Marginal workers: Household industry workers	10	5	5
Marginal workers: Others	69	41	28
Non-workers	2403	950	1453
