= Vidyanjali =

Indian school volunteering programme

- विद्यांजलि
- Country: India
- Prime Minister(s): Narendra Modi
- Ministry: Ministry of Human Resource Development
- Key people: Smriti Irani
- Launched: June, 2016; New Delhi
- Status: active

Vidyanjali is a school volunteer programme and an initiative of the Ministry of Human Resource Development of India to boost community and private sector participation in government schools, launched by Smriti Irani. Under the programme, volunteers, including NRIs, retired teachers, government officials, defence personnel, professionals will offer their services for co-scholastic activities for children from class I to VIII. It is the project launched under the aegis of the Sarva Shiksha Abhiyan by the Department of School Education and Literacy.

The programme being piloted across 19 states and two union territories like Assam, Andhra Pradesh, Bihar, Chhattisgarh, Delhi, Haryana, Himachal Pradesh, Gujarat, Goa, Jammu and Kashmir, Karnataka, Madhya Pradesh, Maharashtra, Manipur, Odisha, Punjab, Rajasthan, Telangana, Tripura, Uttarakhand, Uttar Pradesh and West Bengal.
