= Chitra Naik =

Indian educationist, writer, social worker

- Born: 15 July 1918; Pune, India
- Died: 24 December 2010 (aged 92); Pune, Maharashtra, India
- Occupations: Educationist; Writer; Social worker
- Known for: Educational reforms
- Spouse: Jayant Pandurang Naik
- Awards: Padma Shri; Pranawanand Award; Jeevan Sadhana Award; Karma Veer Bahurao Patil Samaj Seva Award; Tagore Literacy Award; UNESCO Raja Roy Singh Award; Rajiv Gandhi Award; UNESCO Jan Amos Comenius International Award; Jamnalal Bajaj Award
- Website: Website of IIE

Chitra Jayant Naik (15 July 1918 – 24 December 2010) was an Indian educationist, writer, social worker, the chairperson of the Indian Institute of Education and the expert member of the Planning Commission of India. She was the chairperson of the Non-formal Education Committee set up by the Ministry of Human Resource Development and was a member of the National Literacy Mission. The Government of India awarded her the fourth highest Indian civilian honour of Padma Shri in 1986.

== Early life ==
Chitra Naik was born on 15 July 1918 at Pune in the western Indian state of Maharashtra and graduated in arts with honours. She continued her studies to get another graduate degree in education and secured a doctoral degree (PhD) from Mumbai University. In 1953, she received a Fulbright scholarship and did post doctoral studies at Columbia University, New York. Her career started at the Rural Institute in Bhudargad, Kolhapur District where she organised educational camps among the harijans, gathered women to form women's associations (Mahila Mandal) and founded Children's daycare centres (Balwadi) and a health clinic.

== Legacy and positions ==
In 1948, she helped her husband and renowned educationist, Jayant Pandurang Naik, to found the Indian Institute of Education (IIE), a research institute affiliated to Mumbai University, to facilitate higher education and research facilities for the teachers in the Greater Bombay area. Chitra Naik was a collaborator in the endeavours of Jayant Naik, an inductee of the UNESCO Roll of Honour of the 100 significant educational thinkers of the last 25 centuries. She served as the director of IIE and under her leadership, the institution set up training centres for women in the disciplines of home nursing, first aid, maternal and child care, sanitation and nutrition. She also established a Children's Home (Bal Bhavan) and a training centre for social workers, organised education camps on family planning for women and conducted a project study on Mobilising Gram Panchayats for Rural Development.

Naik was the director of National Institute of Basic Education, New Delhi and chaired the Non-formal Education Committee of the Ministry of Human Resource Development. She was a member of the Planning Commission of India and attended to the responsibilities of the General education, Social welfare and Scheduled Caste/Scheduled Tribe as the expert member of the commission for the Ninth Five Year Plan (1997–2002). She was a member of the Working Group on Adult Education (1978–83) under the Ministry of Human Resource Development and a permanent member of the CABE Committee on Decentralised Management of Education (1993) set up by the Central Advisory Board of Education She served as a member of the National Literacy Mission and was involved with the International Institute of Adult and Lifelong Education (IIALE) as a member of its International Consultative Committee. She was in close association with the Government of Maharashtra and served in various capacities as the Director of Maharashtra State Board of Secondary and Higher Secondary Education, Director of Higher Education and Director of Education. Naik is the author of the books, Shikshan ani Samaj (Marathi), Educational innovation in India, and Lokmanya Tilak as Educational Thinker. She has also written many books for children of which four were published by the National Book Trust in fourteen languages.

== Death ==
Naik suffered from heart and lung disease in her later years and was admitted to hospital in December 2010. She died on 24 December 2010 in Pune at the age of 92, survived by her niece, Aruna Giri.

== Awards and honours ==
Chitra Naik was a recipient of the Pranawanand Award for Educational Research of the University Grants Commission and Jeevan Sadhana Award of the University of Pune. The Government of India awarded her the civilian honour Padma Shri in 1986 and she received the first Karma Veer Bahurao Patil Samaj Seva Award in 1989. The Indian Adult Education Association (IAEA) selected her for the Tagore Literacy Award in 1992 and the same year, UNESCO awarded her the Raja Roy Singh Award. This was followed by the Rajiv Gandhi Award for social Service and the UNESCO Jan Amos Comenius International Award and, in 2002, she received the Jamnalal Bajaj Award from the Jamnalal Bajaj Foundation.

== Bibliography ==
- Chitra Naik (1975). "Shikshan ani Samaj". Indian Institute of Education. Archived from the original on 4 March 2016.
- Chitra Naik (1974). Educational innovation in India. UNESCO Press. ASIN B007ESYZWK.
- Chitra Naik (2004). "Lokmanya Tilak as Educational Thinker". Indian Institute of Education. Archived from the original on 4 March 2016.

== See also ==
- Jayant Pandurang Naik
- Planning Commission of India
- National Literacy Mission
- Maharashtra State Board of Secondary and Higher Secondary Education
