= Academy of Applied Arts, New Delhi =

Art school in New Delhi, India

Academy of Applied Arts
- Established: 2010
- Affiliations: National Institute for Entrepreneurship and Small Business Development; Ministry of Skill Development and Entrepreneurship
- Location: New Delhi, India
- Campus: New Delhi
- Website: Official website

Academy of Applied Arts (abbreviated AAA) is a single subject applied arts school specializing in interior design and its faculties. It is Headquartered at New Delhi and was founded in 2010. The Academy of Applied Arts is recognized by the NIESBUD (National Institute for Entrepreneurship and Small Business Development), an autonomous institute under the Ministry of Skill Development and Entrepreneurship, Government of India.

The Academy of Applied Arts offers multiple options for courses in interior design which can be taken online or on campus. The academy has 3 campuses in NCR at Ring Road Lajpat Nagar, YWCA (Dwarka), & Mewar University (Ghaziabad).

== History ==
The institute was established in 2010.

== Courses Offered ==
The institute offers courses both at graduate and postgraduate levels on Campus and Virtual Learning options.

- List of institutions of higher education in Delhi
