= Shalini Moghe =

Indian educator (1914–2011)

- Born: 13 March 1914; Indore, Madhya Pradesh, India
- Died: 30 June 2011 (aged 97); Indore, Madhya Pradesh, India
- Resting place: Rambagh Muktidham, Indore, Madhya Pradesh, India; 22°43′34″N 75°51′33″E
- Other name: Shalini Tai
- Occupations: Educationist, social worker
- Spouse: Dada Saheb Moghe
- Parent: Vinayak Sitaram Sarwate
- Awards: Padma Shri; Jamnalal Bajaj Award; Nai Duniya Nayika Lifetime Achievement Award

Shalini Moghe (1914 - 2011) was an Indian educationist, social worker and the founder of Kasturba Kanya School for tribal children and Bal Niketan Sangh, the first Montessori school in the state of Madhya Pradesh. She was the chairperson of the Bharatiya Grameen Mahila Sangh, Indore, a national level non governmental organization working for the welfare and education of disabled people, orphans, under privileged and the economically weaker sections of the society and was involved with other Indore-based educational institutions such as Prestige Public School and Pragya Girls School. A winner of the Jamnalal Bajaj Award in 1992, she was honoured by the Government of India in 1968, with the award of Padma Shri, the fourth highest Indian civilian award for her contributions to the society.

== Biography ==
Shalini Moghe was born in a middle-class family to Tatya Sarwate, a locally known educationist and a former member of parliament after whom a street in Indore is named, on 13 March 1914 at Indore in the Indian state of Madhya Pradesh. She graduated in Arts (BA) from Karachi, secured a diploma in Montessori education and did advanced training in Juvenile Court and Child Welfare before joining government service. In 1944, she resigned from the job and started a nursery school, the first Montessori school in the city, wholly funded by her personal resources. After three years of operations, she formed an association with like minded people under the name, Bal Niketan Sangh, in 1947 which grew to cover a host of activities such as welfare centres in the city and surrounding villages, creches and rescue home for destitute children, nurseries, integrated child development programmes, medical camps and financial assistance for women.

Moghe started a nursery in a sweepers' colony in 1953, though there was stiff opposition to the project. The state government nominated her as a member of the Madhya Pradesh State Social Welfare Board, placing two districts with large adivasi population, Jhabua and West Nimar, under her care. She utilised this opportunity to spread her activities to these areas and founded Kasturba Kanya School in Jhabua. She also established a toy library, in 1971, where the poor children below the age of ten had access to educational, scientific, mechanical and constructive toys. Her social forestry campaign of 1979 brought young people under one banner and one slogan, One boy one tree. She started several other programmes such as child immunization, baby shows, training on child care, toy making, manufacturing of educational equipment, and spinning.

Under the aegis of Bal Niketan Sangh, she established a BEd college, conducted teachers training programmes for primary teachers, and organised two integrated child development programmes, one at the slums of Indore city and the other at Jabot, the adivasi colony in Jhabua district. Under these programmes, she set up 170 centres which attended to child immunization, prenatal and post natal care for women, child nutrition, health education, hygiene care, preschool training and family planning. A girls' Hostel was another project she started in Jobat which also imparted training in music, yoga, carpet weaving, tailoring, knitting, cooking and healthy living.

Moghe was associated with several government initiatives. She was a member of one of the task forces on pre-primary education under the Kothari Education Commission. She also served a working group set up by the Ministry of Education in 1979 on early education as a member. She was also a member of the reception committee of the International Solar Food Processing Conference 2009.

It is reported that Moghe, popularly known as Shalini Tai (Tai means older sister in Marathi), worked without remuneration for the major part of her career and her earnings were spent for her social activities. She was married to Dada Saheb Moghe, a civil servant and she died 30 June 2011, at the age 98 succumbing to old age illnesses. She was cremated at Rambagh Mukthidam, a crematorium in Indore.

== Awards and honours ==
The Government of India honoured Shalini Moghe with the civilian award of Padma Shri in 1968. She received the Jamnalal Bajaj Award in 1992 for Outstanding Contribution in Development and Welfare of Women and Children and/or Gandhian Constructive Work by Women Workers. She was selected for the Nai Duniya Nayika Lifetime Achievement Award 2010 in 2009. The Government of Madhya Pradesh declared her as one among Pradesh Ki Gauravshali Betiyan (State's Daughters of Pride) on the State Foundation Day on 1 November 2011 as a part of the Beti Bachao Abhiyan (Save the Daughter Campaign).

== See also ==
- Bharatiya Grameen Mahila Sangh
