= Vinayak Sitaram Sarwate =

Indian politician (1884–1972)

- Born: 1884
- Died: 1972 (aged 87–88)
- Children: Shalini Moghe, Nalini Moghe, Dr Malini Harmalkar, Kalindi Sarwate], Vasudev, Vishnu and Vasant Sarwate

Vinayak Sitaram Sarwate (1884-1972) was a Marathi freedom fighter, political leader, and author from Indore. He was appointed Sarsanghchalak of RSS in 1940. He clearly stated his alignment with Congress. He was also the member of Constituent Assembly of India representing the Madhya Bharat state.

He founded with his daughter, Shalini Moghe, "Bal Niketan Sangh", an organization in social service and education.

He was awarded the Padma Bhushan, third highest civilian honour of India by the President of India, in 1966.
