= Atmaram Bhairav Joshi =

Indian agricultural scientist and academic

- Born: 17 November 1916; India
- Died: 3 July 2010 (aged 93); Pune, Maharashtra, India
- Occupation: Agricultural scientist
- Known for: Crop breeding
- Awards: Padma Shri; Norman Borlaug Award; B. D. Tilak Lecture Award

Atmaram Bhairav Joshi (1916 – 2010) was an Indian agricultural scientist and academic, known for his contributions to the field of wheat and other crop breeding. He was the vice-chancellor of Mahatma Phule Krishi Viswavidyalaya, Rahuri and the chairman of the Research Advisory Committee of the Indian Agricultural Research Institute, New Delhi. The Government of India awarded him the fourth highest Indian civilian award of Padma Shri in 1975.

== Biography ==
Born on 17 November 1916, A. B. Joshi graduated (BSc Honours) from Nagpur University in 1937. After securing a post graduate diploma from the Indian Agricultural Research Institute, New Delhi (IARI) in 1939, he passed his MSc in 1945 and PhD in 1950 from the University of Cambridge. His career started in 1940 as a research assistant at his alma mater, IARI, where he rose in ranks to become a professor, the dean of post graduate studies (1958–65) and the director of the institution (1965–66). In 1966, he was posted at the Indian Council for Agricultural Research (ICAR) as the deputy director general, a post he held till 1972 when he returned to IARI as its director. After superannuation in 1977, he was appointed as the vice-chancellor of the Mahatama Phule Krishi Vidyapeeth, Rahuri and worked there till his retirement in 1980. He was also associated with Nimbkar Agricultural Research Institute in the 1980s as an advisor and Principal Investigator of a couple of projects.

Joshi was a member of the Task Force on Agricultural Education of the Kothari Commission (1964–66) set up by the Government of India to advise on general principles and policies for the development of education in India. He was the coordinator of the ICAR sponsored Wheat Research Project (1960–66) During his tenure as the vice-chancellor of the MPKV university, he also served as a member of the Scientific Advisory Committee to the prime minister of India (1972–76). Joshi died on 3 July 2010 at the age of 93, at Pune, in Maharashtra.

== Legacy ==
Joshi is known to have conducted cytogenetic research on a number of crops such as sesame, chickpea, tobacco, and Capsicum and research on the evolutionary origin of Okra (Bhindi) and Panicum maximum (fodder grass). He introduced crop improvement of wheat and cotton through quantitative genic exploitation and is known to have contributed to the success of the Green Revolution in India in the 1960s and 1970s. His researches were published by way of over 300 articles which included many monographs on sesame and cotton. He also guided 45 postgraduate and doctoral students in their research.

The Task Force of Kothari Commission, in which Joshi was a member, is reported to have made several recommendations aimed at developing agricultural education in India. He was a member of the High-Level Committee set up by the Government of India for the establishment of a national centre for plant introduction and germplasm augmentation for use in crop improvement and the National Bureau of Plant Introduction was established in August 1976 on the advice of the committee. The centre was again revamped to establish the present-day National Bureau of Plant Genetic Resources in January 1977. His assistance to M. S. Swaminathan and Benjamin Peary Pal were also reported in the development of the Indian Agricultural Research Institute.

Joshi served the Quintennial Review Team of the International Crops Research Institute for the Semi-Arid Tropics (ICRISAT), Hyderabad as a member and chaired the Research Advisory Committees of the Indian Agricultural Research Institute, the Central Institute for Cotton Research, Nagpur, NABARA, Mumbai and the Agharkar Research Institute, Pune. He headed the Indian Agricultural Universities Association as its president in 1980. He was also associated as a member with several international projects such as the International Team for Improvement of Agricultural Research Organization in Indonesia (1969), the advisory committee of Consultative Group on International Agricultural Research (CGIAR), Washington DC, USA (1973–77) and the World Bank Mission to Tanzania (1979). He was the project manager of the FAO/UNDP project on the improvement of field crop productivity in Egypt and a member of the board of directors of the International Potato Research Institute, Lima (1972–76).

Joshi was the president of the Indian Society of Genetics and Plant Breeding for two terms, in 1962 and 1978. He was the secretary of the Indian National Science Academy from 1973 to 1976. He was the president of the Maharashtra Association for Cultivation of Science and the chairman of the Research Development Committee of the Central Bee Research Institute, Pune as well as the Khadi and Village Industries Commission centre attached to the institution. He also served as the vice-president of the Maharashtra Education Society, Pune.

== Awards and honours ==
Several Indian universities such as G. B. Pant University of Agriculture and Technology, Pantanagar, Indian Agricultural Research Institute, New Delhi, and Vasantrao Naik Marathwada Agricultural University, Parbhani (Maharashtra) awarded him DSc (honoris causa). In 1976, the Government of India awarded him the civilian honour of Padma Shri and he received the Norman Borlaug Award from Coromandel International the same year. The Indian National Science Academy elected him as a fellow in 1961 and selected him for the BD Tilak Award lecture in 1984. He was an elected fellow of the National Academy of Agricultural Sciences, New Delhi Indian Academy of Sciences, Maharashtra Academy of Sciences, Pune, the Indian Botanical Society, and the Indian Society of Genetics and Plant Breeding. The Indian Agricultural Research Institute instituted the AB Joshi Memorial Award in 2002, in his honour and organises an annual lecture under the name, AB Joshi Memorial award lecture.

== See also ==
- Indian Agricultural Research Institute
- Green Revolution in India
