= National Policy on Education =

Policy formulated by the Government of India

The National Policy on Education (NPE) is a policy formulated by the Government of India to promote and regulate education in India. The policy covers elementary education to higher education in both rural and urban India. The first NPE was promulgated by the Government of India by Prime Minister Indira Gandhi in 1968, the second by Prime Minister Rajiv Gandhi in 1986, then the third (revised version of 1986) by Prime Minister P.V. Narasimha Rao in 1992, and the fourth by Prime Minister Narendra Modi in 2020.

== History ==
Since the country's independence in 1947, the Indian government sponsored a variety of programmes to address the problems of illiteracy in both rural and urban India. Maulana Abul Kalam Azad, India's first Minister of Education, envisaged strong central government control over education throughout the country, with a uniform educational system. The Union government established the University Education Commission (1948–1949), the Secondary Education Commission (1952–1953), University Grants Commission and the Kothari Commission (1964–66) to develop proposals to modernise India's education system. The Resolution on Scientific Policy was adopted by the government of Jawaharlal Nehru, India's first Prime Minister. The Nehru government sponsored the development of high-quality scientific education institutions such as the Indian Institutes of Technology. In 1961, the Union government formed the National Council of Educational Research and Training (NCERT) as an autonomous organisation that would advise both the Union and state governments on formulating and implementing education policies.

=== 1968 ===
Based on the recommendations of the Kothari Commission (1964–1966), the government headed by Prime Minister Indira Gandhi announced the first National Policy on Education in 1968, which called for a "radical restructuring" and proposed equal educational opportunities in order to achieve national integration and greater cultural and economic development. The policy called for fulfilling compulsory education for all children up to the age of 14, as stipulated by the Constitution of India and specialized training and qualification of teachers. The policy called for a focus on the learning of regional languages, outlining the "three language formula" to be implemented in secondary education - the instruction of the English language, the official language of the state where the school was based, and Hindi. Language education was seen as essential to reduce the gulf between the intelligentsia and the masses. Although the decision to adopt Hindi as the national language had proven controversial, the policy called for the use and learning of Hindi to be encouraged uniformly to promote a common language for all Indians. The policy also encouraged the teaching of the ancient Sanskrit language, which was considered an essential part of India's culture and heritage. The NPE of 1968 called for education spending to increase to six percent of the national income. As of 2013, the NPE 1968 has moved location on the national website.

=== 1986 ===
In 1986, the government led by Rajiv Gandhi introduced a new National Policy on Education. The policy called for "special emphasis on the removal of disparities and to equalise educational opportunity," especially for Indian women, Scheduled Tribes (ST) and the Scheduled Caste (SC) communities. To achieve such a social integration, the policy called for expanding scholarships, adult education, recruiting more teachers from the SCs, incentives for poor families to send their children to school regularly, development of new institutions and providing housing and services. The NPE called for a "child-centred approach" in primary education, and launched "Operation Blackboard" to improve primary schools nationwide. The policy expanded the open university system with the Indira Gandhi National Open University, which had been created in 1985. The policy also called for the creation of the "rural university" model, based on the philosophy of Mahatma Gandhi, to promote economic and social development at the grassroots level in rural India. 1986 education policy expected to spend 6% of GDP on education.

=== 1992 ===
The 1986 National Policy on Education was modified in 1992 by the P. V. Narasimha Rao government. In 2005, Former Prime Minister Manmohan Singh adopted a new policy based on the "Common Minimum Programme" of his United Progressive Alliance (UPA) government. Programme of Action (PoA) 1992, under the National Policy on Education (NPE), 1986 envisaged to conduct of a common entrance examination on all India basis for admission to professional and technical programmes in the country. For admission to Engineering and Architecture/Planning programmes, Government of India vide Resolution dated 18 October 2001 has laid down a Three – Exam Scheme (JEE and AIEEE at the National Level and the State Level Engineering Entrance Examinations (SLEEE) for State Level Institutions – with an option to join AIEEE). This takes care of varying admission standards in these programmes and helps in maintenance of professional standards. This also solves problems of overlaps and reduces physical, mental and financial burden on students and their parents due to multiplicity of entrance examinations.

=== 2020 ===
In 2019, the then Ministry of Education released a Draft New Education Policy 2019, which was followed by a number of public consultations. it discusses reducing curriculum content to enhance essential learning, critical thinking and more holistic experiential, discussion-based and analysis-based learning. It also talks about a revision of the curriculum and pedagogical structure from a 10+2 system to a 5+3+3+4 system design in an effort to optimise learning for students based on cognitive development of children. Research Methodology has been added in the last year of graduation course and student will have the choice to leave the course and receive the certificate/ degree according to that.

On 29 July 2020, the cabinet approved a new National Education Policy with an aim to introduce several changes to the existing Indian education system, which will be introduced in India till 2026.

== Related policies ==
- Right to Education (RTE) - Article 21-A in the Constitution of India to provide free and compulsory education of all children in the age group of six to fourteen years as a Fundamental Right
- National Programme for Education of Girls at Elementary Level (NPEGEL)
- Rashtriya Madhyamik Shiksha Abhiyan (RMSA) for development of secondary education, launched in 2009.
- Saakshar Bharat (Adult Education) to create a literate society through a variety of teaching learning programmes for non-literate and neo-literate of 15 years and above.
- Rashtriya Uchchatar Shiksha Abhiyan (RUSA) for development of higher education, launched in 2013.
- Samagra Shiksha Abhiyan (SSA) - overarching programme for the school education to ensure equitable learning outcomes
- Inclusive Education for the Disabled at Secondary Stage (IEDSS)
- District Primary Education Program (DPEP) - launched in 1994 as a major initiative to revitalise the primary education system and to achieve the objective of universalisation of primary education.
- Draft National Policy on Education 2019
- The Anusandhan National Research Foundation Act, 2023 - To regulate research and development environment and scientific research in India, Aligning with the NEP 2020 to, in 2023.

== See also ==
- National Education Policy 2020
- Capitation fee
