= Solid State Physics Laboratory =

Laboratory in Delhi

- Established: 09-08-1961
- Director: Dr. Seema Vinayak
- Address: Lucknow Road, Timarpur, Delhi - 110 054
- Location: Delhi
- Operating agency: DRDO
- Website: SSPL Home Page

Solid State Physics Laboratory (SSPL) is a laboratory under the Defence Research & Development Organization (DRDO). Located in Delhi its primary function is research in the field of Solid State Materials, Devices and Sub-systems. Their activities include development of semi-conductor materials, solid state devices, electronic components/sub-systems and investigation of solid state materials/devices for futuristic defence applications.

== Quantum Technology Research Centre ==
The Quantum Technology Research Centre at Delhi's Metcalfe House was formally opened by DRDO on 27 May 2025. It has experimental setups to advance research and development in quantum technology. Characterization of Vertical-Cavity Surface-Emitting Lasers and Distributed Feedback Lasers; Test-beds for assessing single-photon sources; Micro Fabricated Alkali Vapor Cell Set-up for Characterization; and Experimental Platforms for Developing and Validating Quantum Key Distribution Techniques to Enable Ultra-secure Communication are among the key setups, which are led by the Scientific Analysis Group.

Advanced solid-state quantum devices and materials, an atomic magnetometer employing optically pumped magnetometry for ultra-sensitive magnetic field detection, and an Ultra-Small Atomic Clock based on coherent population trapping for extremely accurate timekeeping in environments denied by the GNSS are among the foundational technologies the lab focuses on.

== Projects ==
=== Monolithic microwave integrated circuits ===
Gallium nitride-based MMICs were successfully manufactured by SSPL in 2023. The Gallium Arsenide Enabling Technology Center (GAETEC) in Hyderabad produced GaN MMICs that passed every functionality test. A. P. J. Abdul Kalam started the drive to produce compound chips domestically in India. Following France's refusal to share GaN MMIC technology as part of an offset provision for the purchase of 36 Dassault Rafale under a ₹59,000-crore contract, the technology's development was expedited. DRDO programs like LSTAR (Long-Range Solid State Active Phase Array Radar), a precursor to Airborne Early Warning and Control, were delayed as a result of the rejection.

As of January 2026, SSPL and GAETEC have created over thirty chips in various frequencies for use in satellite communications, radars, 5G, and electronic warfare. The SBS Phase-III Space Based Surveillance project will make use of the chips.
