= M. V. Mathur =

Indian economist

Mukut Vehari Mathur (1915–2004) was an Indian economist and scholar. He was the vice-chancellor of Rajasthan University and founder chairman of the Jaipur-based Institute of Development Studies, also known as IDS.

Born in 1915 in Alwar in British India, Mathur was the Vice-Chancellor of Rajasthan University from 1966 to 1968. Later he became Director General of the National Council of Applied Economic Research from 1974 to 1975, and eventually Director of the National Institute of Education Planning and Administration from 1975 to 1980 and worked for several commissions and committees. He was the first chairman of the IDS from 1981 to 1987 and was the member of the Central Government's Fourth Pay Commission, Third Finance Commission, Education Commission and the Plantation Inquiry Commission. He also headed a committee of the Rajasthan Government on reorganisation of universities in the State from 1978 to 1980.

== Personal life ==
Mathur was married to Saroj Kumari Mathur in 1939. The couple had three daughters. In his final years, Mathur lived in the United States, where he died in Baltimore, Maryland, on 21 January 2004.

== Awards ==
Mathur was awarded the Padma Bhushan award in 1989 in recognition of his contribution to economic research. Prior to that, he had also received the Parikh Memorial Award in 1983 and the Rajasthan Ratna Award from the Government of Rajasthan in 1984.
