= Jayant Pandurang Naik =

Educator

- Born: 5 September 1907; Bahirewadi, Taluka- Ajara, District- Kolhapur
- Died: 30 August 1981 (aged 73)
- Spouse: Chitra Naik

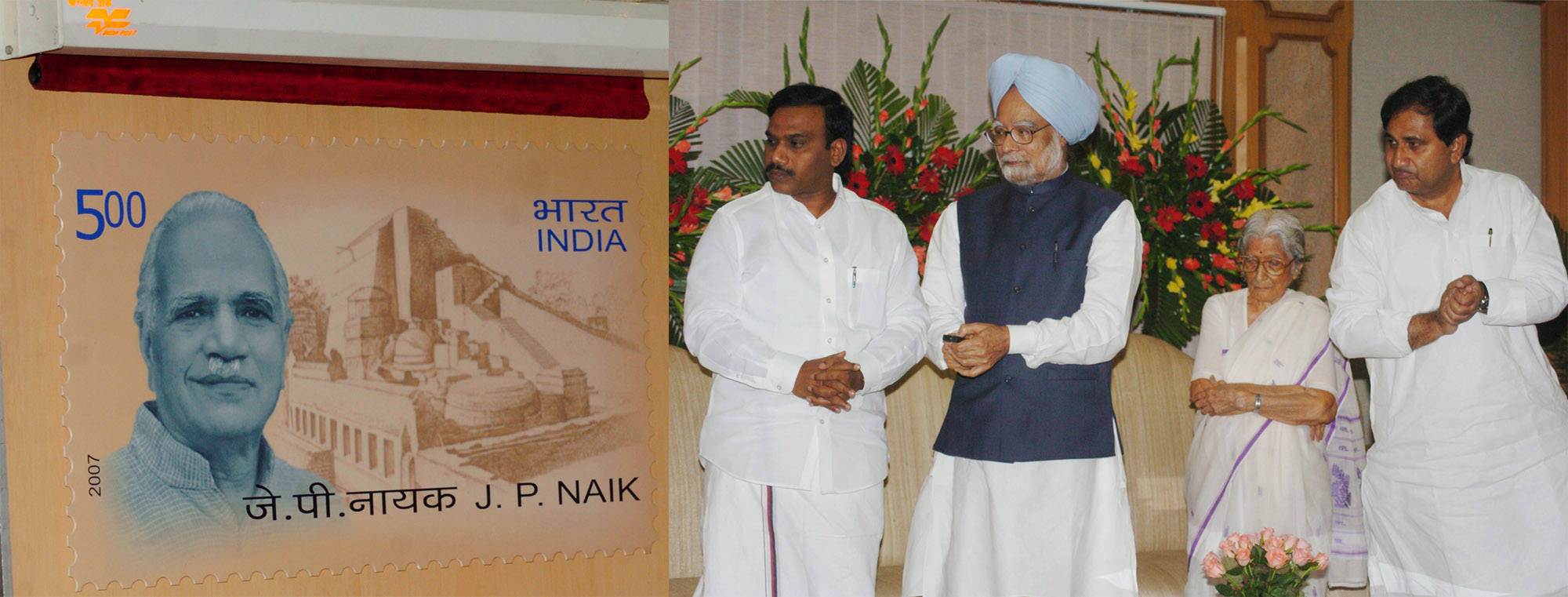
Manmohan Singh releasing a commemorative postage stamp in honour of Dr. J.P. Naik, on the occasion of 'Teachers Day', in New Delhi in 2007

Jayant Pandurang Naik, also known as J. P. Naik (5 September 1907 – 30 August 1981) was an Indian educationist.

== Biography ==
Naik was recognized by the UNESCO alongside Rabindranath Tagore and Mahatma Gandhi as one of the pioneering educationists of the 20th century.

He founded the Indian Institute of Education in 1948.

He served as Member Secretary of the Indian Education Commission from 1964 to 1966.

He also was Educational Adviser to the Government of India.

== Awards and contribution ==
- He joined Civil Disobedience Movement(1932), was arrested and interned in Bellari Jail for about a year and half, studied medicine in the jail and practiced it by nursing prisoners-patients.[1932]
- A secretary of the regency council and Development and Revenue Ministry Kolhapur State [1942]
- UNESCO consultant for the development plan for the provision of universal elementary education in Asia.[1960]
- Chief architect of the comprehensive report of the Indian Education Commission [1964-66]
- Padma Bhushan in 1974
- A commemorative stamp priced at Rs.5/- was issued on 5 September 2007
- Included in the UNESCO Roll of Honour of 100 Educational thinkers of the last 25 centuries.
