= National Skill Development Agency =

The National Skill Development Agency (NSDA) attempts to increase Employability of Youth in India. It is a fully autonomous body, constituted with the approval of Union Cabinet of India. On May 9, 2013, the Union Cabinet gave its nod to form NSDA.

== History ==
The Union Cabinet of India held a meeting on January 31, 2013 in which the proposal for building the National Skill Development Agency (NSDA) was first endorsed, after the suggested plan was reviewed by a Group of Ministers. The United Progressive Alliance (UPA) government approved the proposal.

== NSQF framework ==
National Skills Qualification Framework, is an integrated education and competency-based skills quality assurance framework developed by NSDA, according to which graded levels of skills are recognised based on the learning outcomes acquired through both formal or informal means. This enables students, to have their informally acquired skills graded and use those towards formal education, which is a core concept of India's National Education Policy 2020. Shri Vishwakarma Skill University in Haryana was founded on this concept.

NSQF caters for diversity of the Indian education and training systems, development of a set of outcome-based nationally recognised qualifications for each level, provide progression pathways for further study, enable integrated learning through education and vocational training and work experience, foster lifelong learning through transparent, accountable and credible mechanism which recognises prior learning.

== See also ==
- Education in India
- Vocational education in India
- Ministry of Skill Development and Entrepreneurship
- National Policy on Education
- National qualifications framework
- Rashtriya Uchchatar Shiksha Abhiyan
- Skill India
- University Grants Commission (India)
