= Bharatiya Grameen Mahila Sangh =

Bharatiya Grameen Mahila Sangh-(Karnataka), Bangalore
- Founded: 1955
- Founder: Late.Padma Bhushan Smt. Yashodhara Dasappa and Late Smt. C. Sharada
- Type: Community service
- Location: India
- Region served: Shelter & Rehabilitation for Women in Distress, Home for Orphans & Destitute Children, Old Age home for Women

Bharatiya Grameen Mahila Sangh or BGMS (National Association of Rural Women India), founded in 1955, is a non-political and non-sectarian national organization with branches all over India, in 14 states and union territories. It is affiliated with the Associated Country Women of the World (ACWW), the world's largest organization for rural women, which in turn is a consultative body for UNO, UNESCO, WHO, and ILO.

The goal of BGMS is the welfare, upliftment and empowerment of women, children, the aged and partially impaired. It works with UNODC in running an awareness programme on drug abuse in secondary schools, and is known for creating Mahila Mandals (women self-help groups) across villages in its areas, for women empowerment and education

== BGMS facilities ==
=== Children ===
The children are provided with medical & dental care, food, clothing, extracurricular activities, and education. They are housed in dormitories with bathrooms and toilets and monitored with CCTV cameras for their safety and security. In 2009, the Bangalore branch of BGMS started an English-medium school (Karnataka State board) for the children. The school, known as BGMS Shishukunj Vidyalaya, has over eighteen teachers as well as a Headmistress. The kids are divided into grades 1 through 10. Every week from Monday through Saturday all the students are educated in Math, English, Science, Social Studies, Kannada & Hindi, and more.

=== Stories of BGMS ===
Most children at BGMS attending the school stay away from their families because of financial issues, lack of proper education, or family problems. Many of the children previously lived in villages with large families, who did not have enough money to support the entire family. The education available in the villages was not sufficient and parents sent their children to BGMS in order to receive a better education.

=== Destitute women ===
The short stay home for destitute women is for women who have been victimized and traumatized by their husbands, in-laws or any others, and find themselves without a home. In BGMS, they are provided with vocational training and jobs to support themselves.

=== Elderly women ===
Elderly women, who have nobody to look after them, can find a home in BGMS. They are provided with food, medicare and recreational facilities.

== Branches ==
- Bhartiya Grameen Mahila Sangh, Haryana (Chandiggarh)
- Bhartiya Grameen Mahila Sangh, Delhi
- Bhartiya Grameen Mahila Sangh, Karnataka (Bangalore)
- Bhartiya Grameen Mahila Sangh, Madhya Pradesh, (Indore)
- Bhartiya Grameen Mahila Sangh, Punjab (Chandigarh)
- Bhartiya Grameen Mahila Sangh, West Bengal
