= Rashtriya Madhyamik Shiksha Abhiyan =

It is aimed at expanding and improving the standards of secondary education

- राष्ट्रीय माध्यमिक शिक्षा अभियान
- Country: India
- Prime Minister(s): Narendra Modi, Dr. Manmohan Singh
- Ministry: Ministry of Education
- Launched: March 2009 by Dr. Manmohan Singh

Rashtriya Madhyamik Shiksha Abhiyan (RMSA) (translation: National Mission for Secondary Education) is a centrally sponsored scheme of the Ministry of Human Resource Development, Government of India, for the development of secondary education in public schools throughout India. It was launched in March 2009. The implementation of the scheme has started from 2009–2010 to provide conditions for an efficient growth, development and equity for all. The scheme includes a multidimensional research, technical consulting, various implementations and funding support. The principal objectives are to enhance quality of secondary education and increase the total enrollment rate from 52% (as of 2005–2006) to 75% in five years, i.e. from 2009 to 2014. It aims to provide universal education for all children between 15 and 16 years of age. The funding from the central ministry is provided through state governments, which establish separate implementing agencies. The total budget allocated during the XI Five Year Plan (2002-2007) was ₹2,012 billion (US$21 billion).

== Objectives ==
The objectives of Rashtriya Madhyamik Shiksha Abhiyan can be summarised as follows:

1. To education
2. improve quality of education imparted at secondary level through making all secondary schools conform to prescribed norms.
3. To remove gender, socio-economic and disability barriers.
4. Universal access to secondary level education by 2017, i.e., by the end of the XII Five Year Plan.
5. Universal retention of students by 2020

== Planning for secondary education ==
=== Background ===
- Since educative initiation of the National Policy on Education (NPE), 1986, there have been no major changes in the structure and organization of the secondary and higher secondary school systems under the Ninth Plan period.
- The focus in this plan was on minimising the various disparities, to renew the curricula giving importance to vocationalisation and employment-oriented courses. It also gives importance to expanding and diversifying the open learning system, teacher training and ICT. Free education and hostel facilities for girls and integrated education for the disabled children was also brought into highlight, etc.

=== Participation of private sector ===
- There was an increased participation of the private sector including non-governmental organisations (NGOs). Currently, these private sectors manage around 51% of the secondary schools and 58% of the higher secondary schools.
- Opportunities were provided for those children who were not able to enroll themselves in formal education systems through national and state open schools by utilising contact-centres and multi-media packages.
- It highly emphasized on the content, process and the quality of education especially the environment education, science, mathematics and computer literacy with the financial help from the central government.
- After the revised NPE policy, 1992, new initiatives like revision of curriculum, resource centres for value education and National Centre for Computer-aided Education etc. have been taken up.
- The appeal lacks in the vocationalisation of education due to the lack of manpower demand and academic restraints etc. Hence, by 2000, only 10% of the students opt for the vocational streams against 25%.

=== Planning for children with special needs (CWSN) ===
- With the enactment of the Persons with Disabilities Act, 1995, the education for the CWSN received an impetus. This act entrusts certain governments and authorities for the provision of free access for these children towards education, allotted lands for certain purposes, non-discrimination in transports, financial incentive for them to undertake research etc.
- This scheme has also taken up programmes for the attitudinal changes and capacity building among teachers for the sake of these children.

== Four major heads ==
- Quality improvement:

In school, there was promotion of the science laboratories, environmental education, promotion of yoga, as well as centrally sponsored schemes of population education project, international mathematics and science olympiads. The state governments provide in-service training for the teachers and provide infrastructure and research inputs.

- Information communication technologies (ICT):

ICT comprises the centrally sponsored schemes like computer education and literacy in schools (CLASS) and educational technology (ET) which familiarizes the student with Information technology (IT). Due to the rise in IT demand in today's world, a major importance is given on it. Components of a merged scheme ICT in school include a) funding support towards computer education plans; b) strengthening and reorientation of the staffs of SIETS - state institutes of education and training; c) there is digitalisation of SIETs audio and video cassettes with the partnership of NGOs; and d) management of internet-based education by SIETs.

- Access and equity:

RMSA not only emphasizes on providing secondary education for the special focus groups that include scheduled tribe and scheduled caste groups, minority girls and CWSN children, but it also give importance on removing the existing disparities in socio-economic and gender background in the secondary level of education. They are termed as the vulnerable/ disadvantaged group. Certain strategies were implemented to provide free access towards secondary education and they are given as following steps:

1. Identification of the disadvantaged groups: For this purpose, educational indicators like gross enrollment ratio (GER), net enrollment ratio (NER), drop-out rate, retention rate, gender parity index (GPI), gender gap, etc. were analysed.
2. Need assessment: This is the critical step to prepare for the equity plan where the factors affecting the education of this group of children were evaluated with the involvement of the community members, teachers, civil society, etc.
3. Strategising for the addressing gaps: Since there are multiple interwoven factors that cause the un-equitable condition in this scenario, the strategy was called to have a set of multi-dimensional activities.
4. Project-based proposal: Development of a project-based strategy enables the RMSA to call for an evidence-based and outcome-oriented strategy.
- Integrated education for disabled children (IEDC):

Inclusive education have been highlighted to bring about expansion in terms of meeting/catering to the needs of the mentally and physically disadvantaged children. This schemes continues to be a separate centrally sponsored scheme. It includes several components for convergence with integrated child development services for early interventions, Sarva Shiksha Abhiyan (SSA) for the particular group at the elementary level, and special schools.

== Funding method ==
The Ministry of Human Resource Development directly provides funds to the state governments. Each state government then releases the funds to the approved implementing agencies or institutions. During the XI Five Year Plan the central government provided 75% of the total fund for each state, while 25% was borne by the state as matching share. However, in the remote northeastern states and Sikkim the matching share was waived to 10%.

== Achievements ==
Achievements of RMSA listed in its 2015-2016 report include:

- 11,577 new secondary schools approved; 10,082 functional
- 52,750 additional classrooms approved; 20,839 completed; 16,774 in progress
- 25,948 science laboratories approved; 10,107 completed, 8,532 in progress
- 21,864 computer rooms approved; 6,920 completed, 6,297 in progress
- 27,428 libraries approved; 10,133 completed, 8,929 in progress
- 31,453 art and craft rooms approved; 12,062 completed, 9,686 in progress
- 12,327 drinking water facilities approved; 7,096 completed, 2,507 in progress
- 5,408 teachers' quarters approved; 623 completed, 509 in progress
- 2,975 major repairs approved; 1,313 completed, 271 in progress

== Progress ==
There is a rise in demand for secondary education, but, despite an increase in the number of schools, their geographic distribution is uneven. The gender gap has narrowed. In the Tenth Plan the focus is on quality education at all levels.

== Disintegration ==
In 2018, Rashtriya Madhyamik Shiksha Abhiyan along with Sarva Shiksha Abhiyan and Centrally Sponsored Scheme on Teacher Education (CSSTE) was disintegrated to form Samagra Shiksha Abhiyan.

== See also ==
- Ministry of Human Resource Development
