= Scientific Analysis Group =

Indian defense institute

- Established: 1963
- Director: N Rajesh Pillai
- Location: Metcalfe House, Delhi-110054, Delhi
- Operating agency: DRDO
- Website: SAG home page

Scientific Analysis Group (SAG) is a laboratory of the Indian Defence Research & Development Organization (DRDO). Located in Delhi its primary function is to evolve new scientific methods for design and analysis of communication systems
