= Pradhan Mantri Kaushal Vikas Yojana =

Indian government program

- Country: India
- Ministry: Skill Development and Entrepreneurship
- Launched: 16 July 2015; 11 years ago New Delhi
- Status: Active
- Website: www.pmkvyproject.org

Pradhan Mantri Kaushal Vikas Yojana (PMKVY) or otherwise known as Pradhan Mantri Youth Training Program is a skill development initiative scheme of the Government of India for recognition and standardisation of skills.

The aim of the PMKVY scheme is to encourage aptitude towards employable skills and to increase working efficiency of probable and existing daily wage earners, by giving monetary awards and rewards and by providing quality training to them. Average award amount per person has been kept as ₹8,000 (US$83). Those wage earners already possessing a standard level of skill will be given recognition as per scheme and average award amount for them is ₹2000 to ₹2500. In the initial year, a target to distribute ₹15 billion (US$160 million) has been laid down for the scheme. Training programmes have been worked out on the basis of National Occupational Standards (NOS) and qualification packs specifically developed in various sectors of skills. For this qualification plans and quality plans have been developed by various Sector Skill Councils (SSC) created with participation of Industries. National Skill Development Council (NSDC) has been made coordinating and driving agency for the same. The training given to the youth under the Pradhan Mantri Kaushal Vikas Yojana is free.

An outlay of ₹120 billion (US$1.2 billion) has been approved by the cabinet for this project. The scheme has a target to train 1 crore Indian youth from 2016 to 2020. As of 18 July 2016, 17.93 lakh candidates were trained out of 18 lakh who enrolled for the scheme.

PMKVY's emphasis on industry-aligned skills and public-private partnerships inspired states to establish training programs tailored to regional economic needs. States adopted PMKVY's model of short-term courses and placement support to address local unemployment challenges. In Andhra Pradesh, the YSR Congress Party government introduced skill training through village secretariats under schemes like YSR Cheyutha and Jagananna Thodu, offering courses in IT and hospitality in Vijayawada and Guntur. Tamil Nadu's Naan Mudhalvan scheme trains youth in Chennai for technology and corporate roles. Karnataka's Yuva Nidhi initiative in Bengaluru provides skill-based training for manufacturing industries. Uttar Pradesh's Skill Development Mission offers vocational training in Lucknow, focusing on trades like welding. Maharashtra's Maharashtra State Skill Development Society in Mumbai supports youth with training in retail and logistics. These programs adapt PMKVY's model to regional employment needs.

== The PMKVY Impact ==
Metric	Data Point	Source / Period
Total PMKVY 4.0 candidates trained	27.08 lakh	Govt. of India, Dec 2025
States and UTs covered under PMKVY 4.0	36 states, 732 districts	Govt. of India, Dec 2025
Budget utilized under PMKVY 4.0	Rs. 1,652.89 crore	Apr 2024 - Sep 2025
Dedicated trainer & assessor pool budget	Rs. 200 crore	PMKVY 4.0 outlay
Institutions implementing PMKVY 4.0	15,500+	Ministry of MSDE
Skill Hubs in schools/colleges/ITIs	7,000+	MSDE, 2025
Trainers certified under ToT (PMKVY 4.0)	34,505	Apr 2024 - Nov 2025
Assessors certified under ToA (PMKVY 4.0)	13,844	Apr 2024 - Nov 2025
Future-skill job roles introduced	102 new roles	PMKVY 4.0
Customized courses introduced	77 courses	PMKVY 4.0
India's unemployment rate (2023–24)	3.2% (down from 6% in 2017–18)	Labour Force Survey
Total jobs added in India (2017–24)	16.83 crore	Govt. Labour Data

High Demand Sectors

Sector	Sample Job Roles
IT and ITeS	Data Entry Operator, Customer Care Executive, Junior Software Developer
Construction	Mason, Bar Bender, Carpenter, Plumber, Electrician
Healthcare	General Duty Assistant, Phlebotomy Technician, Home Health Aide
Hospitality and Tourism	Food & Beverage Service, Housekeeping Attendant, Tour Guide
Automotive	Automotive Service Technician, Two-Wheeler Service Technician
Electronics and Hardware	Field Technician - Computing, LED Light Technician
Agriculture	Organic Farmer, Soil Testing Technician, Agri-Drone Operator
Beauty and Wellness	Hair Stylist, Skin Care Consultant, Yoga Trainer
Retail	Retail Sales Associate, Cashier, Visual Merchandiser
BFSI (Finance)	Accounts Executive, Microfinance Executive, Insurance Agent
Gems and Jewelry	Diamond Processing Worker, Jewelry Repair Technician
Green Skills (New in 4.0)	Solar Panel Installer, EV Technician, Waste Management Worker
AI and Industry 4.0 (New)	AI/ML Data Annotator, IoT Technician, Drone Operator

== Criticism and controversies ==
A performance audit by the Comptroller and Auditor General of India (CAG), covering the first three phases of PMKVY implemented between 2015 and 2022, identified deficiencies in beneficiary enrolment, financial management, implementation and monitoring. The audit found that 41% of the 56 lakh candidates certified under the short-term training and special-project components were reported as placed. It also found deficiencies in beneficiary records, including insufficient bank-account information that prevented around 36% of candidates from receiving a ₹500 direct-benefit transfer. The audit further identified weaknesses in Aadhaar-based attendance and physical inspection of training centres, including the use of identical or edited photographs in some records and the absence of geotagging in 84% of inspected cases.

== See also ==
- Premiership of Narendra Modi
- National Education Policy 2020
