= Sarva Shiksha Abhiyan =

Indian education programme for universal elementary schooling

- सर्व शिक्षा
- Motto: Education for all
- Founder: Atal Bihari Vajpayee, Prime Minister of India
- Country: India
- Ministry: Ministry of Education
- Launched: 2001; 25 years ago
- Budget: ₹ 7266 Crores (For year 2021-2022)
- Status: Merged with the National Education Mission in 2018
- Website: http://www.ssa.nic.in/

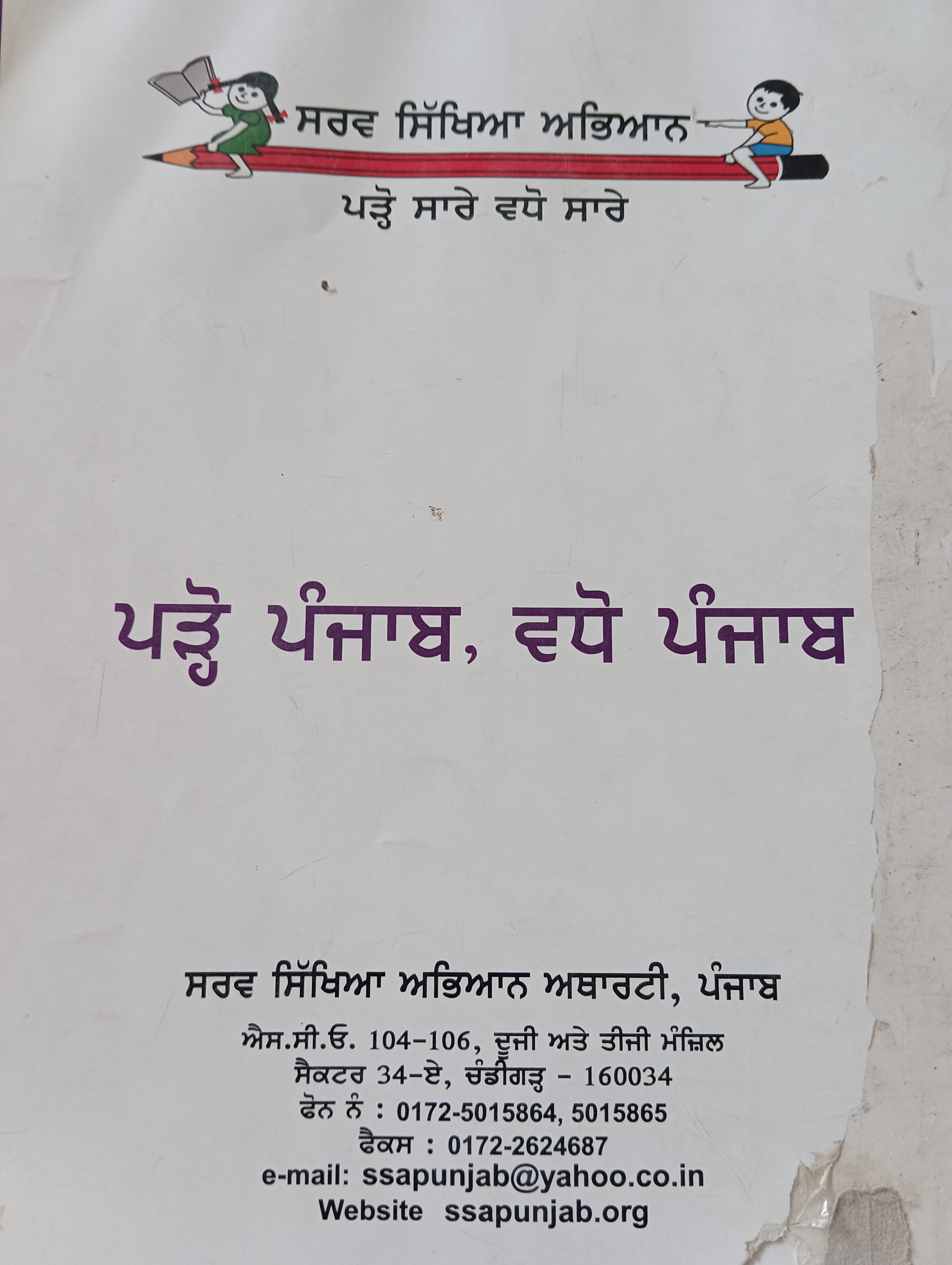
A primary school book published under Sarva Shiksha Abhiyan Punjab

Sarva Shiksha Abhiyan (Hindi: सर्व शिक्षा अभियान, lit. 'Education for all campaign'), or SSA, was an Indian Government programme aimed at the universalisation of Elementary education "in a time bound manner", the 86th Amendment to the Constitution of India making free and compulsory education to children between the ages of 6 and 14 (estimated to be 206 million children in 2001) a fundamental right (Article- 21A). The programme was pioneered by former Indian Prime Minister Atal Bihari Vajpayee. It aimed to educate all children between the ages of 6 and 14 by 2010. However, the completion target was later deferred beyond the original deadline.

== History ==
As an intervention programme, it started in 2002 and SSA has been operational since 2000–2001. However, its roots go back to 1993–1994, when the District Primary Education Programme (DPEP) was launched, with an aim of achieving the objective of universal primary education. DPEP, over several phases, covered 272 districts in 18 states of the country. The expenditure on the programme was shared by the Central Government (85%) and the State Governments (15%). The Central share was funded by a number of external agencies, including the World Bank, Department for International Development (DFID) and UNICEF. By 2001, more than $1.500 billion had been committed to the programme and 50 million children covered in its ambit. In an impact assessment of Phase I of DPEP, the authors concluded that its net impact on minority children was impressive, while there was little evidence of any impact on the enrolment of girls. Nevertheless, they concluded that the investment in DPEP was not a waste, because it introduced a new approach to primary school interventions in India.

The Right to Education Act (RTE) came into force on 1 April 2010. Some educationists and policy makers believe that, with the passing of this act, SSA has acquired the necessary legal force for its implementation.

== Objectives ==
The SSA scheme is designed to improve curriculum, educational planning, teacher education, and management. The main goals of the SSA program are as follows:

- To allow students to not work for food but instead come to school and eat giving them more reasons to come to school
- To establish new schools in such habitations with no schooling facilities.
- To arrange for alternative schooling facilities.
- To strengthen the existing school infrastructure by providing. additional classrooms, toilets, and drinking water facilities.
- To give quality elementary education and life skills to the students
- To manage maintenance grants and school improvement grants.
- To provide uniforms and free textbooks to the school children.
- To provide and increase the strength of teachers by appointing additional teachers in schools with a shortage of teachers.
- To promote girls’ education to bring a change in the status of women.
- To promote the education of children with special needs or differently-abled children.
- To promote equal education opportunity to children of households belonging to SC/ST, landless agricultural labourers, the Muslim minority, etc.
- To understand the educational requirements of the children of traditionally excluded categories.
- To bridge the digital divide by giving computer education to school children.
- To strengthen and enhance the capacity and skills of the existing school teachers through extensive training, grants for developing materials for teachers-learning and maintaining academic support structure at a block, cluster, and district level

== Funds ==
Its initial outlay was ₹7,000 crore and in 2011–12, the Government of India allocated ₹21,000 crore (US$2.2 billion) for this project, 40 percent increase of the previous year. Many persons and trust have also contributed and as the program became more popular fund also grew.

== Features ==
Sarva Shiksha Abhiyan (SSA) is a programme for Universal Elementary Education. This program is also an attempt to provide an opportunity for improving human capabilities to all children through the provision of community-owned quality education in a mission mode. It is a response to the demand for quality basic education all over the country. The iconic "School Chalein Hum" anthem was written by the lyricist Mehboob Kotwal (often credited simply as Mehboob) to promote the Sarva Shiksha Abhiyan (SSA) programme. The song was composed by the musical trio Shankar-Ehsaan-Loy and sung by Shaan. It originally served as the promotional anthem for the Government of India's Sarva Shiksha Abhiyan (Education for All) campaign, which was produced by Bharatbala Productions.

== Padhe Bharat Badhe Bharat ==
Padhe Bharat Badhe Bharat is a nationwide sub-programme of Sarva Shiksha Abhiyan. Children who fail to read in early education lag behind in other subjects. The programme is designed to improve comprehensive early reading, writing and early mathematics programme for children in Classes I and II. Under this programme, ₹762 crore (US$79 million) was approved to States. The programme will not only provide print rich environment, timely distribution of books but will also include new teacher mentoring and appraisal system. SSA has been operational since 2000–2001 to provide for a variety of interventions for universal access and retention, bridging of gender and social category gaps in elementary education and improving the quality of learning. SSA interventions include inter alia, opening of new schools and alternate schooling facilities, construction of schools and additional classrooms, toilets and drinking water, provisioning for teachers, regular teacher in service training and academic resource support, free textbooks & uniforms and support for improving learning achievement levels / outcome. With the passage of the RTE Act, changes have been incorporated into the SSA approach, strategies and norms. The changes encompass the vision and approach to elementary education, guided by the following principles: Holistic view of education, as interpreted in the National Curriculum Framework 2005, with implications for a systemic revamp of the entire content and process of education with significant implications for curriculum, teacher education, educational planning and management. Equity, to mean not only equal opportunity, but also creation of conditions in which the disadvantaged sections of the society – children of SC, ST, Muslim minority, landless agricultural workers and children with special needs, etc. – can avail of the opportunity. Access, not to be confined to ensuring that a school becomes accessible to all children within specified distance but implies an understanding of the educational needs and predicament of the traditionally excluded categories – the SC, ST and others sections of the most disadvantaged groups, the Muslim minority, girls in general, and children with special needs. Gender concern, implying not only an effort to enable girls to keep pace with boys but to view education in the perspective spelt out in the National Policy on Education 1986 /92; i.e. a decisive intervention to bring about a basic change in the status of women. Centrality of teacher, to motivate them to innovate and create a culture in the classroom, and beyond the classroom, that might produce an inclusive environment for children, especially for girls from oppressed and marginalised backgrounds. Moral compulsion is imposed through the RTE Act on parents, teachers, educational administrators and other stakeholders, rather than shifting emphasis on punitive processes. Convergent and integrated system of educational management is pre-requisite for implementation of the RTE law. All states must move in that direction as speedily as feasible.

Provide quality elementary education including life skills with a special focus on the education of girls and children with special needs as well as computer education.

== Integration ==
In 2018, Sarva Shiksha Abhiyan along with Rashtriya Madhyamik Shiksha Abhiyan was launched to form Samagra Shiksha Abhiyan.

== Sub-Programs ==
The National Programme for Education of Girls at Elementary Level (NPEGEL) was launched in 2003 as a sub-component of the Sarva Shiksha Abhiyan. It was designed to address the specific educational needs of underprivileged girls through gender-sensitive interventions, bridge courses, and model cluster schools.
