= National Education Mission =

School education program in India

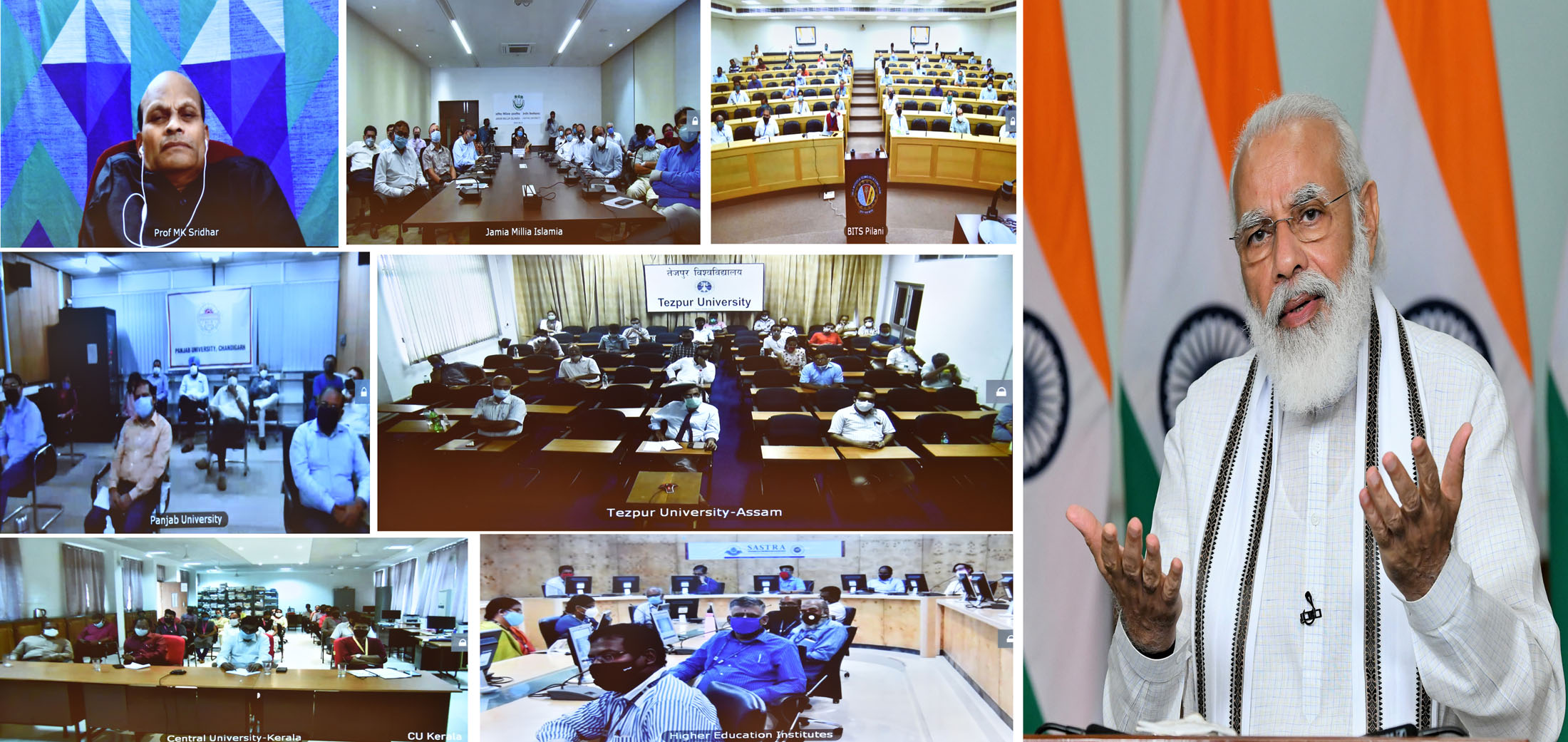
PM Modi delivering the inaugural address at an NEP 2020 related event in August 2020

The National Education Mission, also known as Samagra Shiksha, is a centrally sponsored scheme of the Government of India covering school education from pre-primary to Class 12. Introduced in 2018, it brought together three existing programmes: Sarva Shiksha Abhiyan, Rashtriya Madhyamik Shiksha Abhiyan, and the Centrally Sponsored Scheme on Teacher Education. In 2021, the NIPUN Bharat Mission was launched as part of Samagra Shiksha Abhiyan, teaching literacy and numeracy skills in universities by Grade 3.

In the 2023–24 Union Budget presented on 1 February 2023, the Samagra Shiksha Abhiyan allocated an amount of ₹37,453.47.

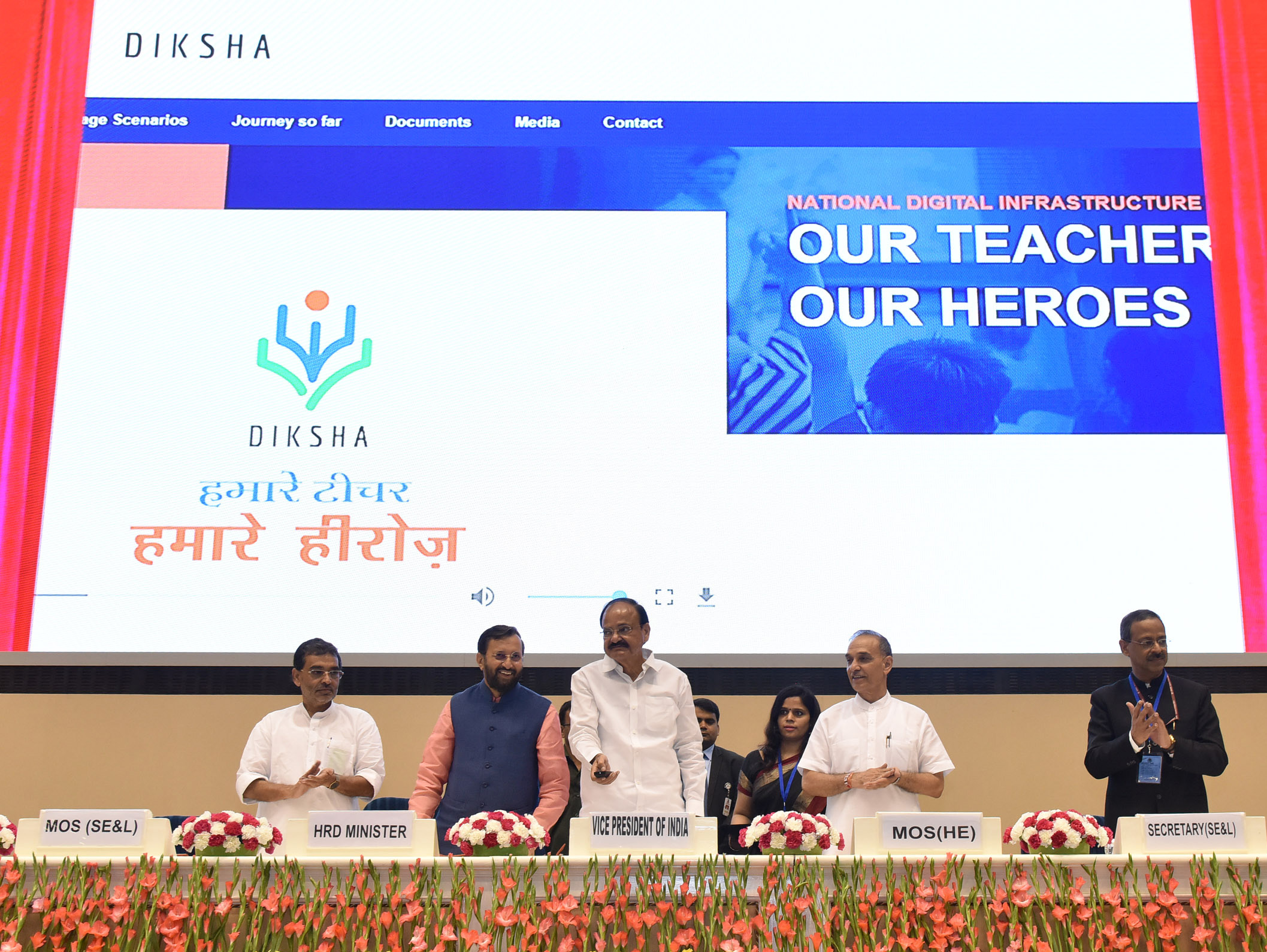
The DIKSHA Portal, launched in 2017

== Saakshar Bharat ==
Saakshar Bharat is a government of India initiative launched by Prime Minister Manmohan Singh to conduct teaching-learning programmes for the non-literate aged 15 and above. It was launched on 8 September 2009, as a centrally sponsored scheme. It aims to recast India's National Literacy Mission to focus on the literacy of women. It is a scheme from the Department of School Education, Ministry of Education, Government of India. The National Literacy Mission covered 597 districts under the Total Literacy Campaign, 485 districts under the Post Literacy Programme and 328 districts under the Continuing Education Programme. The Saakshar Bharat Mission has chosen six villages for 'Model Adult Education Centers' under Lok Shiksha Samiti in the Karimnagar district, in Telangana state.

The National Literacy Mission (NLM) is a nationwide program started by the Government of India in 1988 with the approval of the Cabinet as an independent and autonomous wing of the Ministry of HRD (the then Department of Education). Its stated aim is to educate 80 million adults in the age group of 15–35 over an eight-year period (30 million by 1990 and additional 50 million by 1995). Later target was readjusted to achieve literacy of 75% by the end of 11th Five Year Plan 2002-2007 and 80% by the end of 12th Five Year Plan 2007-2012.

== National Initiative for Proficiency in Reading with Understanding and Numeracy Bharat ==
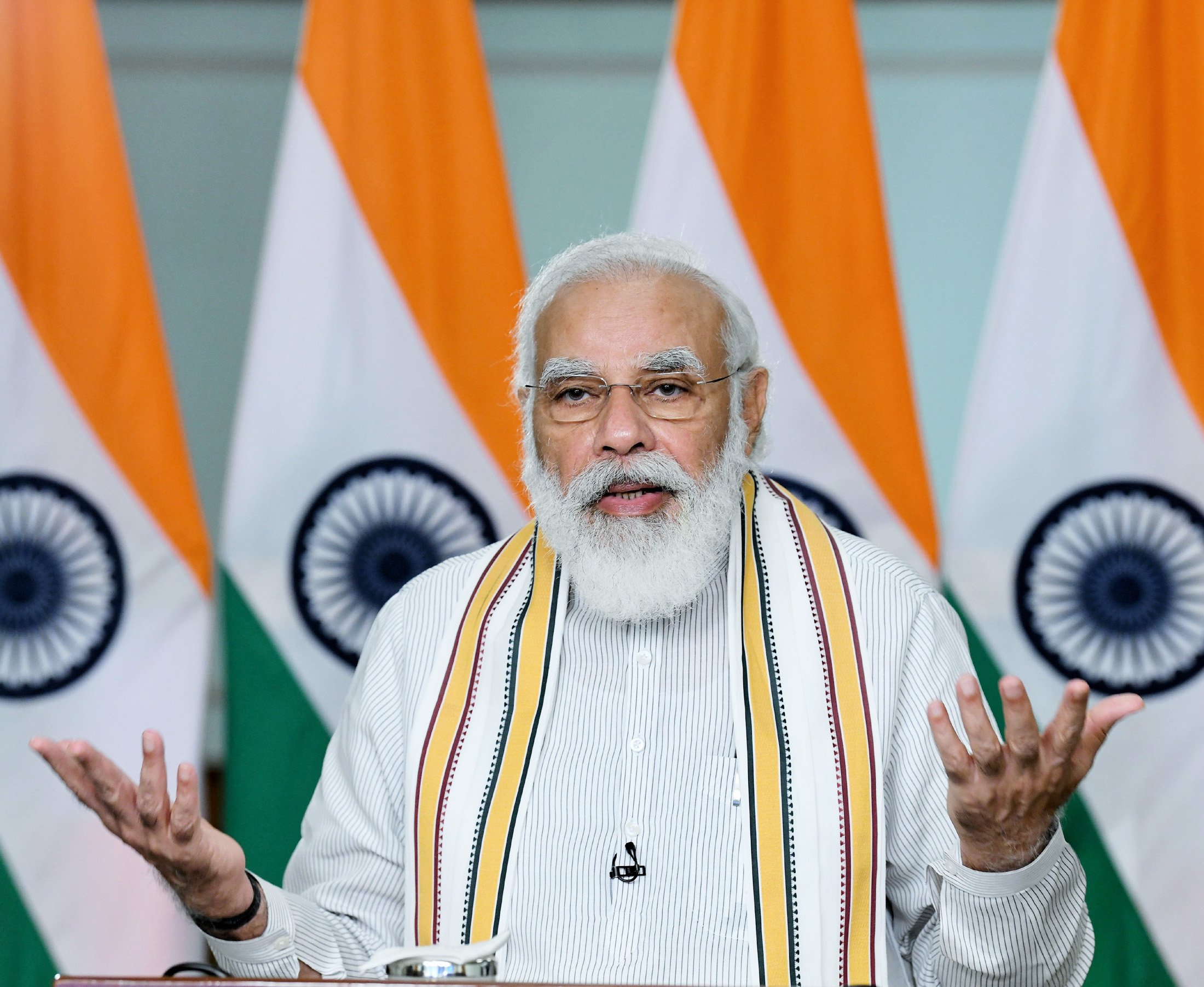
The prime minister addressing the 'Conclave on School Education in the 21st Century'

The Ministry of Education has launched a National Initiative for Proficiency in Reading with Understanding and Numeracy (NIPUN Bharat), with the stated goals that all Indians attain foundational literacy and numeracy (FLN) by the end of Grade 3 by 2026–27. These are called ‘Lakshyas’ and they are defined for each level from the Balvatika to Grade 3. The children who are in Classes 4 and 5 were provided individual teacher guidance. The estimated budget for the NIPUN Bharat Mission is ₹2,688 for fiscal year 2021–22.

States such as Uttar Pradesh, Madhya Pradesh, West Bengal, Bihar, Tamil Nadu, Assam, and Haryana have also launched their respective State Foundational Literacy and Numeracy Missions based on the framework of NIPUN Bharat.

=== Framework ===
The NIPUN Bharat Mission categorizes the expected learning outcomes into three primary developmental goals, namely (i) Children to maintain good health and well-being, (ii) Children to become effective communicators, and (iii) Children to become evolved learners and connect with their environment.

=== Foundational Learning Study 2022 ===
The Foundational Learning Study 2022 (FLS 2022) is a study serving as the baseline for the implementation of the NIPUN Bharat Mission by the Ministry of Education in March 2022. The FLS 2022 is one of the largest ever studies to assess the foundational level of schoolchildren in India, with a sample size of 86,000 students across grades III, V, VIII and X across 10,000 schools. It is also the first-ever study to benchmark Oral Reading Fluency (ORF) and numeracy on the basis of the UN Global Proficiency Framework.

=== Foundational Learning in India's G20 Presidency ===
'Foundational Literacy and Numeracy, especially in the context of blended learning' has been recognized by the Ministry of Education as one of the four 'pillars' of the Education Working Group for India's G20 Presidency in 2023.
