= Ministry of Skill Development and Entrepreneurship =

Government ministry of India

- कौशल विकास और उद्यमशीलता मंत्रालय
- Branch of Government of India

- Ministry of Skill Development and Entrepreneurship

Agency overview
- Jurisdiction: Government of India
- Annual budget: ₹9,885.80 crore (US$1.0 billion) (2026–27 est.)
- Minister responsible: Jayant Chaudhary, Minister of State (Independent Charge)
- Website: www.skilldevelopment.gov.in www.msde.gov.in

The Ministry of Skill Development and Entrepreneurship (Hindi: कौशल विकास और उद्यमशीलता मंत्रालय), established on 9 November 2014 and gazetted on 8 December 2014, is a ministry of the Government of India. After the formation of Narendra Modi's first government on 26 May 2014, the Ministry of Youth Affairs and Sports was renamed the Ministry of Skill Development, Entrepreneurship, Youth Affairs, and Sports. It was subsequently bifurcated following a cabinet reshuffle on 9 November 2014, with the official gazette notification published on 8 December 2014.

The Ministry is responsible for coordinating all skill development efforts across the country. It was established to oversee matters related to industrial training, apprenticeships, and other skill development initiatives that were previously managed by the Ministry of Labour and Employment. The Ministry's goal is to bridge the gap between the demand and supply of skilled workers, while fostering the development of new skills and innovative thinking, not only for existing jobs but also for future job opportunities.

The Ministry of Skill Development and Entrepreneurship is led by the Minister of Skill Development and Entrepreneurship, whose efforts are supported by the Minister of State for Skill Development and Entrepreneurship, a junior minister in the ministry. The first minister of the ministry was Rajiv Pratap Rudy, who served as the Minister of State (Independent Charge) from 9 November 2014 to 3 September 2017. The incumbent minister is Jayant Chaudhary, who has held the position of Minister of State (Independent Charge) since 10 June 2024.

== Cabinet Ministers ==
- Note: MoS, I/C – Minister of State (Independent Charge)

No.	Portrait	Minister (Birth-Death) Constituency	Term of office			Political party	Ministry	Prime Minister
No.	Portrait	Minister (Birth-Death) Constituency	From	To	Period	Political party	Ministry	Prime Minister
1		Rajiv Pratap Rudy (born 1962); MP for Saran (MoS, I/C)	9 November 2014	3 September 2017	2 years, 298 days	Bharatiya Janata Party	Modi I	Narendra Modi
2		Dharmendra Pradhan (born 1969); Rajya Sabha MP for Bihar, till 2018; Rajya Sabha MP for Madhya Pradesh, from 2018	3 September 2017	30 May 2019	1 year, 269 days	Bharatiya Janata Party	Modi I	Narendra Modi
3		Mahendra Nath Pandey (born 1957); MP for Chandauli	31 May 2019	7 July 2021	2 years, 37 days	Bharatiya Janata Party	Modi II	Narendra Modi
(2)		Dharmendra Pradhan (born 1969); Rajya Sabha MP for Madhya Pradesh	7 July 2021	9 June 2024	2 years, 338 days	Bharatiya Janata Party	Modi II	Narendra Modi
5		Jayant Chaudhary (born 1978); Rajya Sabha MP for Uttar Pradesh (MoS, I/C)	10 June 2024	Incumbent	2 years, 60 days	Rashtriya Lok Dal	Modi III	Narendra Modi

== Ministers of State ==
No.	Portrait	Minister (Birth-Death) Constituency	Term of office			Political party	Ministry	Prime Minister
No.	Portrait	Minister (Birth-Death) Constituency	From	To	Period	Political party	Ministry	Prime Minister
1		Anantkumar Hegde (born 1968); MP for Uttara Kannada	3 September 2017	30 May 2019	1 year, 269 days	Bharatiya Janata Party	Modi I	Narendra Modi
2		Raj Kumar Singh (born 1952); MP for Arrah	31 May 2019	7 July 2021	2 years, 37 days	Bharatiya Janata Party	Modi II	Narendra Modi
3		Rajeev Chandrasekhar (born 1964); Rajya Sabha MP for Karnataka	7 July 2021	9 June 2024	2 years, 338 days	Bharatiya Janata Party	Modi II	Narendra Modi

== Organizations ==
The Ministry's ambit revolves around providing and facilitating skill development initiatives and training infrastructure with the following institutions:

- Director General of Training (formerly the Directorate General of Training & Employment, Ministry of Labour and Employment)
- National Skill Development Corporation
- National Skill Development Agency
- National Skill Development Fund
- National Institute of Entrepreneurship and Small Business Development (NIESBUD)
- Indian Institute of Entrepreneurship (IIE), Guwahati
- Infrastructure Equipment Skill Council (IESC)
- Regional Directorate of Apprenticeship Training (RDAT), Chennai
- Regional Directorate of Skill Development and Entrepreneurship, Telangana
- Skill India Digital Hub (SIDH)
- Central Staff Training and Research Institute (CSTARI), Kolkata
- National Council for Vocational Education and Training (NCVET)
- National Council for Vocational Training (NCVT)
- National Skill Trainers Institute (NSTI)
- National Instructional Media Institute, Chennai

== Schemes ==
- Apprenticeship Training Portal
- Bharat Skills
- Jan Shikshan Sansthan (JSS)
- National Apprenticeship Training Scheme
- National Qualifications Register
- Skill Development Initiative Scheme (SDIS)
- Pradhan Mantri Kaushal Vikas Yojana
- UDAAN, a Special Industry Initiative for J&K
- Start-up Village Entrepreneurship Programme (SVEP), to support entrepreneurs in rural areas to set-up enterprises at the village-level in non-agricultural sectors.

== See also ==
- Industrial training institute
