= Industrial training institute =

Vocational Training Institutes (India)

Industrial Training Institute
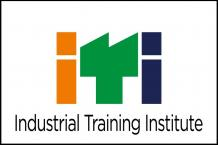
- Other name: राजकीय औद्योगिक प्रशिक्षण संस्थान
- Established: 1950; 76 years ago
- Focus: Skill development
- Subsidiaries: NCVT & SCVT
- Owner: Ministry of Skill Development and Entrepreneurship
- Location: India
- Website: ncvtmis.gov.in

Industrial training institutes (ITI) and industrial training centers (ITC) are qualifications and post-secondary schools in India constituted under the Directorate General of Training (DGT), Ministry of Skill Development and Entrepreneurship, Union Government, to provide training in various trades.

== Training schemes ==
=== Craftsmen Training Scheme (CTS) ===
The Directorate General of Training (DGT) initiated the Craftsmen Training Scheme in 1950. Training periods range from six months to two years in over 130 different specialties. Prerequisites for the courses range from 8th to 12th class pass. Upon completion of the training, trainees write the All India Trade Test (AITT). Successful candidates receive the National Trade diploma (NTD).

Admission to the various trades of ITI/ITC is done every year in August. The ITI Admission Procedure starts before the commencement of the new session. Sessions under this scheme start from 1 August. Under the NCVT guidelines, admission to ITIs is based on merit-based or a written examination. Admission to the private ITIs is done directly. Information and updates related to ITI admission and results are also made available online.

==== Trades ====
Some trades under this scheme are listed below.

Basic qualification for entry to Trade course in Industrial Training Institute is generally Tenth standard pass (S.S.C or S.S.L.C) for many and for few eighth standard (8^{th}) pass. The duration of trade course in I.T.I may two or one or three years depending on the particular course opted. ITI conduct two types of trades for admission M-Group and E-group. M Group For Madhyamik Pass Candidates and E Group For Class Viii Pass Candidates.

- Building Maintenance
- Biotechnologist
- Electronics Mechanic
- Excavator Operator (Mining)
- Mechanic Repair & Maintenance of Two Wheeler's
- Mechanic Auto Electrical and Electronics
- Sanitary Hardware fitter
- Architectural Assistant
- Carpenter
- Domestic Painter
- Foundry man Technician
- Gold Smith
- Industrial Painter
- Interior Decoration and Designing
- Marine Engine Fitter
- Mason (Building Constructor)
- Mechanic Repair & Maintenance of Heavy Vehicles
- Mechanic Repair & Maintenance of Light Vehicles
- Mechanic Diesel Engine
- Mechanic (Tractor)
- Mechanic Communication Equipment Maintenance
- Mechanic Lens or Prism Grinding
- Physiotherapy Technician
- Plastic Processing Operator
- Plumber
- Pump Operator-cum-Mechanic
- Rubber Technician
- Sheet Metal Worker
- Stone Mining Machine Operator
- Stone Processing Machines Operator
- Welder (Gas and Electric)
- Attendant Operator (Chemical Plant)
- Draughtsman (Civil)
- Draughtsman (Mechanical)
- Electrician
- Electroplater
- Fitter
- Instrument Mechanic
- Instrument Mechanic (Chemical Plant)
- Information Communication Technology System Maintenance
- Laboratory Assistant (Chemical Plant)
- Lift and Escalator Mechanic
- Machinist
- Machinist (Grinder)
- Maintenance Mechanic (Chemical Plant)
- Marine Fitter
- Mechanic Mining Machinery
- Mechanic Agricultural Machinery
- Mechanic Computer Hardware
- Mechanic Consumer Electronics Appliances
- Mechanic-cum-Operator Electronics Communication System
- Mechanic Industrial Electronics
- Mechanic Machine Tools Maintenance
- Mechanic Mechatronic
- Mechanic Medical Electronics
- Mechanic Motor Vehicle
- Mechanic (Refrigeration and Air-Conditioner)
- Mechanic (Radio & TV)
- Operator Advanced Machine Tools
- Painter General
- Radiology Technician
- Spinning Technician
- Surveyor
- Textile Mechatronics
- Textile Wet Processing Technician
- Tool & Die Maker (Dies &Moulds)
- Tool & Die Maker (Press Tools, Jigs & Fixtures)
- Turner
- Vessel Navigator
- Weaving Technician
- Wire man
- Cabin or Room Attendant
- Computer Aided Embroidery And Designing
- Corporate House Keeping
- Counselling Skills
- Creche Management
- Driver Cum Mechanic (Light Motor Vehicle)
- Data Entry Operator
- Domestic House Keeping
- Event Management Assistant
- Firemen
- Front Office Assistant
- Hospital Waste Management
- Institution House Keeping
- Insurance Agent
- Library & Information Science
- Medical Transcription
- Network Technician
- Old Age Care Assistant
- Para Legal Assistant or Munshi
- Preparatory School Management (Assistant)
- Spa Therapy
- Tourist Guide
- Baker & Confectioner
- Cane Willow and Bamboo Worker
- Catering and Hospitality Assistant
- Computer Operator and Programing Assistant(COPA)
- Craftsman Food Production (General)
- Craftsman Food Production (Vegetarian)
- Cutting and Sewing
- Dairying
- Desktop Publishing Operator
- Digital Photographer
- Dress Making
- Surface Ornamentation Techniques (Embroidery)
- Fashion Design and Technology
- Finance Executive
- Fire Technology
- Floriculture and Landscaping
- Footwear Maker
- Basic Cosmetology
- Health Safety and Environment
- Health Sanitary Inspector
- Horticulture
- Hospital House Keeping
- Human Resource Executive
- Leather Goods Maker
- Litho Offset Machine Minder
- Marketing Executive
- Multimedia Animation and Special Effects
- Office Assistant cum Computer Operator
- Photographer
- Plate Maker cum Impositor
- Preservation of Fruits and Vegetables
- Process Cameraman
- Secretarial Practice (English)
- Stenographer & Secretarial Assistant (English)
- Stenographer & Secretarial oratory Equipment Technician
- Architectural Draughtsmanship
- Resource Person
- Drawing/Mathematics
- Web Designing and Computer Graphics
- Agro Processing
- Food Beverage
- Foods and Vegetable Processing
- Information Technology
- Art terms
- Basic safety and shopfloor safety
- Travel & Tourism
- Tool & Die Maker Engineering

== Schemes/Courses for ITI pass outs ==
After training and passing out from Industrial training Institute (I.T.I),Candidates can join job in private or public (government) sector industry as a trainee or can join apprenticeship training scheme in different companies. Few opt for self employment like starting their own workshop or garage or firm providing services like plumbing, electrical motor/generator winding, civil masonary or painting.Government(public) sector jobs for ITI certificate holders are in Railways, State transport corporations (STC), Electricity generating, transmission and distribution companies, Municipal and Panchayat local bodies of administration in India.

=== Apprenticeship Training Scheme ===
After completing ITI, tradesmen can undergo apprenticeship training in different industries. The Scheme is implemented by Directorate General of Training under Ministry of Skill Development and Entrepreneurship with the objective that "Training imparted in Institutions alone is not sufficient for acquisition of skills and needs to be supplemented by training in the actual work place."

Duration for Apprenticeship training is generally one year for those appeared in ITI final exam, i.e. AITT. For freshers usually it takes three years. During the training trainees are paid stipend on monthly basis.

CITS SCHEME:-After passing ITI one can be illegible to appear AISET and join Craft Instructor Training Scheme at NSTI and ITOT all over India also via RPL Scheme to be an Instructor and can get National Instructor certificate.

=== Lateral Entry to Polytechnic Diploma Engineering ===
Polytechnics approved by AICTE offer engineering courses for 3 years duration through an entrance exam known with different name in different states (JEXPO in West Bengal, JEEP in Uttarakhand, JEECUP in Uttar Pradesh, CG PPT in Chandigarh etc.).And After the completion of the course candidates are awarded with diploma in different disciplines. Those who have passed minimum 2 years ITI course with National Trade Certificate are given an opportunity to go for a lateral entry directly to the 2nd year of the Polytechnic diploma course. Entrance exam known as VOCLET is conducted every year for this purpose along with the JEXPO.
