= List of humanitarian and human rights groups accusing Israel of genocide in Gaza =

Over the course of the Gaza war, which began in 2023, the State of Israel has been accused by hundreds of humanitarian and human rights organizations (NGOs, INGOs, and IGOs) of perpetrating a genocide targeting the Palestinian people in the Gaza Strip. This accusation became more widespread among the international community as formal statements declaring the Gaza genocide to be a fact were increasingly issued by several prominent and reputable organizations around the world upon the conclusion of comprehensive academic and legal investigations on the matter, including: the United Nations (via a special committee and commission of inquiry), the International Association of Genocide Scholars, the Lemkin Institute for Genocide Prevention, Genocide Watch, Amnesty International, Human Rights Watch, and Médecins Sans Frontières. As a result, many countries have recognized the Gaza genocide, while others have deferred their position on recognition in the ongoing International Court of Justice case brought by South Africa. A number of countries besides Israel have denied the Gaza genocide on various grounds.

Throughout 2023 and 2024, humanitarian and human rights groups sometimes implied that Israel's actions in the Gaza Strip may constitute genocide without explicitly accusing Israel of genocide. However, these implications largely shifted to explicit accusations of genocide when International Criminal Court arrest warrants for Israeli leaders were issued in November 2024; Israel's prime minister Benjamin Netanyahu and former defence minister Yoav Gallant have been charged with and are wanted for war crimes and crimes against humanity, particularly for facilitating starvation as a method of warfare, which caused the Gaza Strip famine.

Israel has been characterized as engaging in four of the five acts constituting the crime of genocide under Article 2 of the Genocide Convention of 1948, (Note: Article 2 of the Genocide Convention defines genocide as "any of the following acts committed with intent to destroy, in whole or in part, a national, ethnical, racial or religious group" through acts such as (a) murder, (b) inflicting serious bodily or mental harm, (c) inflicting conditions of life calculated to destroy the group, (d) imposing measures intended to prevent births, and (e) forcibly transferring children of the group to another group.) with the only absent genocidal act being a perpetrator's forcible transfer of children belonging to the targeted group. The most frequent allegation against Israel in this context is that it has "inflicted conditions of life calculated to destroy" Palestinians in the Gaza Strip. Specific acts cited by groups charging Israel with the crime of genocide include: practicing collective punishment, particularly by restricting Palestinians' access to basic necessities, such as food, water, fuel, and electricity; destroying medical infrastructure and services, causing the collapse of the Gaza Strip healthcare system; destroying civilian infrastructure, such as schools and cultural heritage sites; engaging in sexual and gender-based violence, especially to destroy Palestinian women; shooting and bombing civilians (extermination), which has disproportionately impacted Palestinian children; and violating various international conventions by engaging in chemical warfare, particularly with white phosphorus munitions. The intensity of Israel's military offensives into the Gaza Strip, particularly that of the bombing campaigns, has been cited as the primary cause of the Gaza Strip humanitarian crisis that has caused Palestinian societal breakdown across the territory.

Additional actions commonly cited by groups as proof of Israeli genocidal intent include the use of dehumanizing language for Palestinians; repeated forced displacement of Palestinians; the failure of Israeli soldiers to distinguish between Palestinian combatants and non-combatants in official justifications for relevant incidents; the minimization of the Israeli military's moral and legal obligation as a belligerent force to take any measures necessary to protect all civilians during combat operations; the failure of Israel's government to comply with a January 2024 order by the International Court of Justice to immediately halt military activity in the Gaza Strip, address and prevent or punish genocidal incitement, and lift restrictions on humanitarian aid and services entering the territory; the ignoring or downplaying by Israel's government of humanitarian alerts by the United Nations and other international bodies with regard to mass civilian death in the Gaza Strip; the number of health workers killed; the number of journalists killed; and inflammatory statements by numerous Israeli government and military officials, such as dystopian references to biblical passages and overt declarations of support for actions illegal under international law.

== List ==
Date of accusation	Organization	Claim type	Remedies sought	Genocide Convention Art. II elements	Sources
October 2023	Lemkin Institute for Genocide Prevention	E	C, AE, S	K, H, C	
October 2023	Palestinian Medical Relief Society	E	C, AC	K, H, C	
November 2023	Euro-Mediterranean Human Rights Monitor	E	/	K, H, C	
December 2023	Center for Constitutional Rights	E	AE, S	C, K, H	
December 2023	International Federation for Human Rights	E	C, AE, S	K, H, C	
January 2024	Action Against Hunger	R	AE, C, AC	C	
January 2024	CAFOD	R	C, AC	C	
January 2024	Islamic Relief Worldwide	R	C, AE, AC	K, H, C	
January 2024	United Palestinian Appeal	E	AC	C	
January 2024	Jewish Voice for Peace	E	C	K, H, C	
February 2024	Middle East Children's Alliance	E	C, AC	C	
March 2024	Adalah Center for Rights and Freedoms	E	AW, S, AE, CS	C, H	
March 2024	Doctors Against Genocide	E	C, AC	C	
March 2024	Mennonite Central Committee	E	C	C	
March 2024	Palestine Legal	E	C	K, C	
April 2024	American Friends Service Committee	E	C, AC	C	
October 2024	Collective statement: ActionAid; Action For Humanity; Afri (Action from Ireland); Amos Trust; Bloody Sunday Trust; Centre for Global Education; CESVI; Children Not Numbers; Christian Aid; Churches for Middle East Peace; Comhlamh Justice for Palestine; Council for Arab-British Understanding; Embrace the Middle East; Feminist Humanitarian Network; Gender Action for Peace and Security; Global Justice Now; HelpAge International; Interpal; Ireland-Palestine Solidarity Campaign; KinderUSA; Medical Aid for Palestinians; Médecins du Monde Spain; Middle East Children's Alliance; Muslim Aid; Novact Institute for Nonviolence; Plan International Jordan; Sabeel-Kairos UK; Sadaka-The Ireland Palestine Alliance; TDH Italy; Trinity College Dublin Students' Union; Vento di Terra; War Child; War on Want; WeWorld; Welfare Association	R	C, AC, AE	C, K, H	
October 2024	Collective statement: ABCD Bethlehem; Access Center for Human Rights; ALEF - Act for Human Rights; Alternatives Internationales; Amos Trust; Anglican Pacifist Fellowship; Applied Research Institute-Jerusalem; Asamblea de Cooperación por la Paz; Asociación Otra Escuela; Association Switzerland-Palestine; Avaaz; Baytna pour le soutien de la société civile Belgium Palestine Mental Health Network; Cairo Institute for Human Rights Studies; Caritas Internationalis; Caritas MONA; CCFD-Terre Solidaire; Children Not Numbers; Christian Aid; Churches for Middle East Peace; CIVICUS; Clowns Without Borders Sweden; Clowns Without Borders UK; CNCD-11.11.11; Collective Aid; Comisión de Justicia y Paz de Confregua; Cordaid; Corporate Europe Observatory; Council for Arab-British Understanding; Danish Refugee Council; DAWN; Egala Association; Emmaus International; Equal Legal Aid; EuroMed Rights Network; Europe Cares e.V. European Alternatives; Fellowship of Reconciliation - USA; Fenix Humanitarian Legal Aid; Firefly International; Forces Watch; FORO SALUD NACIONAL; For You Foundation for Humanitarian Response and Development; France Palestine Mental Health Network; FSMAGH; Fund for Global Human Rights; Global Centre for the Responsibility to Protect; Global Network of Women Peacebuilders; Global Witness; Greek Council for Refugees; HelpAge International; Hivos; Human Rights & Democracy Media Center SHAMS; Human Rights Sentinel; Human Security Collective; Humanity & Inclusion; ICNA SISTERS CANADA; Initiatives et Changement; International Center for Transitional Justice; International Civil Society Action Network; International Fellowship of Reconciliation; International Peace Bureau; INTERSOS; Ireland Palestine Mental Health Network; Jewish Network for Palestine; Jewish Voice for Peace–Health Advisory Council; KAIROS Canadian Ecumenical Justice Initiatives; Kenya Human Rights Commission; KinderUSA; Knowledge Platform Security & Rule of Law; Lebanese Center for human Rights; MADRE; Mayworks Kjipuktuk/Halifax; Médecins du Monde International Network; Medicus Mundi Italia; Migrant Roots Media; Minnesota Peace Project; Movement for community-led Development; MPower Change Action Fund; Muslim Association of Brantford; Muslim Delegates and Allies; Musulmanas de Guatemala por Palestina; NO NAME KITCHEN; Nonviolence International; Nonviolent Peaceforce; Norwegian Refugee Council; Olof Palmes Internationella Center; Omega Research Foundation; Palestinian Assoc. of Brantford; PAX; Pax Christi Australia; Pax christi Deutsche Sektion; Pax Christi England and Wales; Pax Christi Flanders; Pax Christi International; Pax Christi Scotland; Pax Christi USA; Peace Boat; Peace Direct; Peace SOS; Peace Watch Switzerland; Peace, Justice, Sustainability, NOW! People's Health Movement; Permanent Peace Movement; Plan International; Plateforme des ONG françaises pour la Palestine; Polish Medical Mission; Première Urgence Internationale; Progressive Democrats of Pennsylvania; Protection International; PVE Works; Quakers in Scotland; Resource Centre for human Rights & Civic Education; ReThinking Foreign Policy; Rethinking Security; Righting Relations Canada; Saferworld; SAM Organization for Rights and Liberties; Seenaryo; Share The World's Resources; SOS Children's Villages UK; Ster Organization for human development Syrian Network for Human Rights; Tamkeen for Legal Aid and Human Rights; Terre des Hommes Netherlands; The Advocacy Academy; The Dallaire Institute for Children, Peace, and Security; The Desmond and Leah Tutu Legacy Foundation; The International Federation for Rights and Development; The Kvinna till Kvinna Foundation; The Namibia NGO Forum Trust; The National Organization of Yemeni Reporters SADA; The socio-economic Justice Initiative-MAAN; The Syria Campaign; Train of Hope Dortmund e. V. UK Palestine Mental Health Network; United Nations Association - UK; University Network for Human Rights; US Council of Muslim Organizations; Vision GRAM-International; War Child; WESPAC Foundation, Inc. WeWorld; WILPF US; Women for Women International; Women's International League for Peace & Freedom-Minnesota, USA, Branch; World Organisation Against Torture; Yemen Relief and Reconstruction Foundation مؤسسة مدافعات للحقوق والحريات	R	C, AE, AC	C	
October 2024	ActionAid	E	C, AC	C	
October 2024	Medical Aid for Palestinians	R	C, AC	C	
October 2024	US Campaign for Palestinian Rights	E	AE, AW, S	K, H, C	
November 2024	United Nations Special Committee to Investigate Israeli Practices Affecting the Human Rights of the Palestinian People	E	C	K, C	
December 2024	Amnesty International	E	C, AE, S	K, H, C	
December 2024	ANERA	R	C, AC, AE	C	
December 2024	European Center for Constitutional and Human Rights	E	AE, AW	K, H, C	
December 2024	Genocide Watch	E	S, AE	K, H, C	
December 2024	Human Rights Watch	E	AE, S, AW	K, H, C	
January 2025	Christian Aid	R	C, AE, AC, S	K, C	
January 2025	Médecins du Monde (Switzerland)	R	C, AC	C	
March 2025	Medico International	E	C, AC	H, C	
May 2025	Collective statement: Addameer Prisoner Support and Human Rights Association; Al Dameer Association for Human Rights; Ramallah Center for Human Rights Studies; Jerusalem Center for Legal Aid and Human Rights; Hurryyat Centre for Defense of Liberties and Civil Rights; Independent Commission for Human Rights; Muatin Institute for Democracy and Human Rights	E	AC	K, H, C	
May 2025	Al-Haq	E	AW	K, H, C	
May 2025	Al Mezan Center for Human Rights	E	AW	K, H, C	
May 2025	Defence for Children International	E	AW	K, H, C	
May 2025	Palestinian Centre for Human Rights	E	AW	K, H, C	
June 2025	Human Concern International	E	AC	C	
June 2025	Trócaire	E	C, AC	C	
June 2025	B'Tselem	E	C, AE, S, AW	K, H, C	
July 2025	Oxfam	E	C, AC	C	
July 2025	Physicians for Human Rights–Israel	E	C, AE, AW	K, H, C, PB	
August 2025	International Centre of Justice for Palestinians	E	C, AE, S	C, K	
August 2025	International Association of Genocide Scholars	E	AE, S, AW, AC	K, H, C	
August 2025	War Resisters' International	E	AC	C	
September 2025	American-Arab Anti-Discrimination Committee	E	AE, S, C, AC	K, H, C, PB	
September 2025	Council on American–Islamic Relations	E	AE, AW, S	K, H, C, PB	
September 2025	Médecins Sans Frontières / Doctors Without Borders	E	C, AC	K, H, C	
September 2025	Refugees International	E	AE, CS, S, AC	C	
September 2025	UNHRC Commission of Inquiry on Gaza genocide	E	AE, S	K, H, C, PB	
September 2025	UNRWA	E	AC, C	C	
September 2025	Volkshilfe Österreich	E	AC, S	C	
October 2025	Médecins du Monde (France)	E	C, AC	K, H, C	
Legend: Claim type: E = explicit accusation of genocide · R = focuses on genocide "risk" if current trends continue, implies there may already be genocide without explicitly making this claim; Remedies sought: C = ceasefire · AE = arms embargo / halt arms transfers · AW = arrest warrants / legal action against individuals · AC = aid access (unhindered humanitarian access, end siege/blockade) · S = sanctions / other punitive state measures; Genocide Convention (Art. 2) elements alleged: K = killing members · H = serious bodily or mental harm · C = deliberately inflicting conditions of life calculated to bring about its destruction (e.g., famine/siege) · PB = preventing births · TC = forcibly transferring children; Many groups updated their claims from R (genocide risk) to E (explicit genocide accusation); such groups are listed as E at the date they updated their claim to E.

== United Nations ==
Officials of the United Nations have made statements alluding to the Gaza genocide throughout the course of the war.

- In November 2023, a group of UN special rapporteurs wrote, "We remain convinced that the Palestinian people are at grave risk of genocide." UN Special Rapporteur on the Human Rights to Safe Drinking Water and Sanitation Pedro Arrojo said that based on the Rome Statute, which counts "deprivation of access to food or medicine, among others" as a form of extermination, "even if there is no clear intention, the data show that the war is heading towards genocide". A group of UN human rights experts said there was "evidence of increasing genocidal incitement" against Palestinians.
- In response to a January 2024 Times of Israel report that the Israeli government was in talks with the Congolese government to take Palestinian refugees from Gaza, the UN special rapporteur Balakrishnan Rajagopal said, "Forcible transfer of Gazan population is an act of genocide."
- In May 2024, UN Special Rapporteur on Violence Against Women Reem Alsalem said that Palestinian women "are experiencing a full-blown genocide. They are being exterminated. There are few places in the world where we've seen something like this." The UNHCR Special Rapporteur on adequate housing, Balakrishnan Rajagopal, said that Israel's destruction of Gaza "constitutes an act of genocide as well because the purpose of that destruction, exceeding 70 to 80 per cent across Gaza, is to make the place uninhabitable".
- In October 2024, the Office of the United Nations High Commissioner for Human Rights released a report that accused the Israeli military of "the crime against humanity of extermination" for killing health workers and targeting health facilities.
- On 8 November 2024, the United Nations human rights office condemned many violations of international law that "could amount to war crimes, crimes against humanity and possibly even 'genocide'", calling on third states to prevent "atrocity crimes".
- On 14 November 2024, the UN Special Committee to investigate Israeli practices concluded that they are consistent with the characteristics of genocide.
- In February 2025, UN Special Rapporteur on the Right to Food Michael Fakhri said that Israel is committing a genocide and is working to "slow down its genocide through a starvation campaign", concluding that the United States and Germany were complicit in the ensuing famine.
- In May 2025, twenty UN independent experts and four working groups issued a statement accusing Israel of genocide and criticising the debate over the genocide terminology: "While States debate terminology – is it or is it not genocide? – Israel continues its relentless destruction of life in Gaza, through attacks by land, air and sea, displacing and massacring the surviving population with impunity ... States must act swiftly to end the unfolding genocide, dismantle apartheid, and secure a future in which Palestinians and Israelis coexist in freedom and dignity."
- In May 2025, UN Under-Secretary-General for Humanitarian Affairs and Emergency Relief Tom Fletcher urged world leaders to act decisively to prevent genocide in Gaza. The US has vetoed UN Security Council ceasefire resolutions on Gaza six times, remaining the sole opponent while all 14 other members backed the calls.
- In September 2025, the UN Human Rights Council's Independent International Commission of Inquiry issued a report concluding that Israel is committing genocide against Palestinians in Gaza. The Commission found reasonable grounds to determine that Israeli authorities and security forces have committed, and continue to commit, four of the five genocidal acts defined under the 1948 Genocide Convention: killing members of the group; causing serious bodily or mental harm; deliberately inflicting conditions of life calculated to bring about the group's physical destruction in whole or in part; and imposing measures intended to prevent births. The Commission further determined that genocidal intent is the only reasonable inference from the totality of evidence, and that Israeli political and military leaders have incited the commission of genocide. The Commission has characterised its findings as the most authoritative UN determination to date on the Gaza war. Israeli officials, the US State Department, and the US-and Israel-backed Gaza Humanitarian Foundation (GHF) condemned the report. Netanyahu denied its core findings on starvation, while the GHF called the report a collection of "falsehoods" that "rewards bad actors and undermines" humanitarian efforts.

== Other international organizations ==
In February 2024 the then-African Union Commission Chairperson Moussa Faki said: "Gaza is being completely annihilated and its people are deprived of all their rights. We denounce the Israeli operation, which has no parallel in the history of humanity." The official communiqué of the 38th summit of the African Union stated that "Israel is committing genocide against the Palestinians and must be prosecuted internationally."

On 26 March, Pakistan's OIC representative said that Israel's desire for a "final solution to the Palestinian question is plain for all to see, as its forces encircle Rafah like vultures and its ravenous land grab continues unabated". In May 2024, the Organisation of Islamic Cooperation called on member states to end "the export of weapons and ammunition used by its army to perpetrate the crime of genocide in Gaza".

On 16 August 2025, 31 Arab and Islamic countries and the Arab League released a joint statement condemning "Israel's crimes of aggression, genocide, and ethnic cleansing" in Gaza, and highlighted the need to ensure access to humanitarian aid to "halt the systematic starvation policy used by Israel as a weapon of genocide." A month later, the European Parliament passed a resolution on the Gaza war, which in its initial form mentioned "genocidal actions" from Israel, but this was ultimately omitted at the request of the European People's Party.

== See also ==
- Gaza genocide recognition
- Academic and legal responses to the Gaza genocide
