= Peace Brigades International =

Non-governmental organization

Peace Brigades International Logo

Peace Brigades International (PBI) is a non-governmental organization founded in 1981 which "protects human rights and promotes non-violent transformation of conflicts". It primarily does this by sending international volunteers to areas of conflict, who then provide protective, non-violent accompaniment to members of human rights organizations, unions, peasant groups and others that are threatened by political violence. PBI also facilitates other peace-building initiatives within conflict countries. They are a "nonpartisan" organization that does not interfere with the affairs of those they accompany.

Currently, in 2020, PBI has field projects in Colombia, Guatemala, Honduras, Indonesia, Kenya, Mexico and Nepal.

== History ==
Inspired by the work of Shanti Sena in India, Peace Brigades International was founded in 1981 by a group of nonviolence activists, including Narayan Desai, George Willoughby, Charles Walker, Raymond Magee, Jamie Diaz and Murray Thomson. In 1983, during the Contra war, PBI sent a short-term peace team to Jalapa, Nicaragua positioning themselves between warring factions. This project was continued and expanded by Witness for Peace. The first long term PBI project was started that same year in Guatemala (1983–1999, re-initiated in 2003), followed by El Salvador (1987–1992), Sri Lanka (1989–1998), North America (1992–1999, in Canada and the USA), Colombia (since 1994), the Balkans (1994–2001, jointly with other organizations), Haiti (1995–2000), Mexico (since 1998), Indonesia (1999–2011, and since 2015), Nepal (2005–2014), Kenya (since 2013) and Honduras (since 2013).

In 1989, PBI volunteers escorted Nobel Peace Prize winner Rigoberta Menchú on her first visit back to Guatemala from exile. Other individuals that PBI has protected include Amílcar Méndez, Nineth Montenegro and Frank LaRue in Guatemala; and Mario Calixto and Claudia Julieta Duque in Colombia.

The international protective accompaniment work that PBI developed and pioneered has inspired similar work by many other organizations, including Witness for Peace, the Christian Peacemaker Teams, the Muslim Peacemaker Teams, Nonviolent Peaceforce, Protection International, the International Peace Observers Network and the Meta Peace Team.

== Organization ==
PBI is a team-based organization that uses consensus decision making. It is non-hierarchical in structure. There are three different aspects to the overall PBI structure, which are the Country Groups, the Field Projects, and the International Level (which consists of the PBI General Assembly, the International Council (IC), and the International Operations Council (IOC)). An international meeting is held every three years, that is attended by members from across the organization, to analyze and modify the direction of each country's program.

== Volunteers ==
PBI attracts volunteers from diverse backgrounds for its work in the field projects. Argentina, Australia, Austria, Bangladesh, Belgium, Bolivia, Brazil, Chile, Colombia, Czech Republic, Finland, France, Germany, Greece, Holland, Ireland, Italy, Mexico, Netherlands, Norway, Poland, Portugal, Romania, Slovenia, Spain, Sweden, Switzerland, the United Kingdom, and the United States — among many other countries — have all been represented among PBI's volunteer pool. Potential volunteers must be strongly committed to non-violence, and all applicants must attend in-depth training where they learn the philosophy of non-violence, non-violent strategies, and team dynamics. All volunteers must be fluent in Spanish for the Mexican, Guatemalan and Colombian projects, and all volunteers for the Nepalese program must be fluent in English and have a basic understanding of Nepali. An applicant may not be a citizen of the country they desire to work in, and must be able to make a minimum commitment of one year.

Apart from getting involved in the field projects, there is also the possibility for individuals to be able to volunteer in PBI's country groups.

== Awards ==
Peace Brigades International has received a number of awards for its work, including the Memorial Per la Pau "Josep Vidal I Llecha" (1989), the Friedrich Siegmund-Schultze Förderpreis (1995, PBI-Germany), the Memorial de la Paz y la Solidaridad Entre los Pueblos (1995), the International Pfeffer Peace Prize (1996) the Aachener International Peace Prize (1999), the Medalla Comemorativa de la Paz (1999), the Martin Ennals Award for Human Rights Defenders (2001, Colombia project), and the Jaime Brunet Prize (2011).

== Projects and groups ==
=== Field projects ===
- PBI Colombia Field Project
- PBI Guatemala Field Project
- PBI Honduras Field Project
- PBI Indonesia Field Project
- PBI Kenya Field Project
- PBI Mexico Field Project
- PBI Nicaragua in Costa Rica Field Project
- PBI Nepal Monitor Project Archived 2 May 2015 at the Wayback Machine

=== Country groups ===
- PBI Belgium
- PBI Canada
- PBI France
- PBI Germany
- PBI Italy
- PBI Netherlands
- PBI Norway
- PBI Spanish State
- PBI Sweden
- PBI Switzerland Archived 8 May 2012 at the Wayback Machine
- PBI United Kingdom
- PBI United States

== See also ==
- List of anti-war organizations

== Sources ==
- Mahony, Liam; Eguren, L.E. (1998). Unarmed Bodyguards: International Accompaniment for the Protection of Human Rights. West Hartford, Conn: Kumarian Press. ISBN 978-156549068-0.
- "PBI's History". Peace Brigades International.
- "Peace Brigades International: Annual Review 2014" (PDF).
