= Meta Peace Team =

US based non-profit organization

- Founded: 1993
- Founder: Rev. C. Peter Dougherty, Jasiu Milanowski
- Type: Nonprofit 501(c)(3)
- Purpose: Peace Activism
- Location: Lansing, Michigan, U.S.
- Region served: Worldwide
- Revenue: US$189,181 (2011)
- Website: www.metapeaceteam.org

Meta Peace Team (MPT), formerly Michigan Peace Team, is a nonprofit, grassroots organization founded in 1993 that seeks to pursue peace through active nonviolence and create an alternative to militarism through empowered peacemaking. MPT provides creative nonviolence training workshops to ordinary citizens with a framework of third party nonviolent intervention (TPNI), and it deploys peace teams to conflict areas both domestically and internationally. Its peace teams have worked in places such as Iraq, Haiti, Bosnia, Egypt, Panama, Mexico, Gaza Strip, and the West Bank; they have also been placed within the United States to create peaceful presences at national and state political conventions, Ku Klux Klan rallies, and gay pride parades, among many other events. MPT also works in collaboration with other peace and justice groups around the globe, including Nonviolent Peaceforce, Christian Peacemaker Teams, Veterans for Peace, the International Solidarity Movement, Peace Brigades International, the Shanti Sena Network, and the Metta Center for Nonviolence. Its current offices are located in Lansing and Detroit, Michigan. MPT is a founding member of the Shanti Sena Network.

== History ==
=== Formation ===
MPT initially began in the 1980s as Michigan Faith and Resistance before evolving into Michigan Peace Team in 1993. Peace activists Rev. C. Peter Dougherty and Jasiu Milanowski co-founded MPT, and in 1998, MPT officially became a nonprofit 501(c)(3) organization.

MPT's original focus was to recruit volunteers for peace teams to be deployed internationally, but after realizing that peace team members needed rigorous training beforehand in order to be successful, developing a training curriculum in nonviolent peacemaking also became a core focus of MPT's work.

=== Work with domestic and international peace teams ===
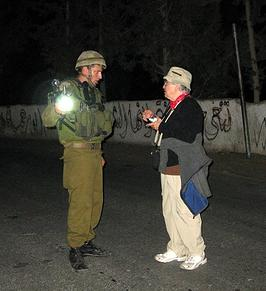
MPT international team member Martha Larsen de-escalates an Israeli soldier during a raid on the West Bank

MPT deployed its first international peace team in 1993, sending its members to take part in a three-month project in Bosnia, joining Mir Sada ("Peace Now" in Serbo-Croatian). Two years later, MPT joined Christian Peacemaker Teams for its first excursion to the Middle East, working to establish peace in the Israeli–Palestinian conflict. As of 2001, MPT began sending teams there regularly for three to twelve weeks at a time and has maintained an active presence in Gaza Strip and the West Bank. To prepare for these trips, MPT members say that they participate in multiple all-day training workshops and study manuals.

During a 2004 trip to Palestine, MPT peace team members attended the Sabeel Conference on the Threat of Christian Zionism held in Jerusalem. In addition, they supported the release of Israeli peace activist Mordechai Vanunu, who was imprisoned for 18 years for publicly exposing Israel's nuclear weapons program. The MPT activists also attended Palestinian protests against Israeli occupation. In April 2007, the organization established its first long-term team in the West Bank. In 2008, a four-member team of MPT traveled to the West Bank to promote nonviolent conflict intervention by accompanying Palestinian children to school and shepherds to their fields and acting as international observers at military checkpoints; they also participated in a demonstration against the separation wall that Israel was building on Palestinian-claimed land. Throughout a 2009 trip, MPT members assisted Palestinians who claimed to have been harassed by illegal settlers. Their work included attempting to prevent potential violence and documenting what they witnessed with photographs. MPT representatives returned to the West Bank in 2010 to oversee the annual olive harvest that was allegedly disrupted by Israelis and to protect against the demolition of Palestinian homes.

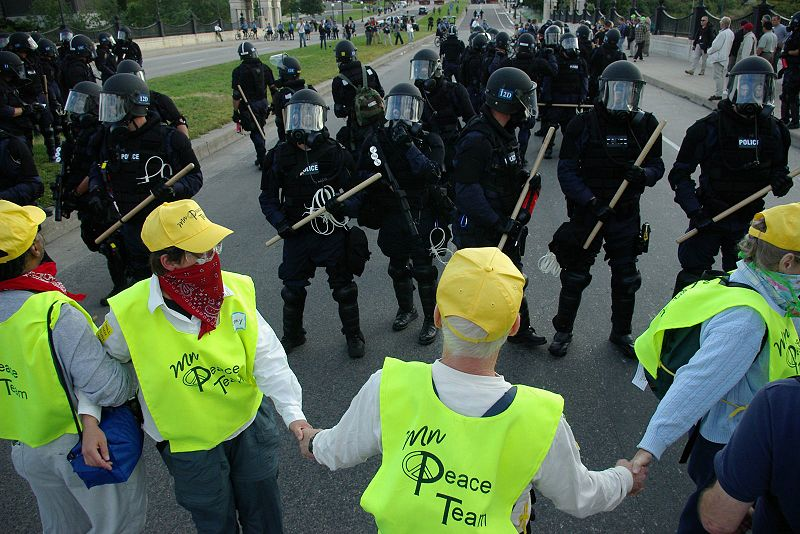
MPT peacekeepers engage in "interpositioning," placing themselves between police and civilians, at the 2008 Republican National Convention in St. Paul, Minnesota

MPT also advocates for peace in the Middle East from its home in Michigan. For example, in May 2004, MPT held a sit-in at Senator Carl Levin’s office in Lansing in an attempt to speak with the senator and persuade him to oppose Israel's onslaught on Rafah in southern Gaza. Also, its members were present at a May 2010 rally in the state's capital, which called for an end to the massacres occurring in Palestine under Israeli occupation as well as protesting military aid to Israel by the United States.

In addition, MPT sends international teams to other areas around the world. For example, throughout 1996–1999, MPT deployed multiple teams to Chiapas, Mexico.

Since 1998, MPT started fielding regular domestic peace teams as well, placing teams to prevent violence during events such as the 1999 riot in East Lansing, Michigan; Ku Klux Klan rallies in Ann Arbor, Michigan; the 2001 execution of Timothy McVeigh in Indiana; and the 2008 GOP convention in Minnesota. Furthermore, MPT teams have been present at the Terry Jones event; the American Catholic Council Conference in Detroit, Michigan; Gay Pride Day in Lansing, Michigan; the Arab-American Festival; the Occupy Movement in four states; and the Right to Work protests in order to maintain peace and safety.

=== Awards, honors, and notable achievements ===
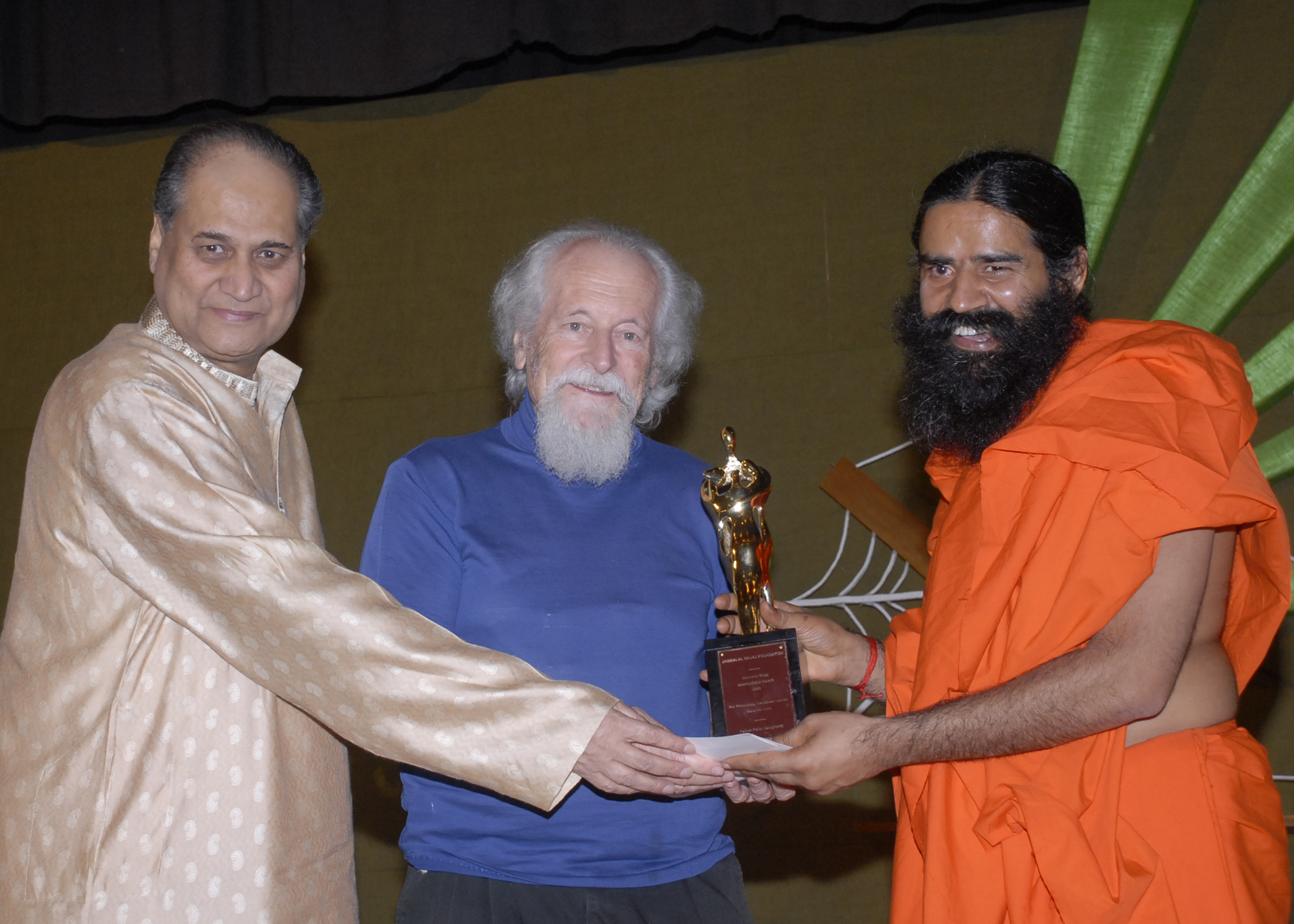
Co-founder Rev. C. Peter Dougherty receives the 2009 Jamnalal Bajaj International Award in India

The Ann Arbor City Council issued an official proclamation of gratitude for MPT's peace team presence at City Hall, the Rally for CommUNITY & Justice at Wheeler Park, and the Pledge Against the Klan on May 9, 1998.

As of 2000, MPT became a member organization of Nonviolent Peaceforce. In 2004, the Global Nonviolent Peaceforce invited MPT to present at their North American Conference and provide trainings for domestic peace teams, and in July 2005, MPT was selected to represent the United States at the conference for the Global Partnership for the Prevention of Armed Conflict, located at the United Nations headquarters in New York City.

In May 2007, MPT received the Certificate of Appreciation from the Palestinian National Authority at the Second Bil'in International Conference on Popular Resistance held in the West Bank.

Dougherty, MPT's co-founder, was awarded the Jamnalal Bajaj International Award for Promoting Gandhian Values Outside India in November 2009.

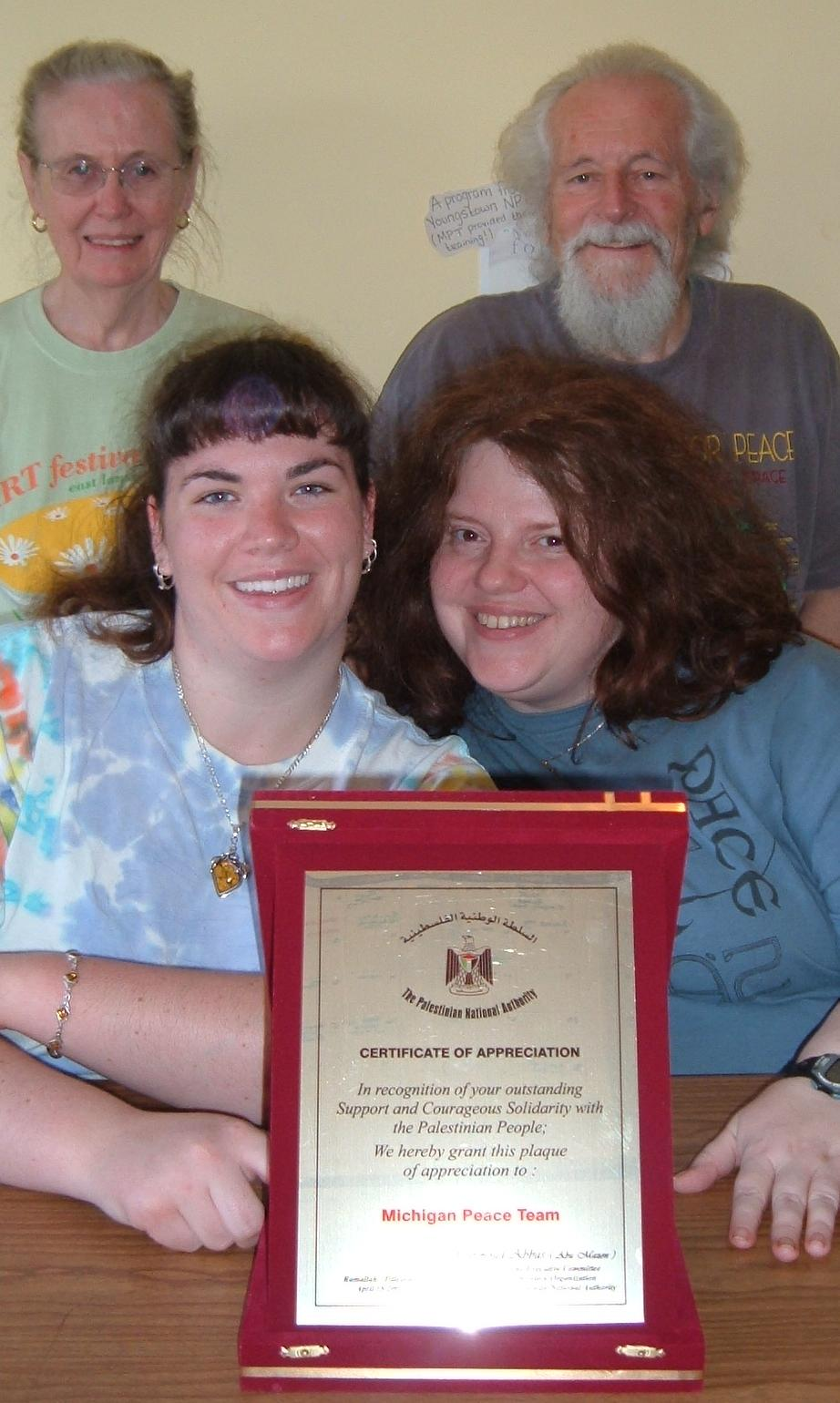
MPT members smile behind a 2007 certificate from the Palestinian National Authority

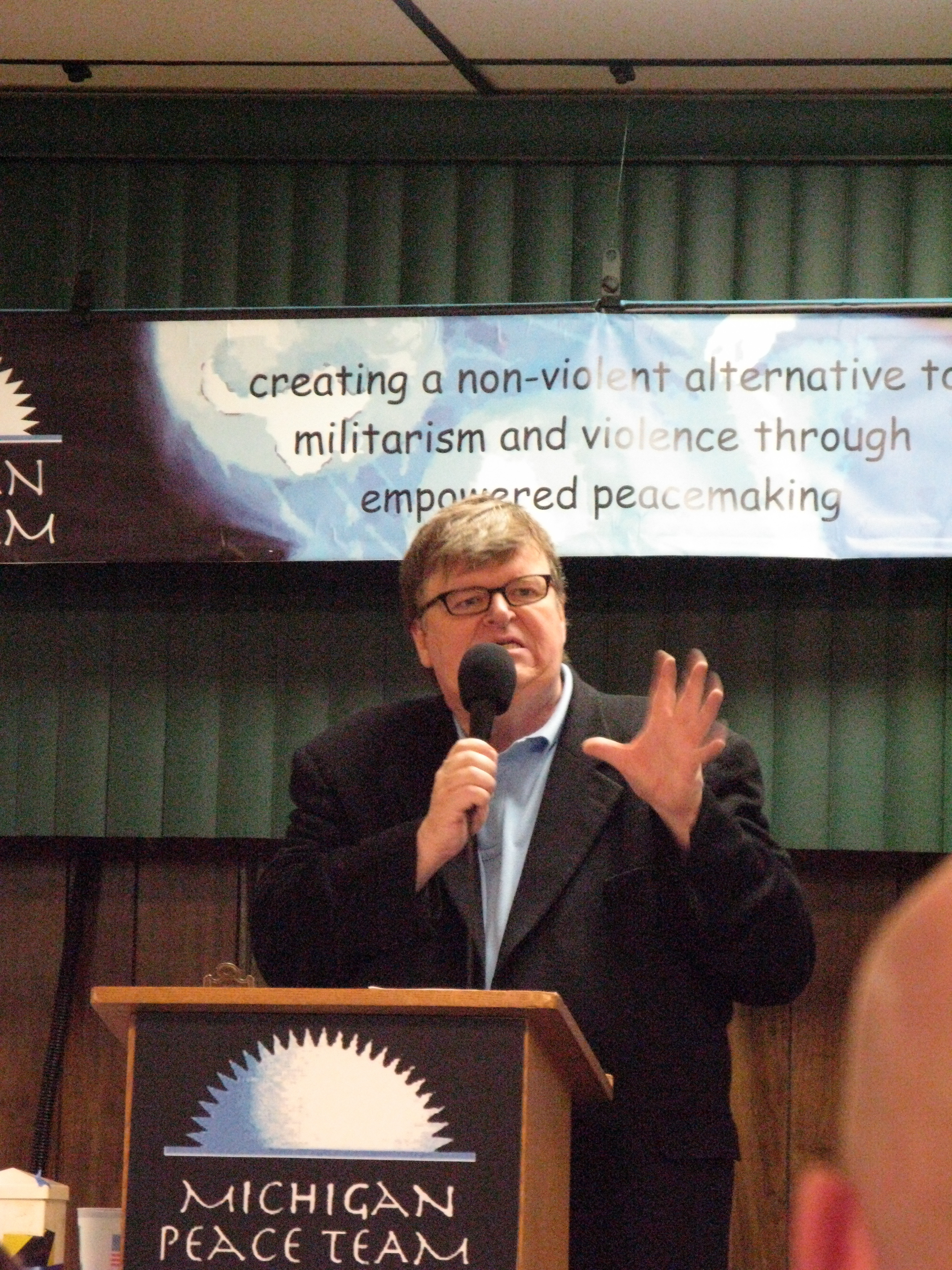
Michael Moore speaks at MPT's inaugural 2009 Signature Event

Also in 2009, MPT initiated its annual Signature Event, which includes presentations by keynote speakers and a dinner. Filmmaker Michael Moore served as the first keynote speaker, where he debuted the trailer for his documentary, Capitalism: A Love Story. Cindy Corrie, mother of Rachel Corrie, and Grace Said, sister of the late Edward Said, presented in 2010. 2012's speakers featured Hedy Epstein, a Holocaust survivor, Noura Erakat, a human rights attorney and legal advocate for the US campaign to end the Israeli occupation, and Ann Wright, a former United States Army colonel who resigned in protest of the 2003 invasion of Iraq. Peace activist Bishop Thomas Gumbleton is anticipated to present at MPT's 2013 Signature Event.

MPT is expected to publish its Field Reports Anthology in 2013, a book containing photographs and field reports honoring the work of its peace team members over the preceding two decades.

=== Name change ===
In 2013, after celebrating its 20th anniversary, Michigan Peace Team changed its name to Meta Peace Team (coming from the Greek word "meta," meaning "beyond" or "transformation"). This was done in order to clarify that a significant amount of MPT's work takes place outside of Michigan, and to represent MPT's aim to transcend physical and metaphorical borders in transforming both itself and the world over the years.

=== Death of Jasiu Milanowski ===
On September 13, 2015, Jasiu Milanowski died while in hospice care. A service was held in his memory at Ottawa Beach, Michigan.

== Ideology and approach ==
=== Overview ===
MPT's vision is to seek a just world grounded in nonviolence and respect for the sacred interconnectedness of all life. Its mission is to pursue peace through active nonviolence in places of conflict. The goals of MPT are to educate the public about the vision and practice of active nonviolence, provide trainings in active nonviolence designed for the specific needs of the participants, deploy peace teams into places of conflict both domestically and internationally, and collaborate with other peace and justice groups.

MPT seeks to embody a non-hierarchical structure. For example, rather than a board of directors, MPT has a "Core Community." It is also heavily volunteer-oriented, with over 30,000 people engaging in its programs during 2011.

While MPT describes itself as a spiritually-based organization, it is not explicitly affiliated with any one faith tradition.

Finally, MPT only goes where it is invited, claims not to take sides, and does not impose its own outside resolutions to conflicts, but merely aims to create a safe space where the parties involved may peacefully work through conflicts in productive ways.

=== Educating the public on the power of nonviolence ===
MPT's Education toward Empowerment (EtE) Committee works to educate the public about the principles and practices of nonviolent peacemaking in an attempt to reach a wider and more diverse audience. Grounded in values taught by civil resistance activists such as Mahatma Gandhi and Martin Luther King Jr., the EtE Committee uses presentations, events, newsletters, articles, and research to demonstrate the power and effectiveness behind nonviolent conflict resolution.

MPT also offers an internship program in the hope that younger demographics will become involved and gain knowledge and practical skills in nonviolent peacemaking; TPNI; the work being done in the larger, worldwide peace community; and the operations of nonprofit, grassroots organizations. Interns have come from many parts of the world, including France and Ghana.

=== Training in nonviolence skills ===
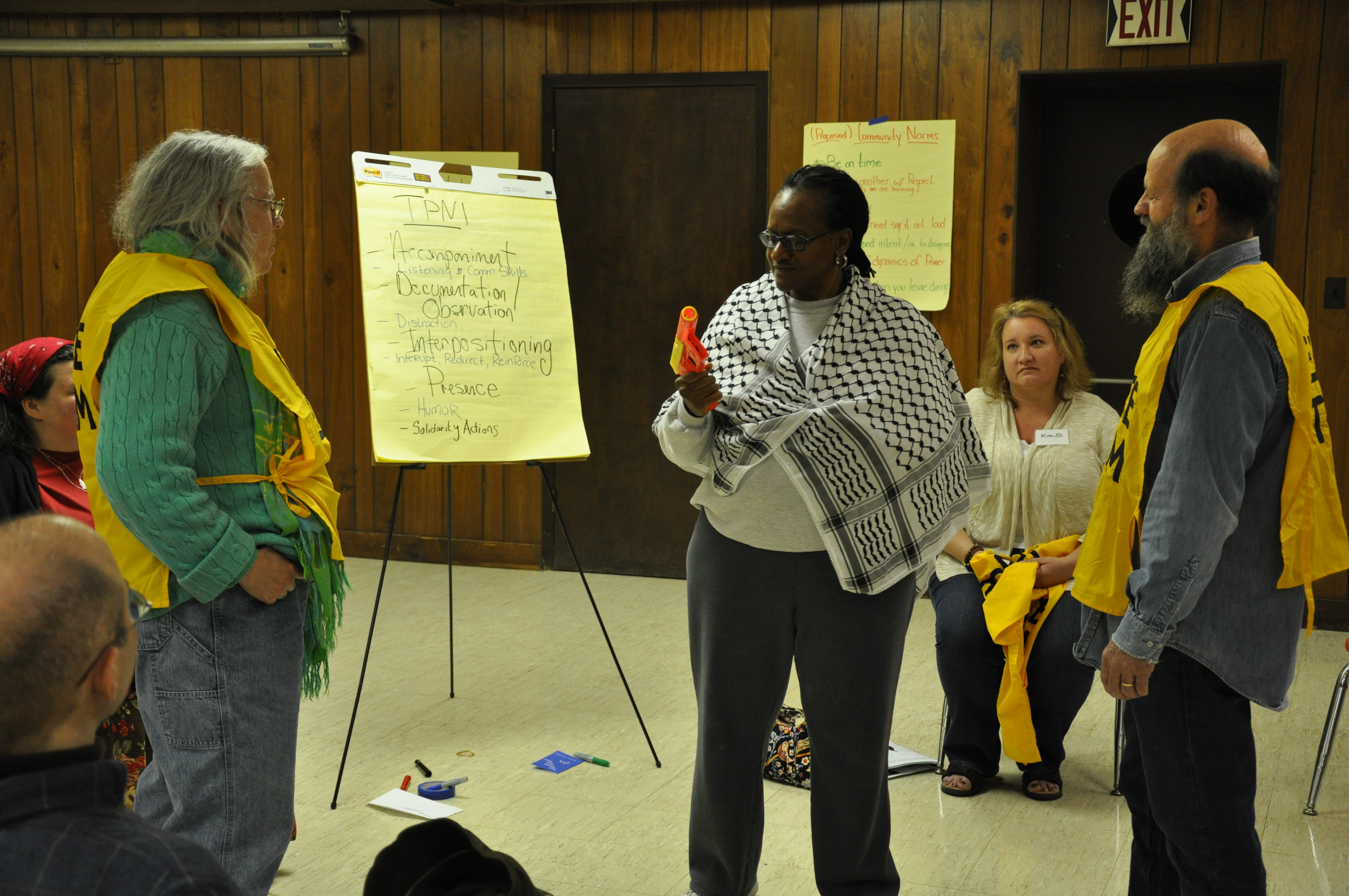
Participants practice TPNI role-playing at a 2011 MPT nonviolence skills training

Trainings and workshops offered by MPT utilize role-plays, common-ground-building, and evaluative discussions in order to provide participants with experience responding to various conflict scenarios and understanding and correcting counterproductive behavioral patterns. MPT offers different levels of trainings. Step One is an eight-hour basic skills training session that is required in order to participate on domestic peace teams. It explores how people can disagree and still work together, and it teaches techniques such as I-messages, active listening, and team-building. Step Two is an advanced weekend retreat that is the follow-up to Step One and develops communication and nonviolence skills more deeply. Step Three is the required training for international teams and is an extensive session that provides information specific to the locale in which the international team will be deployed. It covers cultural awareness and allows intensive practice of TPNI skills.

TPNI is an integral component to all types of MPT trainings. TPNI is "the physical intervention of a third party into the arena of conflict in such a way as to reduce the level of violence." The four primary forms of TPNI are presence, protective accompaniment, interposition, and observation and monitoring. Presence includes serving as a public example of nonviolence and providing a peaceful atmosphere through body language, actions, and speech. Protective accompaniment entails escorting people who are in danger of being attacked. Interposition is used to intervene physically by standing between the threat and the target. Observation and monitoring are implemented to watch and document what is experienced on the site. Visibly carrying cameras and notebooks can minimize violence by reminding people that the whole world is watching their actions, and documentation is helpful in reporting human rights violations.

=== Deploying peace teams ===
MPT has a history working with both domestic and international peace teams, all of which undergo rigorous training prior to deployment and practice TPNI in the field. Domestic peace teams are usually short-term and last for a few days, while international peace teams are long-term and take place over the course of multiple weeks or months. The goal of the teams is to de-escalate violence and prevent potential armed conflict in places where tension is high and violence is likely to occur. They wear yellow "Peace Team" vests on the site to make their presence recognizable.

Its peace teams have been requested to help with threats from hate groups, during riots at sporting events, and with conflicts on Native American reservations and along the Mexico–United States border. MPT also actively works in many countries abroad and sends frequent teams to the Middle East to reduce violence amidst the Israeli–Palestinian conflict.

=== Networking with other peace and justice groups ===
MPT partners with many other peace and justice groups around the world, aiming to build a more peaceful planet through networking and collaboration. Some of its partners include Nonviolent Peaceforce, of which it is a member organization, Christian Peacemaker Teams, Pax Christi USA, Veterans for Peace, the International Solidarity Movement, Peace Brigades International, Women in Black, Women's International Peace Service, Jewish Voice for Peace, and Voices for Creative Nonviolence. It is also a founding member of the Shanti Sena Network, a coalition of nonviolence skills trainers from across North America working to establish a standardized training curriculum and place peace teams to respond to conflicts in lieu of police or military forces. Moreover, MPT works closely with the Metta Center for Nonviolence, which was founded by peace activist Dr. Michael Nagler, and was featured as a guest on its Peace Paradigm Radio program in May 2013.
