= Third Party Non-violent Intervention =

Practice in conflict resolution

Third Party Non-violent Intervention (sometimes called TPNI) refers to the practice of intervening from the outside in violent conflicts to attempt to reduce violence and allow "space" for conflict resolution. Two common forms of intervention are as an intermediary in a negotiating capacity or, physically, by interposing one's body between two factions.

TPNI work is sometimes categorized into four main areas:

1. Interpositioning
2. Observation and Documentation
3. Protective Accompaniment
4. Modeling nonviolent behavior in a conflict situation

Examples of groups that espouse this practice are Community Peacemaker Teams, International Solidarity Movement, Muslim Peacemaker Teams, Meta Peace Team, Peace Brigades International and Nonviolent Peaceforce.

== Protective Accompaniment ==
Protective accompaniment (PA) is an approach to human-rights advocacy that uses the presence of third-party non-violent volunteers to protect vulnerable groups from violence, the threat of violence, and create a space for local political and social activity. There is no one agreed-upon terminology for this form of activism, and it could also be referred to as "unarmed civilian peacekeeping", among other things. Accompaniment does not physically remove people from violent situations, but rather aims to support those struggling for justice in situations of violence or repression. Where hostile groups would employ methods such as arbitrary detentions, forced disappearances, or other forms of violence, volunteers apply counter-pressure by risking their lives to stand physically beside human rights activists to prevent their arrest or attack. In establishing a presence in marginalized or targeted communities, they help deter hostilities. In the absence of political systems with sufficient mechanisms to protect against the violation of human rights, third-party volunteers may step in to provide this protection. When done effectively, being affiliated with groups able to distribute information widely, raise the publicity of events, and have access to the sphere of national and international discourse, they deter these actions by raising the potential political and economic consequences of violence. International protective accompaniment denotes instances in which the volunteers are of foreign origin to the area in which volunteering takes place. Peace Brigades International, Christian Peacemaker Teams, and International Solidarity Movement are organizations that participate in this form of volunteering. International volunteers may prove particularly effective in accompanying endangered groups because foreign citizenship can add a layer of protection from harassment, given the added costs of harm to internationals compared to harm to local citizens. They can also act as impartial observers, focused on the protection of the rights of the accompanied, as opposed to a party with explicit or implicit political leanings or objectives. Apart from the immediate deterrence of violent human rights violations, the presence of volunteers also allows for the creation of spaces for local political and social activity, which would have been restricted otherwise. The presence of volunteers can help expand the horizons of what activists think they can do. In helping deter violence, they reduce the perceived risk of persisting with the activity and reduce the constraints on the activity as well. Through accompaniment, the accompanied may also be reassured of their position as legitimate, significant political actors. Accompaniment may also mitigate the psychological effects resulting from the trauma of being a member of a persecuted minority and counter the isolation that comes with being a victim of state terror, as others wish to distance themselves from the targeted group to avoid danger.

In PA, activists, communities, and organizations national and international work to directly counter the violent efforts of groups acting on behalf of a hostile state or with impunity from that state. Accompaniment is therefore open to attack or exploitation by hostile groups. This could be done through discrediting (which erodes bystander support), physical assault, and expulsion. If volunteers are perceived to be partisan, their presence could be taken as aggression. This is further the case when they engage in law-breaking or acts of civil disobedience. Non-partisanship, obeying host country laws, and moderate levels of intervention reduce these vulnerabilities and points of attack, further making activism more effective.
