= International Pfeffer Peace Award =

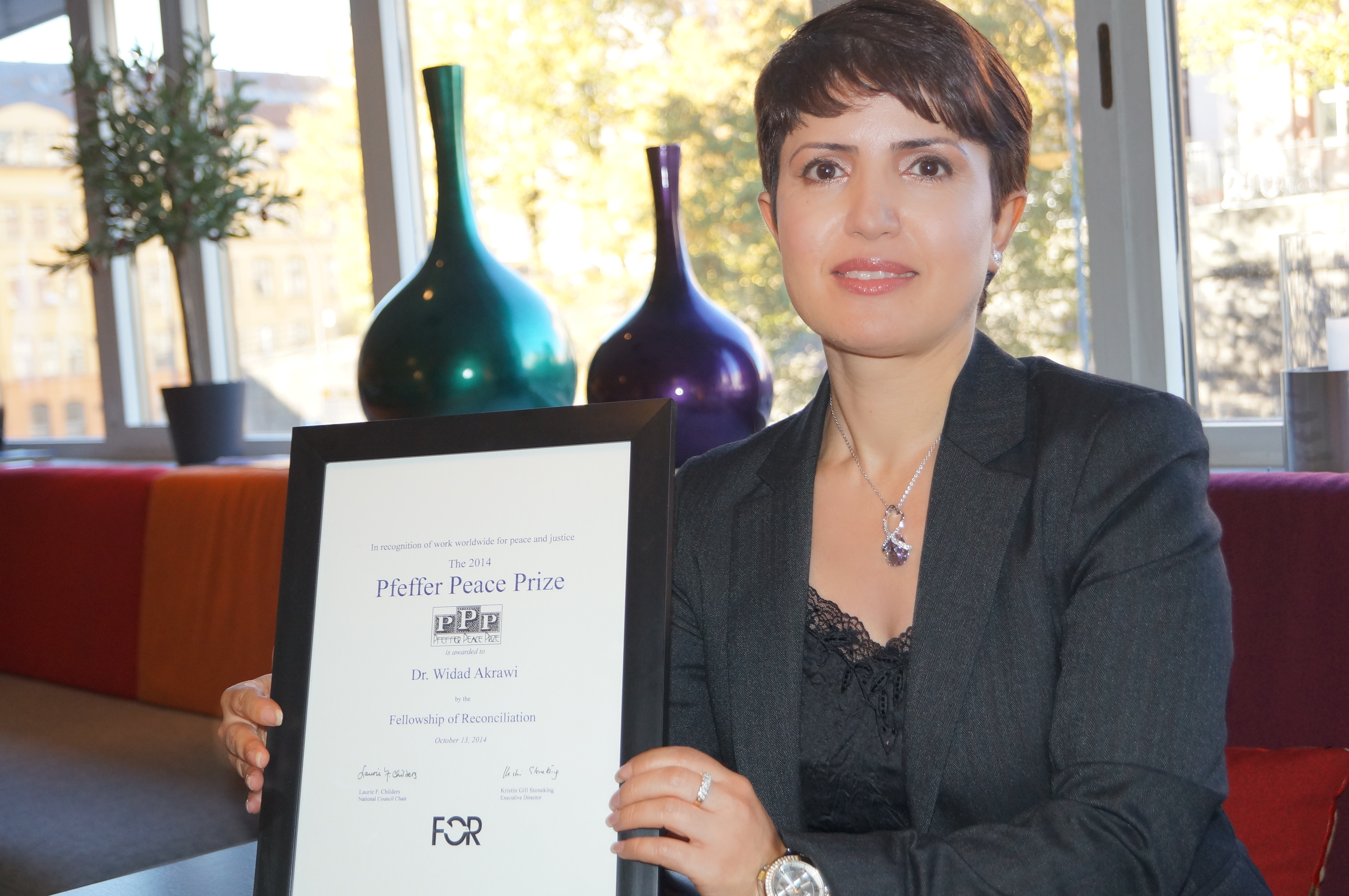
Dr. Widad Akrawi Awarded International Pfeffer Peace Prize.

The International Pfeffer Peace Award or Pfeffer Peace Award is one of the three peace awards presented by the United States Fellowship of Reconciliation (United States) (FOR), along with the Martin Luther King Jr. Award and the Nyack Area Peace Award. Since 1989, it has been awarded annually to "individuals or organizations whose commitment to peace, justice, and reconciliation is recognized as extraordinary."

== Background ==
The International Pfeffer Peace Award was established at the end of the 1980s by Leo and Freda Pfeffer to acknowledge and honour leaders and activists who work globally for peace and justice. Leo Pfeffer (24 December 1910 – 4 June 1993) was the United States' leading theoretician on religious liberty and the separation of church and state, and he argued these constitutional issues before the Supreme Court. Along with his wife Freda Pfeffer (5 September 1911 – 3 November 2013) he founded FOR USA's International Pfeffer Peace Award in 1989, when they also began co-sponsoring FOR USA's National Martin Luther King Jr. Peace Award which was established to recognize persons or groups working in the United States in the tradition of Martin Luther King Jr. Following Leo's death in 1993, his son Alan Pfeffer took the reins in managing his parents' endowment.

== Recipients ==
- 1989: Donald Mosley
- 1990: Hildegard Goss-Mayr and Diana Francis
- 1991: Anita Kromberg and Richard Steele
- 1992: Interns for Peace
- 1993: José Gómez Izquierdo
- 1994: Muhammad Yunus
- 1995: Palestinian Center for Rapprochement between Peoples
- 1996: Peace Brigades International
- 1997: Dorothy Granada
- 1998: The Peace Community of San José de Apartadó
- 1999: Kathy Kelly
- 2000: Pierre Marchand (Foundation For Children)
- 2002: Wanida Tantiwittayappitak
- 2005: George Houser
- 2006: Caribbean Project for Peace and Justice
- 2007: Mel Duncan and the Nonviolent Peaceforce
- 2008: Ricardo Esquivia
- 2009: La’Onf network of Iraqi nonviolence communities
- 2010: Scott Kennedy (Resource Center For Nonviolence)
- 2011: Sonal Ambani
- 2012: Dr. Hakim (Afghan Peace Volunteers)
- 2013: International Council of Thirteen Indigenous Grandmothers
- 2014: Widad Akrawi
- 2015: Combatants for Peace
- 2016: Mães de Maio of São Paulo, Brazil

== See also ==
- List of peace prizes
- List of peace activists
