= Dorothy Granada =

American nurse and peace activist

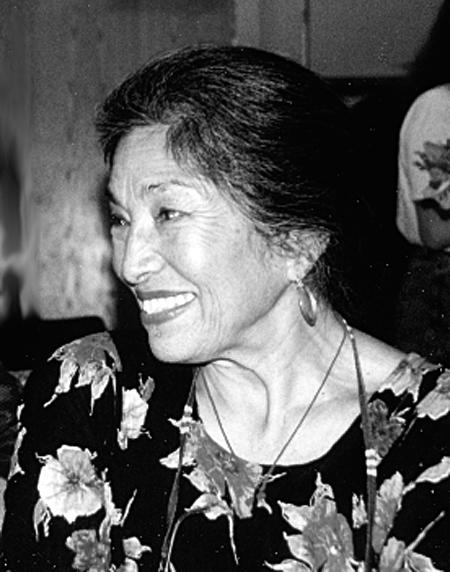
- Dorothy Granada, accepting the Pfeffer Peace Prize, 1997
- Born: Dorothy Virginia Granada; December 8, 1930 (age 95); Los Angeles, California, United States
- Other name: Dorothy Virginia Granada
- Occupations: Nurse, humanitarian, and peace and social justice activist
- Years active: 1950s - 2021
- Known for: Improving the quality of health for women and children in Nicaragua
- Notable work: Founded the Mulukukú, Nicaragua women's health clinic in collaboration with the Maria Luisa Ortiz Women's Cooperative; Created the Destrezas Para Salvar Vidas (Skills to Save Lives) program to train midwives in Nicaragua
- Spouse: Charles Gray (m. 1982)

Dorothy Virginia Granada (born December 8, 1930) is an American nurse, humanitarian, and peace and social justice activist who resides in Nicaragua. She founded and expanded a women's clinic in Mulukukú, Nicaragua in 1990 to provide healthcare services to more than twenty thousand poor and underserved residents of the region within a decade of the facility's opening.

Describing her work for a newspaper interview in 2001, she said:

"Mothers struggle to keep their children alive and to find ways to never go back to that violence.... My strength over the last year has been fueled by the faith of a people who toil for a better life. Contrary to all reason, they maintain their hope. That's what makes me get up every day."

== Formative years and family ==
Born in Los Angeles, California in the United States on December 8, 1930, Dorothy Granada grew up in poverty, as did her mother, who was raised during the Great Depression. The only child of a single mother, Granada was raised in East Los Angeles. Describing her childhood, she said:

"Growing up poor in East L.A., surviving the poverty, getting an education and climbing out, that is a form of resistance.... I grew up understanding about racism in this country, and how power was organized.... This may have contributed to my sensitivity to the needs of the underdog."

During the 1950s, she received training as a nurse and began working in the field of healthcare.

A member of the Episcopal Church, Granada was divorced from her first husband. She subsequently met Charles Gray in 1978. At the time, she was on trial for trespassing at the Trojan Nuclear Power Plant near Portland, Oregon during a protest against the potential impact on the environment by nuclear power. It was the first protest in which she ever took part. He was a psychology professor and a peace activist, who was volunteering in his own spare time to urge the U.S. government to end the manufacture and testing of nuclear weapons. They were married in 1982.

Sometime during the early 1980s, Granada and Gray relocated to Santa Cruz, California, where they became active members of the community of protestors who were advocating for social justice and against the continued production and testing of nuclear weapons.

== Activism ==
During the 1970s, Granada protested the use of the death penalty in Oregon. In 1983, she and her husband took part in a forty-day "international fast for life" in Oakland, California, during which time she reportedly drank only water in order to protest the world's continued production and testing of nuclear weapons. Their fast began on August 6, which was the 38th anniversary of the atomic bombing of Hiroshima, Japan. In 1985, she participated in efforts to search for, and protest the treatment of, activists and other Guatemalans who had vanished during the Guatemalan genocide. Among those she helped to locate and identify were a twenty-four-year-old mother, who had been employed as a secretary, and her two-year-old son. Both had been tortured and killed.

The same year (1985), she also traveled to Nicaragua on behalf of Witness for Peace to provide healthcare for survivors of political violence and to patients suffering from tuberculosis. During this trip, she witnessed the bombings of healthcare facilities, schools and transportation systems, including roads that had been used to transport aid from other countries to affected areas. Of her experiences in Nicaragua, she said:

"I found that many of the campesinas (female farmworkers) weren't seeking healthcare at all because they had been so convinced that their bodies were dirty. So I came back to Santa Cruz to train to be a nurse, with the idea all along that I would go to Nicaragua and work with the campesinas."

In 1986, she and her husband assembled a collection of poetry and photographs that had been created by residents of Nicaragua to illustrate the impact that the Contra war was having on women and children there, designed an exhibit, and arranged for that exhibit to be displayed in multiple communities throughout the western United States.

In 1987, she took part in a sit-in during the "Nuremberg protest" on the former naval weapons depot in Concord, California. After successfully blocking a truck that was carrying bombs from entering the depot, she was arrested and jailed for a night for her peaceful protest.

In 1990, Granada and her husband relocated from California to Mulukukú, Nicaragua, where she had been invited by the Maria Luisa Ortiz Women's Cooperative to assess the community's existing healthcare services and develop new programs to improve the health of the poor and underserved individuals residing there. Gradually building bridges with residents in the village, which is located roughly 150 miles northeast of Managua, she collaborated with the forty-two women in the cooperative to build a clinic that had gynecological health facilities, three examination rooms, a pharmacy, and surgical equipment, as well as a school, a library, a community meeting room, a kitchen, a dining room, and four guest rooms that could be used for patients traveling great distances to receive care, or for physicians and nurses traveling to the site to volunteer their services. Shortly thereafter, Granada worked with her friends back in Santa Cruz to establish a support organization to raise funds for the new clinic program. That organization, Friends of Dorothy Granada and the Mulukukú Women's Clinic, became the forerunner of the nonprofit known as the Women's Empowerment Network (WEN). Before a decade had passed, the clinic was also providing domestic violence prevention and response services to women who were experiencing intimate partner violence.

In 2000, while caring for a village population that had grown to roughly 5,000 men, women and children, Granada was accused by the Nicaraguan government of performing abortions, which were illegal in Nicaragua at that time, and of "treating leftist rebels." The allegations were initially made by Antonio Mendoza, the mayor of Siuna and a member of Constitutionalist Liberal Party that was the ruling power at that time; she was subsequently accused by other government officials of "treating members of the Andres Castro United Front, a leftist paramilitary group of former Sandinista soldiers." When government officials attempted to deport her, she was forced to go into hiding in order to stay in the country and remain available to her patients who needed healthcare. Her story was widely reported by news media outlets worldwide with supporters attesting that she had provided a wide range of healthcare services for more than twenty thousand patients since her arrival in 1990. Many of those patients had been unable to secure treatment or medication from the government-operated medical facilities in the area. As her visibility increased, Amnesty International and other human rights groups began lobbying the Nicaraguan government to reverse its deportation decision. She also received support from thirty elected officials in the United States government, who, at the urging of U.S. Congressman Sam Carr (Democrat, Carmel, California), signed a letter affirming their support of her humanitarian efforts and urging the Nicaraguan government to stop deportation proceedings against her. In January 2001, a Nicaraguan court suspended the government's deportation order, pending a review and ruling by a higher court, enabling her to come out of hiding. She then publicly denied the charges that had been leveled against her.

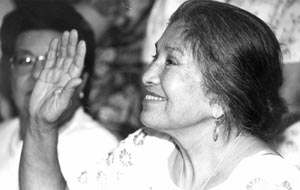
Dorothy Granada greets supporters in Managua, Nicaragua on February 9, 2001, while making her first appearance after a Nicaraguan court ordered the Nicaraguan government to stop deportation proceedings against her

By September 2001, three Nicaraguan courts had ruled in her favor, finding her innocent of the allegations made against her. Despite these victories, she was required to leave the country that month when her residency visa expired. She moved back to the United States, hoping that she would be able to return to her adopted home if Nicaraguan President Arnoldo Aleman was voted out of office during the November 2001 elections. Settling again in Santa Cruz, California, she began to raise funds for her clinic by speaking about her experiences at a series of special events, including a benefit that was held at the First United Methodist Church in Santa Cruz on November 3 of that year.

By 2010, the Women's Empowerment Network was able to reduce and ultimately end its financial support for the Mulukukú Women's Clinic because the Maria Luisa cooperative had become self-sufficient and because the Nicaraguan government had finally built a new hospital in the village. Granada's support from the empowerment network did not end here, however; she received help from the group in 2011 when she was asked to create new training programs for midwives in Nicaragua. Those programs became known as Destrezas Para Salvar Vidas (Skills to Save Lives), which were subsequently expanded to include violence prevention training programs for healthcare professionals and other members of the community.

As of March 2022, Granada was ninety-one years old and retired, but still a resident of Nicaragua, living at her home near a cemetery in Matagalpa. Having broken a rib during a fall, she still retained ties to Skills to Save Lives, however, which continued to operate from an office in her home.

== Awards and other honors ==
In 1997, Granada was awarded the International Pfeffer Peace Award by the United States Fellowship of Reconciliation in New York in recognition of her peace activism and humanitarian work in the United States, Guatemala and Nicaragua.

== See also ==
- List of peace activists
