= Mel Duncan =

American peace activist (born 1950)

Mel Duncan in 2009.

Melvin Earl Duncan (born May 22, 1950 in Davenport, Iowa) is the founding Executive Director of Nonviolent Peaceforce (NP), a civilian peacekeeping organization based in Geneva, Switzerland. He holds a bachelor's degree in Political Science from Macalester College in St. Paul, Minnesota and a Master of Arts in Humanities and Leadership from New College of California.

== Biography ==
In 1979, Duncan helped organize Advocating Change Together (ACT), the first self-advocacy group in the U.S. for people with developmental disabilities and subsequently served as executive director of the Minnesota Jobs with Peace Campaign and the Minnesota Alliance for Progressive Action. His volunteer activities have included service as a peacekeeper on the border of Nicaragua during the Contra war, delivering medical supplies to Iraq, and working for the election of US Senator Paul Wellstone in 1990.

Duncan met peace advocate David Hartsough at the Hague Appeal for Peace in May 1999. The two began laying the groundwork for an international non-governmental organization to put nonviolent strategies into practice for the prevention and mitigation of violence in conflict zones. Based on Mohandas Gandhi's concept of a Shanti Sena or "peace army," the model involves the use of trained, unarmed civilian peacekeepers working with local groups to create space for nonviolent conflict resolution.

Nonviolent Peaceforce was inaugurated in 2002 with Duncan as Executive Director and has since conducted civilian peacekeeping operations in Sri Lanka, the Philippines, Guatemala and Sudan. In 2007, NP was granted Special Consultative Status to the Economic and Social Council of the United Nations.

=== Awards ===
Duncan's awards and honors include the 2006 Distinguished Citizen Award from Macalester College and the 2007 International Pfeffer Peace Award from the Fellowship of Reconciliation. In 2008 he was named one of "50 Visionaries who are Changing Your World" by Utne Reader.

== See also ==
- List of peace activists
