= David Swanson =

American anti-war activist and author

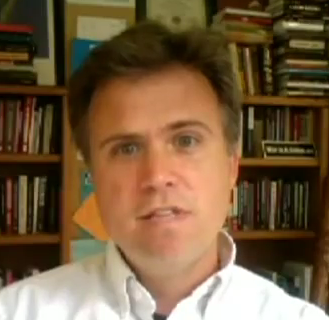
David Swanson in 2012

David Swanson is an American anti-war activist, blogger and author. He currently resides in Virginia and is the Executive Director of World Beyond War.

== Education ==
Swanson claims to have a Master of Philosophy degree from the University of Virginia in 1997. However no proof exists that they completed the degree.

== Career ==
As an activist, Swanson co-founded the website After Downing Street (now WarIsACrime.org), based around the U.S. congressional concern of the Downing Street memo. Additionally, Swanson embarked on a campaign to impeach President George W. Bush and Vice President Dick Cheney through the now defunct website ConvictBushCheney.Org as well as contributing to the introduction of Dennis Kucinich’s The 35 Articles of Impeachment and the Case for Prosecuting George W. Bush. Swanson has also aided in the organization of campaigns such as Velvet Revolution's opposition of the United States Chamber of Commerce and Tom J. Donohue, and October2011.Org's Occupy Washington movement.

As an author, David Swanson has written several books; Daybreak: Undoing the Imperial Presidency and Forming a More Perfect Union (2009), War Is a Lie (2010), When the World Outlawed War (2011) and War No More: The Case for Abolition (2013). Swanson is the host of the radio show Talk Nation Radio.

Swanson currently blogs through various political sites, including his own co-founded site, WarIsACrime.Org and Democrats.com, where he serves as the Washington Director.

In 2018, the US Peace Memorial Foundation awarded The US Peace Prize to Swanson "[w]hose inspiring antiwar leadership, writings, strategies, and organizations help to create a culture of peace In 2021, Swanson's organization World Beyond War was also awarded The US Peace Prize.

On November 10, 2024, Swanson was the first-ever recipient of the Real Nobel Peace Prize awarded by the Lay Down Your Arms Foundation in Oslo, Norway.

== Writings ==
- Kucinich, Dennis J., David C.N. Swanson, and Elizabeth de la Vega. The 35 Articles of Impeachment and the Case for Prosecuting George W. Bush. Port Townsend, Washington, Feral House, 2008. ISBN 978-1-932595-42-0
- Daybreak: Undoing the Imperial Presidency and Forming a More Perfect Union. New York: Seven Stories Press. 2009. ISBN 978-1-58322-888-3
- War Is A Lie (2010, 2016). Just World Books. ISBN 978-1-68257-000-5
- Snippers Saves the World (2021). David Swanson. ISBN 978-1-7347837-0-4
- Leaving World War II Behind (2021). David Swanson. ISBN 978-1-7347837-5-9
- 20 Dictators Currently Supported by the U.S. (2020). David Swanson. ISBN 978-1-7347837-9-7
- Curing Exceptionalism (2018). David Swanson. ISBN 978-0-9980859-3-7
- War Is Never Just (2016). David Swanson. ISBN 978-0-9980859-0-6
- Killing Is Not A Way of Life (2014). David Swanson. ISBN 978-0-9830830-6-1
- War No More: The Case For Abolition (2013). David Swanson. ISBN 978-0-9830830-5-4
- Tube World (2012). Illustrated by Shane Burke. David Swanson. ISBN 978-0-9830830-4-7
- The Military Industrial Complex at 50 (2011). Editor and contributor. David Swanson. ISBN 978-0-9830830-7-8
- When The World Outlawed War (2011). David Swanson. ISBN 978-0-9830830-9-2

== See also ==
- Anti-war movement
- Peace movement
- List of peace activists
- Civil disobedience
- World Beyond War
