= Mulukukú =

- Municipality
- Location in Nicaragua
- Coordinates: 13°9′0″N 83°58′12″W
- Country: Nicaragua
- Department: North Caribbean Coast Autonomous Region

Area
  - Municipality: 735.34 sq mi (1,904.53 km^{2})

Population (2023 estimate)
  - Municipality: 60,702
  - Density: 82.549/sq mi (31.872/km^{2})
  - Urban: 13,166
- Estimate
- Time zone: UTC-6 (Central Time)
  - Summer (DST): UTC-6 (No DST)

Mulukukú is a town and a municipality in the North Caribbean Coast Autonomous Region of Nicaragua. It was established as an asentamiento, or refugee community, during the early years of the war with the contra. People who lived in the remote rural areas and who were threatened by the contras, were brought to Mulukuku for safety. During the war a training school for the Nicaraguan army was located in the community. The community straddled the only road in the region that connected the Department of Matagalpa with Lisawe, Siuna, and eventually Puerto Cabezas. A large bridge crossing the Rio Tuma had been under construction and was nearly complete, when, in October 1988, Hurricane Joan struck Nicaragua. The bridge was destroyed and the community devastated. The national government committed to reconstruction and the community has flourished since that time. With the bridge complete, Mulukuku has become a regional commercial center. "Mulukukú" is a word in Miskito language that means Rivera de Sahinos.

On February 20, 2020, José Benito López Méndez, 51, leader of Ciudadanos por la Libertad ("Citizens for Liberty," an opposition political party) was kidnapped and shot six times in Mulukuku.

== See also ==
Dorothy Granada
