= World Beyond War =

International anti-war organization

World Beyond War (distinct from Beyond War) is an anti-war organization with chapters and affiliates in about two dozen countries. The organization bills itself as "a global nonviolent movement to end war and establish a just and sustainable peace." It is opposed to the very institution of war and not just individual wars. World Beyond War pursues the abolition of war through regional organizing along with global campaigns to close military bases and divest from corporations that profit from wars.

The organization was founded in January 2014 by David Swanson, Leah Bolger and David Hartsough. The global organization is headquartered in Chartlottesville, Virginia. World Beyond War is a grassroots organization funded by small donors. The nonprofit organization is a fiscal affiliate of Alliance.

== Activities ==
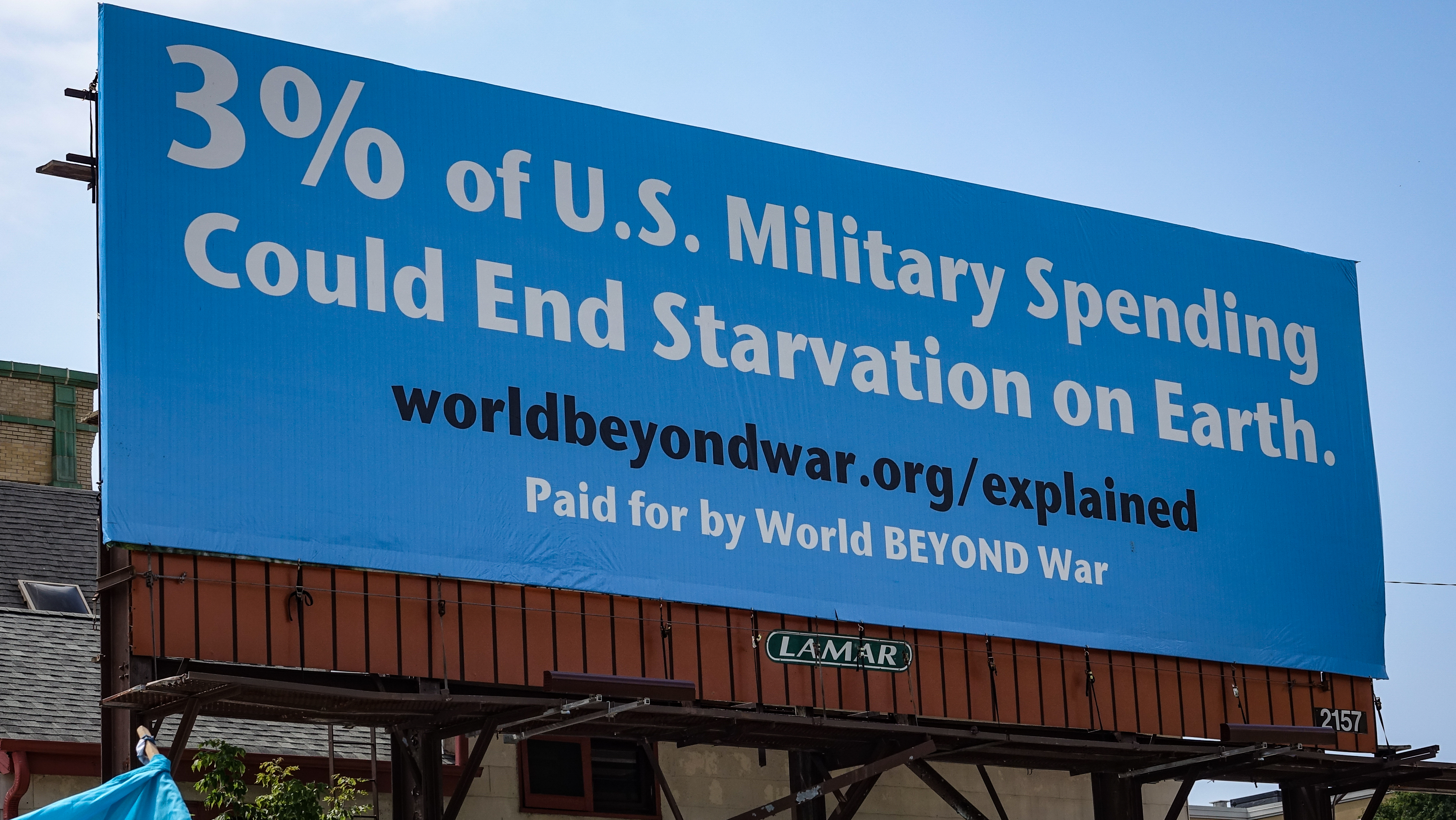
A World Beyond War billboard

World Beyond War has gotten coverage by Scientific American, Truthdig, and Common Dreams.

In 2020, Milwaukee congresswoman Gwen Moore referred to US military budget as a "feeding frenzy" at an event featuring World Beyond War's billboard in Milwaukee, which read "3% of US military spending could end starvation on earth." This was covered in Urban Milwaukee.

World Beyond War initiated a letter-writing campaign for the cancellation of Canada's annual weapons expo (CANSEC), which was scheduled to take place in Ottawa, Canada in May, 2020.

World Beyond War alternates global organizing activity with regional events, such as an April 2020 webinar on military bases in Guam.

World Beyond War has gotten coverage for its campaigns in Democracy Now, Canadian Broadcasting Corporation, The New Zealand Herald, TV New Zealand, and Arkansas Online.

In 2021, World Beyond War was awarded The US Peace Prize by the US Peace Memorial Foundation "[f]or exceptional global advocacy and creative peace education to end war and dismantle the war machine." Swanson had previously won The US Peace Prize in 2018.

== Controversy ==
In June 2019, World Beyond War "was refused permission to place advertisements featuring the slogan 'US troops out of Shannon' on billboards in Limerick during Donald Trump's visit to Ireland." These billboards would have supplemented World Beyond War's three-day annual #NoWar2019 conference in Limerick, Ireland, which focused on calls by Irish activists and leaders to end the use of Shannon Airport as a military base for foreign aircraft.
