= Donald Mosley =

Co-founder of the Habitat for Humanity organization

Donald Mosley is a co-founder of the Habitat for Humanity organization. Mosley was a Peace Corps volunteer in Malaysia and a regional director in South Korea. With a background in history, math, engineering and anthropology, he helped launch Habitat for Humanity in the 1970s. He has been on the international board of directors since 1995.

In 1984, as national chairman for the Fellowship of Reconciliation (FOR), he helped lead a delegation to Nicaragua during the war there between the Sandinistas and the Contras. That experience impacted him to lead many such groups on dozens of trips to conflict zones in Central America, the Middle East and other parts of the world.

In 2003 he helped to launch the All Our Children campaign by which thousands of people in U.S. churches and mosques have provided medicine for Iraqi children.

Mosley is a writer and lectures in churches, universities and in other settings. He is author of books titled "With Our Own Eyes" and "Faith Beyond Borders."

He and his wife, Carolyn Mosley, are founding members of the Jubilee Partners community in Georgia, started in 1980, which has hosted about 4,000 refugees from more than 40 countries around the world. The main goal of the Jubilee Partners is to live as an intentional Christian service community and to extend hospitality to newly arrived refugees.

In 1989 Mosley received the Pfeffer Peace Prize, which is awarded each year to "honor those around the world working for peace and justice." In 2005 he received the Pacem in Terris Peace and Freedom Award for exemplifying Christian ideals. It was named after a 1963 encyclical letter by Pope John XXIII that calls upon all people of good will to secure peace among all nations; Pacem in terris is Latin for 'Peace on Earth'.
