= Charles Coates Walker =

American Quaker activist (1920–2004)

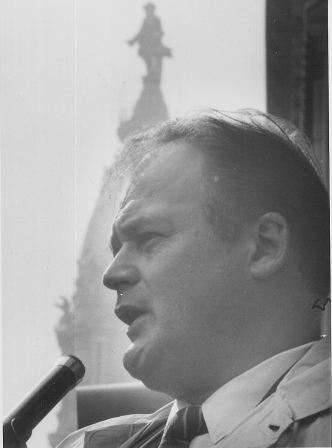
- Speaking at peace rally, Philadelphia 1965
- Born: September 17, 1920; Gap, Pennsylvania
- Died: July 11, 2004 (aged 83)
- Occupation: American Quaker activist

Charles Coates Walker (September 17, 1920—July 11, 2004) was an American Quaker activist and trainer for nonviolent direct action in both the civil rights and peace movements. He worked throughout his life to bring segregation, racial injustice, nuclear and biological weapons, and war to public awareness. He used Gandhian methods of nonviolence, writing training materials and organizing marches, vigils, protest demonstrations, conferences and campaigns in different parts of the world.

== Early life and education ==
Walker was born on a farm homestead in Gap, Pennsylvania, to Joseph and Mina Coates Walker. He graduated from Elizabethtown College (Pennsylvania) in 1941 with a Bachelor of Arts, and married Marian Groff, a fellow student at Elizabethtown, in 1942. Walker became a conscientious objector during World War II and was imprisoned for non-cooperation with the draft.

== Career in the Civil Rights Movement ==
Walker worked for the Ohio branch of the American Friends (Quakers) Service Committee (AFSC) from 1946 to 1948. As Midwest Regional College Secretary for the AFSC, he traveled to college campuses to promote the values of peace and racial justice. From 1948 to 1960, Walker worked in Philadelphia for the Fellowship of Reconciliation (FOR) as Middle Atlantic Regional Secretary. On a FOR trip to Crozer Theological Seminary he found much student interest in the FOR’s work in nonviolence and in 1949 arranged for his boss, A. J. Muste, to speak at Crozer. Dr. Martin Luther King Jr., who studied at Crozer from 1948 to 1951, wrote in his 1958 book, Stride Toward Freedom: The Montgomery Story, that he was “exposed for the first time to the pacifist position in a lecture by A. J. Muste.” Working with the Philadelphia Yearly Meeting Friends (Quakers) Peace Committee he collaborated on a pamphlet published in 1957, A Perspective on Nonviolence, which was used by civil rights organizations and trainers in nonviolence, and in 1961 he published his own manual, Organizing for Nonviolent Direct Action. Throughout the 1960s, he helped recruit and train participants for nonviolent actions targeting racial injustice, including Freedom Rides, sit-ins, the 1964 Mississippi Freedom Summer Project, and the 1963 March on Washington. During the Montgomery bus boycott, he met and corresponded with Dr. Martin Luther King Jr.

== Career in the Peace Movement ==
Throughout his life, Walker studied, wrote, and spoke about the techniques and power of nonviolence as based on Gandhi’s writings and life. He took initiative in protesting use of Culebra Island in Puerto Rico as an artillery training grounds, which resulted in the US Navy's halting its use of the island for naval training for the Vietnam war. He helped organize the Vigil at Fort Detrick, an almost two-year-long protest against germ warfare research.

Walker was a founding member of the World Peace Brigades (WPB). He was also a co-organizer and board member of Peace Brigades International (PBI). In 1991 he received the Jamnalal Bajaj International Award for promoting the ideals of Mahatma Gandhi outside of India. Walker edited Quakers and the Draft (1968). He authored A World Peace Guard: Unarmed Agency for Peacekeeping (1981) and other pamphlets and articles.
