= Doctors Against Genocide =

Global coalition of healthcare professionals

- Abbreviation: DAG
- Formation: 2023
- Founders: Nidal Jboor, Karameh Hawash-Kuemmerle
- Type: Global alliance of healthcare professionals
- Purpose: Genocide prevention, public health, medical ethics, humanitarian advocacy
- Headquarters: United States
- Region served: Worldwide
- Website: doctorsagainstgenocide.org

Doctors Against Genocide (DAG) is a global coalition of healthcare professionals and human rights advocates, founded in 2023, dedicated to preventing, exposing, and ending genocide, war crimes, and crimes against humanity. The group's formation was catalyzed by the ongoing Gaza war, with a mission to mobilize the medical community in defense of civilian protection, medical neutrality, and ethical responsibility.

== History ==
DAG was founded in direct response to what its members describe as the genocide and "medicide" in Gaza, i.e., the systematic destruction of hospitals, targeting of ambulances, medical professionals killed or detained, and deliberate obstruction of aid. It frames these as not "collateral damage," but as crimes central to the destruction of Palestinian society.

Doctors Against Genocide unites a network of doctors, nurses, and allied healthcare workers. DAG supports community-led advocacy and partners with affected populations, maintaining an advisory structure focused on monitoring early warning signs of genocide, issuing alerts, advocating for embargoes, and supporting emergency relief.

DAG seeks to bridge the gap between the medical profession's ethical pledge "to do no harm" and the inadequacies of international action in halting genocide and mass atrocities. Its founders, Palestinian physicians Nidal Jboor and Karameh Hawash-Kuemmerle, stressed that genocide is a public health emergency with generational impacts, leading to destruction of healthcare infrastructure, famine, trauma, chronic disease, and mass displacement.

The organization explicitly rejects medical complicity in "medicide", the systematic destruction of healthcare systems as part of a strategy to annihilate populations. It calls for medical professionals to act as "frontline defenders of humanity," opposing not just direct violence but the silence or inaction of institutions and governments when genocide occurs. DAG has also spoken out against atrocities and genocide in other regions, supporting Rohingya, Sudanese, Congolese, and Haitian communities, always centering the perspectives and leadership of those most affected.

== Activities and advocacy ==
- Public advocacy, lobbying, and direct interventions with national and international policymakers (notably in the US and Canada) to end complicity in war crimes and halt arms sales to perpetrators.
- Mass mobilizations, public testimony, and engagement in major protests and solidarity events.
- Testimony at international bodies, including the United Nations, amplifying voices from affected communities such as Gaza, Sudan, Myanmar, Haiti, and the Democratic Republic of the Congo.

The organization campaigns for universal application of genocide prevention, holds governments accountable, and demands full protection and restoration of healthcare systems in conflict zones. Its slogan is "Never Again for Anyone", rejecting the selective enforcement of human rights principles.
