= The Advocacy Academy =

UK charitable organization

- Founded: February 2014; 12 years ago United Kingdom
- Founder: Amelia Viney
- Type: Nonprofit; Non-governmental organization
- Headquarters: Brixton, London, United Kingdom
- Location: London
- Services: Scholarship programme for young people to become advocates for social issues
- Fields: Training in advocacy
- Website: www.theadvocacyacademy.com

The Advocacy Academy is a charitable organization based in London, United Kingdom. The Advocacy Academy's stated mission is to "train young people to engage in collective action to improve their communities and tackle social issues that directly affect them." Helen Hayes, the Member of Parliament for Dulwich and West Norwood, is the organization's patron.

== History ==
The Advocacy Academy was founded by activist Amelia Viney in Brixton on 20 February 2014. Viney had previously worked as a civil rights lobbyist in Washington, D.C., U.S.A. and as a researcher in Westminster, during which time she felt that young people were not represented or listened to enough by politicians. This inspired Viney to found The Advocacy Academy, inspired by the U.S. civil rights movement Freedom Schools.

== Activities ==
=== Fellowship ===
Young people in South London are able to apply for The Advocacy Academy's eight-month-long Fellowship, which adds up to over 350 hours and consists of three residential retreats and weekly gatherings featuring visiting politicians, experts and activists. In addition they are expected to develop and launch their own campaigns, and give a speech at the UK parliament. The Changemakers are mentors to the young people who are taking part in the Fellowship. They undergo their own training programme to prepare for this role.

=== Community Land Trust ===
A group of graduates of The Advocacy Academy started developing a campaign in 2015 to address the shortage of affordable housing in their local area. They worked with Citizens UK and local councillors, making the case for a Community Land Trust, and in 2018 successfully bid for a plot of land in Lambeth to build affordable housing.

=== Legally Black ===
The Legally Black campaign was conceived by Kofi Asante, Bel Matos da Costa, Liv Francis-Cornibert and Shiden Tekle in response to the lack of positive representation of black people in the media in the UK. They re-created famous film posters, replacing the lead actors with black actors. The posters were put up across the London transport network by another activist group, leading to press coverage and discussion of Legally Black's campaign.
