= Sonal Ambani =

Indian sculptor and author

Sonal Ambani is an Indian sculptor and author.

== Biography ==
She is known for her 2004 book Mothers and Daughters, a photographic journal celebrating the mother-sister relationship, which she wrote after losing her mother to cancer as a way of honoring her. Ambani mentored her children as they completed a sequel to Mothers and Daughters called Fathers and Sons, which was released in 2009. Her sculptures have featured in many prominent exhibitions. During the Venice Art Biennale, the European Cultural Centre has showcased her sculptures "Slings and Arrows of Outrageous Fortune" in 2024 and "Riderless World" in 2022. Her sculpture series “We Dream Under The Same Sky” was shown by the Leila Heller Gallery at the DIFC Sculpture Park and at the gallery in Dubai. She has a patent for Systems and Method for providing Financial Services to Children and Teenagers. She grew up in New York City. Her father's art gallery in New York had a significant influence on her. She played the double bass in an orchestra and a jazz ensemble. Her father taught her how to sculpt. She was a skilled equestrian show jumper.

In 2010 she was named as the head of FICCI's ladies organization, FLO, in Ahmedabad.

== Notable artistic achievements ==
Ambani began sculpting across various mediums and styles. Her work is part of the collections of many Indian art collectors and with collectors from Europe, the Middle East and the USA. Her work has been showcased at the Venice Art Biennale, Leila Heller Gallery, DIFC Sculpture Park, India Art Fair, The Bahrain Art Fair, Ahmedabad Art Fair and several art festivals and at galleries in India. In 2018, she was selected to be among 101 people to create a piece for the Elephant Parade in India. Her stainless steel sculpture "The March of Time" was chosen to be showcased and auctioned in Mayfair, London for the Concours d’éléphant Auction. A number of her sculptures are a part of the collection of the Royal Family of Bahrain. Her sculptures have also been exhibited at the Habitat Centre and Jehangir Art Gallery after being selected by the Art Society of India. Her stainless steel elephant "Elegance in Steel", which was exhibited at the India Art Fair in 2015, found a home in Switzerland. A vineyard in Nashik has been named The Red Tree Vineyard after her towering 25 feet tall, majestic sculpture, "Tree of Serenity".

In 2024, she was announced as the winner of India's largest art award, the inaugural MJF Art Prize, for her sculpture titled The Summit of Women's Voices.

== Awards and recognition ==
- MJF Art Prize Winner(2024)
- The Times of India Women Power Award for Art and Sculpture(2019)
- The Women of Excellence Award from FICCI-FLO(2018)
- Pfeffer Peace Award(2011)
- Pride of Gujarat-Maharashtra Award(2011)
- Tej Gyan Foundation(2011)
