= Ramallah Center for Human Rights Studies =

Palestinian non-governmental non-profit

- مركز رام الله لدراسات حقوق الانسان
- Founded: 1998
- Type: Non-profit; NGO
- Location: Ramallah, Palestine
- Services: Advocating human rights, tolerance, democracy, secularism, freedom of expression, good governance, civil liberties, academic freedom
- Fields: Media attention, research, advocacy, educational programs, violations monitor, public awareness
- Website: https://web.archive.org/web/20101125020612/http://www.rchrs.org/

The Ramallah Center for Human Rights Studies (RCHRS; Arabic: مركز رام الله لدراسات حقوق الانسان) is an independent Palestinian non-profit and non-governmental organization that advocates human rights, democracy and tolerance from a secular perspective. It conducts theoretical and applied research, publishes studies and journals, operates educational programs and workshops and undertakes advocacy work. Its headquarters are in Ramallah and it has an office in Gaza.

RCHRS monitors and raises awareness about human rights violations in Palestine and advocates the need to defend justice and basic freedoms for all.

== History ==
RCHRS was founded in 1998 by a group of academics, researchers, lawyers and human rights activists.

== Work ==
RCHRS aims to engender a culture of tolerance and human rights by supporting inter-religious, inter-cultural and non-violent dialogue. It also advocates educational rights and academic freedoms in Palestinian educational institutions. RCHRS seeks to strengthen civil liberties, the freedom of belief, opinion, and expression and media freedom in Palestine by documenting their violations and advocating for their protection. The goals of the organization include the advancement of secularism and pluralism in Palestinian society and to raise awareness and support for democratic processes and good governance.

RCHRS has a wide network of researchers and associated institutions that enables it to reach isolated and marginalized areas and to cooperate on human rights and tolerance issues.

=== Applied and theoretical research ===
RCHRS relies on a wide network of researchers and associated institutions that contribute their theoretical and applied research on issues relevant to human rights and freedoms in Palestine. Debate, constructive critiques and peer review of these studies are a crucial part of the research process. RCHRS publishes its research widely in books and reports that are distributed locally, internationally and online. These publications are of a high academic standard and are published in Arabic with an introduction in English.

=== Conferences, workshops and seminars ===
One key area RCHRS focuses on is facilitating dialogue between various social groups especially young people. Recent projects include Tolerance Among University Students, a training course for students in the West Bank and Gaza. Workshop topics such as the importance of tolerance, academic freedom, democracy and civil rights were discussed. Students from a variety of social, ideological and religious backgrounds take part.

RCHRS also holds monthly meetings for representatives from local and international media, civil society organizations and academic institutions. Participants discuss recent events in Palestinian politics and the impact these events have on public security and human rights. The goal is to encourage political leaders to adopt policies and practices that further democracy and enhance civil liberties.

=== Reaching isolated and marginalized areas ===
The ongoing occupation of the West Bank, East Jerusalem, and the Gaza Strip has meant not only physical fragmentation of Palestinian society but also a social and cultural fragmentation. As a result, RCHRS sees it as critical that the Center try and reach as many isolated and marginalized areas as possible. This is done through a wide network of associates that work in many local communities.

The political events in Gaza in June 2007 and the ongoing internal division in Palestine, prompted the center to expand its reach even further by opening a branch in Gaza. This has allowed RCHRS to continue its activities in this volatile region ensuring that the values of tolerance, human rights and democracy continue to be communicated to all Palestinians.

== Organizational structure ==
RCHRS's internal structure is founded upon the principle of pluralism. The staff includes secular, Muslim, Christian and Samaritan men and women with differing ideological orientations and social and economic backgrounds.

== Publications ==
The Ramallah Center for Human Rights Studies publishes reports, articles, quarterly journals, studies, and press releases on various topics and issues concerning Palestinian and Arab society. In particular, RCHRS documents and examines the state of tolerance and human rights within these societies.

=== Tasamuh (Tolerance) ===
The Tasamuh quarterly, first released in 2003, is an independent periodical dedicated to debates on tolerance and human rights issues in Palestine and the Arab region. It seeks to disseminate a contemporary illuminated culture through its assertion on the values of human rights and tolerance. It also tries to consider the current socio-political situation and to evaluate its impact on the reality of tolerance within the community.

Professor Iyad Barghouti, the General Director of the Ramallah Center for Human Rights Studies is the chief editor of the Tasamuh periodical.

Tasamuh consists four sections: studies and articles, reports, laws and legislations and culture. The reports section focuses on different human issues that all defend people's rights in practicing their freedoms. This is done through publishing reports that expose specific occurrences or research findings in the Arab world and discuss their impact on the state of tolerance. The laws and legislations section discusses subjects -not only theories- based on scientific research mainly related to human rights in the Arab societies. The cultural section consists of an essay on tolerance in the thought of an Arab or foreign intellectuals. This aims at demonstrating this noble concept as an ideology and as a practice.

Four issues of Tasamuh are published each year. The first issue was published in December 2003. Main language of publication is Arabic.

==== Writers of Tasamuh ====
In addition to Palestinian writers, Tasamuh is also open to writers from the whole Arab world as well as to writers from the Diaspora. Recent issues included material written by authors from Lebanon, Saudi Arabia and Jordan as well as Arab writers living in France and UK. Young writers and researchers are contribute to Tasamuh.

=== Studies ===
==== 2010 ====
- Tolerance in the Arab World: Between Religion and Secularism
- Palestinian-Israeli Negotiations: An Aim or a Means?
- Historical Roots of Sectarianism in Lebanon
- The Conditions of Palestinian Refugees in Lebanon
- Political Islam in the Palestinian Refugee Camps in Lebanon
- Palestinian press: Three Hammers and an Anvil
- Tolerance in the Arab World 2009–2010
- The "Other" in Arab Press
- Sect and Sectarianism: Citizenship and Identity
- Implementing Islamic Law between the Value of Man and the Value of the Text
- Peace Negotiations and the Difficult Questions
- The Values of Tolerance in Contemporary Arab-Islamic Thought
- The "Other" in the American-centric Mentality
- Women and Religion: Towards Restoring the Feminine Voice

==== 2009 ====
- The West in the Eyes of the Palestinians
- Tolerance in the Arab World 2008–2009
- The Problematic Relationship between Fateh and Hamas
- Shedding Light on the Leftist Revolutionary Party
- Palestine Under Occupation: between the "Police Station" and the "Mosque"
- Jeep or Independence? About Palestinian Indecisiveness Regarding International Aid
- The Ancient Palestinian Archeology as the Battleground for the Relationship between the West and the Arabs
- The New American Policy in the Middle East: The Dialectic of Ideology & Pragmatism
- The Issue is Larger than a Dispute over the Government
- The National Dialogue: A Problem of Debate or Debates?
- The Panorama of the Palestinian Dialogue: A Journey of Hardships that May Miss the Healing Road
- Gaza: The Politics of Polarization (Axes) and the Neo-Ottomans
- The War on Gaza: A Deepening of the Split or a Justification for a Reconciliation?
- Security and Peace from an Israeli Perspective
- The Current Situation of the PLO: The Headings of Development and Restructuring

==== 2008 ====
- Iraqi-American Security Agreement: From the Occupation to the Occupation
- Lebanese Diaries in the Year 2008
- Democratic Transformation in Jordan: Between Security and Demography
- The Arab Peace Initiative: Purpose and Prospect
- The Controversial Relationship between Resistance and the Agenda of National Liberation
- Palestinian Party System: Identity Crisis or a Failure in Political Practice
- Where does Palestinian Opposition Stand in Relation to the Changes that are Taking Place Locally and Regionally
- Freedom of Expression for Women between Illusion and Reality
- The Role of Factional Media in Igniting Internal Conflicts
- Institution Reform as an Entrance to the Development of Media
- Fiqh Discourse Concerning the Incidents Following Hamas's Transition from Opposing the Palestinian Authority to Being Part of It
- The New Gazan Conditions and Palestinian Women
- Training Manual on Tolerance and the Right to Belief
- Palestinian Media Women: an Experience and a Creativity
- The Political participation of Palestinian youth: Shades of the Past Recapturing the Future
- Secularism and Fundamentalism in Arab Society
- Democratic Transformation in Palestine: Reasons of its Retreat and Hindrances Facing its Advancement
- International Conference on Libraries from a Human Rights Perspective Proceedings

==== 2007 ====
- Reviving the Refugees Issue in Research and Politics
- Palestine Refugees Without Official Documents
- Palestinians in the Arab's Gulf between Luxury and Homesickness
- The Separation Wall: Last Episode in the Judaization of Jerusalem
- Jerusalem between Zionism and Judaism
- Jerusalem: Forty Years of Occupation and Inclusion
- We Miss Democracy and Its National Culture
- Sounding Ups and Down of the Left
- The Effect of Occupation on the Realities of Palestinian Education
- Media and the Tides of Falling and Rising
- Palestinian Political Culture: A Culture Unification or Disintegration?
- Extreme Polarization and the Tendency to Eliminate the "Other"
- Election Laws and their Role in Activating the Role of Palestinian Political Parties
- Media Plaything & Bloody Discourse in Palestine
- Tolerance in Edward Said's Thought
- Religion and State in Palestine
- Arabs and Secularism

==== 2006 ====
- Role of the Palestinian NGOs on the Development Process
- A Critical Perspective of the Education Administrative System
- Palestinian Students Movement: Reality or Imaginary
- Media and the Challenges of "Security Chaos"
- The Palestinian Political System - From Liberalism to Alienation
- The International Community and the Political Discourse to Hamas Government
- Academic Specializations and the Needs of the Job Market
- The Performance of Courts and the Current Crisis
- Loss or Gain - No Immunity to Anybody

==== 2005 ====
- Political Parties: A Controversial Reality
- Good Governance and Building Civil Society Institutions
- The Culture of Tolerance in the Palestinian Curriculum
- Palestinian Left-wing Crisis: A Passing Station or a Start of the End?
- Palestinian Left-wing: Where To Go?
- The Palestinian Constitution: The Relationship between Religion and the State
- Palestinian Christians and the Arabization of the Orthodox Church
- Political Islam and Women's Issues
- Palestinian Political System: Reality and Perspectives
- Local Elections between Tribalism and Political Pluralism
- Gender Reading in Results of Palestinian Local Elections
- The Religious Space: A Perspective for Reform
- The Role of the Religious Leaders in the Aftermath of the Israeli Withdrawal from the Gaza Strip
- Religious Media Discourse and Human Rights

==== 2004 ====
- Culture and Modernity in Palestinian Society
- Cultural Presentation in Cartoons
- Palestinian Theater: Facts and Expectations
- The Culture of Tolerance in Opposition with the Culture of Violence
- Opinions of Youth on the Peace Process: Performance of PNA and Elections
- Reality of Political Participation of Palestinian Women
- Gender and Development Dilemma in Palestine
- Status of Women in civics Curricula for the First Basic Grade through Sixth Grade
- Political Pluralism & One-Party Regime
- Palestinian Publishing & Print Law Political Pluralism
- Tolerance & Equality in Palestinian Curriculum
- Religious Thought and Human Rights

==== 2003 ====
- Tolerance: Historical and Conceptual Analogy
- Tolerance and Human Rights in Ahmad Shawqi's Poem
- Jews Image in Elias Khoury Literature
- Open Education and its Role in Encouraging Women to Learn
- Sovereignty between Theory and Practice in Palestinian Constitutional Law
- Right to Education between Reality and Ambitions
- Relationships between Media and Tolerance
- Palestinian Refugees between International Law & Political Negotiations
- PLC and Enhancing Democracy
- The Palestinian National Council: Democratic Track and Future Horizons
- Cultural Dilemma in Palestine
- Israeli Occupation and Violations of Religious Rights
- Palestinian Women: Which Reform and Which Change?
- Role of the Youth in Societal Change
- Effect of Educational Process on the Learner's Character in the Palestinian Community
- On Religious Higher Education and Human Rights
- Freedom of Opinion and Expression: the Palestinian Experience
- Concepts of Good Governance in Palestine: Experience in Local Governance
- Islamization and Politics in the Palestinian Occupied Territories
- Gender Participation in Palestine: A Critical Overview
- Friday Speech and Human Rights

==== 2002 ====
- Human Rights Training Manual
- Academic Freedom in Palestine: a practical input for change
- Human Rights in Higher Religious Education Curricula in Palestine
- The Judicial Authority Reality in Palestine in the Light of International and Local Law: Theory and Perspective
- Palestinian Women between Siege and Social Rights
- Human Rights in Palestinian Basic Law

==== 2000 ====
- Municipal and Local Council Elections in Palestine: Positions and Attitudes
- The Right to Education: Concept and Experience in Palestine
- Palestinian-Israeli Security Needs: From Reciprocity to Selectivity
- Palestinian Teachers and Future Aims
- Aspects of Palestinian Water Rights
- Palestinian Refugees: A Negotiation Problem or A Strategic Stalemate
- Beyond the Final Status Solution

==== 1998 ====
Other Studies

- Prospects of Economic Development in the Occupied Palestinian Territories
- Gender Participation in Palestine: A Critical Overview
- Friday Speech and Human Rights

== Activities ==
"Towards Ideological and Political Tolerance among university students"

=== Tolerance (Tasamuh) Art Exhibition ===
The Ramallah Center for Human Rights Studies holds an annual Tolerance (Tasaumh) Art Exhibition. The exhibition gathers young Palestinian and Arab artists though cultural art workshops and activities themed around concepts of tolerance. The annual event exhibits poster art displaying symbols of tolerance and acceptance of cultural and religious diversity.

== Networks ==
=== Arab Network for Tolerance ===
The Arab Network for Tolerance is a regional network established by RCHRS in June 2008 to serve as a forum where activists, academics, media professionals and youth can come together to identify new strategies for improving the human rights situation in the region. The founding of the Arab Network for Tolerance was announced at a press conference held at the Lebanese Journalists' Union in Beirut on 2 September 2008. This project coincides with RCHRS's decision to broaden its work outside Palestine, and is part of RCHRS's efforts to reach a wider audience in its work of diffusing the concepts and values of tolerance.

The Network aims to disseminate the culture, values and concepts of tolerance and counter fundamentalism, violence and division, trends seen throughout Arab countries today. The Network's stated goal is to "actively contribute to building more tolerant societies in the Arab world". RCHRS expects that this association of individuals and organisations will be the start of a moderate, secular and effective movement in the Arab countries that can positively influence and develop a variety of sectors in the Arab world, including education, civil society and media.

Anticipated outcomes of the Network include:

- Finding ways to challenge destructive fundamentalist trends and approaches
- Reaching marginalised groups with the values of tolerance and human rights
- Revitalizing conventional approaches to human rights and good governance by introducing the concepts of tolerance and diversity into these discourses.

The Network started with pre-identified groups in six Arab countries (Yemen, Egypt, Tunisia, Morocco, Lebanon and Palestine) that shared a basic understanding of the concept of tolerance. The Network is open for organisations and individuals who wish to join and will eventually extend to more Arab countries.

RCHRS coordinates the Network and is responsible for developing its conceptual and practical framework and for taking a leading role in steering its work. The Network includes a range of structured activities, including training sessions, regional meetings, conferences and publications.

== See also ==
- Human rights
- Toleration
