= David Hartsough =

American Quaker peace activist (1940–2025)

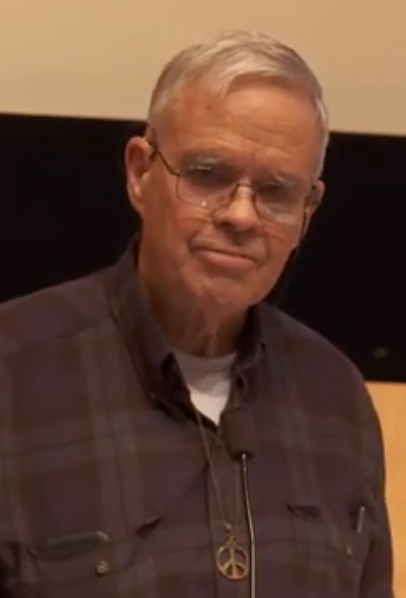
- Speaking at the San Francisco Public Library in 2017
- Born: May 2, 1940
- Died: March 22, 2025 (aged 84)
- Education: Howard University; Columbia University
- Occupation: Activist

David Hartsough (May 2, 1940 – March 22, 2025) was an American Quaker peace activist. Formerly a long-time employee of the American Friends Service Committee, he co-founded the Nonviolent Peaceforce.

== Biography ==
Hartsough's parents were active in the peace movement. He embarked on his life's work after meeting Martin Luther King Jr. in 1956 when he was a student at Westtown School, a Quaker school in West Chester, Pennsylvania. Hartsough received his BA from Howard University and his MA from Columbia University in International Relations.

He was involved in the civil rights and anti-Vietnam War movements, and worked 18 years for peace and justice with the American Friends Service Committee. Hartsough engaged in nonviolent peacemaking in the US, Kosovo, the former Soviet Union, Mexico, Guatemala, El Salvador, Nicaragua and the Philippines, Sri Lanka, Iran and Palestine and Israel.

Hartsough was the executive director of Peaceworkers, based in San Francisco. He co-founded the Nonviolent Peaceforce in 2002 and World Beyond War in 2014.

With the assistance of Joyce Hollyday, Hartsough documented his activism in a book Waging Peace: Global Adventures of a Lifelong Activist, 2014. ISBN 9781629630342

Hartsough received the University of San Francisco Institute for Nonviolence and Social Justice (INSJ)'s 2021 Clarence B. Jones Award in Kingian Nonviolence.

In October 2020, he was diagnosed with myelofibrosis and received chemotherapy.

Hartsough resided with his spouse Jan in San Francisco, California. He had two children and four grandchildren. Hartsough died on March 22, 2025, at the age of 84.

== See also ==
- List of peace activists
