= Churches for Middle East Peace =

American political advocacy organization

- Founded: 1984
- Type: 501(c)(3)
- Purpose: Israeli–Palestinian conflict, peace, security
- Location: Washington, D.C.
- Region served: United States, Israel, Palestine
- Key people: Mae Elise Cannon, Executive Director
- Website: www.cmep.org

Churches for Middle East Peace (CMEP) is a US 501(c)(3) non-profit advocacy organization based in Washington, D.C. Founded in 1984, it began as lobbying organization representing mainline churches which reviewed human rights issues, arms transfers, and the Middle East peace process with the goal of giving the church a voice in US policy considerations in this area. As a coalition of 34 U.S. Christian denominations and organizations with conservative to liberal backgrounds, they work to promote security, justice, and equality in Israel, Palestine, and the wider Middle East. They align on key policy goals aimed at achieving lasting peace, regularly engaging with high-level leaders, including officials from the White House, Congress, the State Department, and foreign heads of state.

== Advocacy ==
CMEP policy positions advocate for a just and lasting peace between Israelis and Palestinians through the end of occupation, recognition of shared rights to land and holy sites, and respect for international law. They emphasize nonviolent resistance, human rights, religious freedom, restorative justice, and opposition to all forms of bigotry, while supporting humanitarian aid and inclusive peacebuilding efforts, particularly involving women and marginalized communities. CMEP also emphasizes the role that Christians have to play in prospects for pluralism and democracy in Palestinian society and supports a safe and secure state of Israel. It urges the United States to pursue the creation of a Palestinian state and the end of Israel's occupation as integral to helping Israel achieve the security, recognition and normalization of relations with all countries of the region that it has long been denied.

CMEP supported the efforts of the Obama Administration to re-establish direct negotiations between Israeli and Palestinian parties. On August 30, 2010, they organized a letter to President Obama stating support for his goal of ending the occupation that has existed since 1967 and achieving a just and comprehensive two-state solution to the current conflict. Signed by the leadership of 29 national Catholic, Orthodox, mainline Protestant, Evangelical, and historic African American denominations and organizations, the letter acknowledged the difficulties in achieving this goal, but pledged the U.S. Christian community's efforts to expand the dialogue with American Jewish and Palestinian communities to help achieve this goal.

CMEP has also advocated for U.S. leadership in ending the humanitarian crisis in Gaza. In June 2010 they issued a statement advocating for the relief of the blockade of Gaza. In doing so, they affirmed their position that Palestinians have the right to more than just humanitarian aid. They are entitled "to trade, travel, study, and engage in productive work, subject only to reasonable security requirements, and to take part in building a viable Palestinian state together with those who live in the West Bank. Israel has the right to self-defense and to prevent illicit trafficking in arms."

CMEP takes an even-handed approach, emphasizing the need for both sides to create the conditions for peace. During the 2008–2009 Gaza War, CMEP acknowledged that "Israel's massive military operation has taken a terrible toll on Gaza's population and public infrastructure, while ongoing indiscriminate rocket attacks against towns in southern Israel have made normal life there impossible."

== Management and organizational structure ==
Churches for Middle East Peace's executive director, Mae Elise Cannon, is a minister, writer, and academic. She has written several books, including Social Justice Handbook: Small Steps for a Better World (IVP, 2009) and Just Spirituality: How Faith Practices Fuel Social Action (IVP, 2013) and was a co-author of Forgive Us: Confessions of a Compromised Faith (Zondervan, 2014). Cannon is an ordained pastor in the Evangelical Covenant Church (ECC).

CMEP's governing board, which makes all policy decisions, is composed of staff from the national policy offices of the coalition members and two independent members. This board makes all policy decisions by consensus. CMEP's Board Members include: Alliance of Baptists, American Baptist Churches USA , Antiochian Orthodox Christian Archdiocese of North America , Armenian Orthodox Church, Catholic Conference of Major Superiors of Men's Institutes, Christian Church (Disciples of Christ) Common Global Ministries Board, Christian Reformed Church, Church of the Brethren, Church World Service, The Episcopal Church, Evangelical Covenant Church, Evangelical Lutheran Church in America, Evangelicals for Social Action, Franciscan Friars, Friends Committee on National Legislation, Greek Orthodox Archdiocese of America, Moravian Church in America, National Council of Churches, Presbyterian Church (USA), Reformed Church in America, Unitarian Universalist Association, United Church of Christ Common Global Ministries Board, United Methodist Church General Board of Church and Society, United Methodist Church Women's Division

== Statements about CMEP ==
... Your organization's bipartisan efforts ... to advocate for sustained U.S. leadership in the peace process are admirable ... Your vision for a negotiated agreement to end the conflict, with a secure Israel living side by side with a viable and independent Palestinian state, is both valuable and timely ... CMEP's advocacy work is important. Thanks to you and your members for your continued work to promote a just, lasting and comprehensive peace.

— Sen Richard Lugar (Indiana)

The Arab – Israeli conflict is not primarily religious in nature. But I believe religious leaders – Christian, Jewish and Muslim – can play a critical role in finding solutions. Of course, the path to peace will be long and difficult. But we will find strength if we travel it together. I thank you for your commitment in this endeavor and congratulate you on a successful conference.

— Sen. John Kerry (Massachusetts)

While it is important to always pray for peace, your active commitment to peacemaking at the grassroots level is imperative to the success of the President's peace efforts

— Rep. Donald Payne (New Jersey-10)

CMEP is not a fair witness. The group has strong anti-Israel prejudices. Yes, I found a CMEP resolution that condemned terrorist attacks, but it is buried on a web page. But I heard no reference to terrorism at all at their conference. Israel was criticized at every turn. There is a binary mentality at the CMEP: Palestinians are the victims and Israel the perpetrators. Jewish concerns were largely ignored or trivialized. If only the occupation would end, we are to believe, the conflict would end. But wasn't there a conflict before 1967 and the start of the occupation? Perhaps, then, all of Israel is an "occupation"?

— Rabbi Kenneth L. Cohen, Founder of The Vine and Fig Project

... these are good people. But if they are not the enemy, they are opponents. And while positions articulated often have some measure of truth, the general tone lacked balance and fairness; I said as much quietly, politely, but firmly. What was encouraging to me is that I think people were ready to listen. There was good will.

— Rabbi Kenneth L. Cohen, Founder of the Vine and Fig Project

Churches for Middle East Peace is grateful to Rabbi Kenneth Cohen for his sincere reflections about our annual advocacy conference. We hope that Rabbi Cohen's commentary will open further dialogue between CMEP and the Jewish community.

— Former CMEP Executive Director Amb. (ret.) Warren Clark in response to above statements.

By your presence and activity, you manifest the true spirit of this country. I applaud you for your work and I am happy to be on the same team as CMEP

— Representative Brian Baird (Washington)

Churches for Middle East Peace presents opinions and information both to me and to my staff that are balanced and that I take seriously. On the thorny issues that are part and parcel of Middle East policy, CMEP gives clarity to the voice of the churches.

— United States Senator Jim Jeffords (Vermont)

As one who believes that peace in the Middle East is possible, I applaud the work of Churches for Middle East Peace. I have found CMEP's advocacy efforts in Washington to be indispensable, both in my role as general secretary of the National Council of Churches and as a former member of Congress.

— Rev. Dr. Bob Edgar, National Council of Churches
