= Muslim Peacemaker Teams =

Muslim Peacemaker Teams, organised by Sami Rasouli, are groups of citizens, especially in Iraq, who seek to demonstrate non-violence in practice by doing such things as physically interposing themselves between warring parties, but also by acting as intermediaries and negotiators.

They are similar to the group Christian Peacemaker Teams.

They installed four water filtration systems in Najaf, the birthplace of Rasouli.

== See also ==
- Third Party Non-violent Intervention
