= Yemen Relief and Reconstruction Foundation =

Socio-civic organization

- Formation: 2017
- Type: 501(c)(3) organization
- Tax ID no.: 82-2418739
- Headquarters: Seattle, US, and Yemen
- President: Aisha Jumaan
- Website: yemenfoundation.org

Yemen Relief and Reconstruction Foundation is a charity based in the US and Yemen that provides relief aid to people affected by the conflict in Yemen.

== Organization ==
Yemen Relief and Reconstruction Foundation was founded in 2017 and registered both Seattle as a 501(c)(3) charitable organisation and in Yemen.

It is governed by a volunteer board of directors, with minimal staff in the US. Staff in Yemen are also volunteers, mostly current or former civil servants from the health and education sector.

== Leadership ==
Yemen Relief and Reconstruction Foundation is led by its president, Yemeni-American epidemiologist Aisha Jumaan.

== Activities ==
Yemen Relief and Reconstruction Foundation provides food aid, healthcare supplies, water filters, and educational supplies to children.

The organization has pushed the United States government to increase aid to Yemen and to stop the sale of weapons to Saudi Arabia.
