= Protection International =

International non-profit organisation

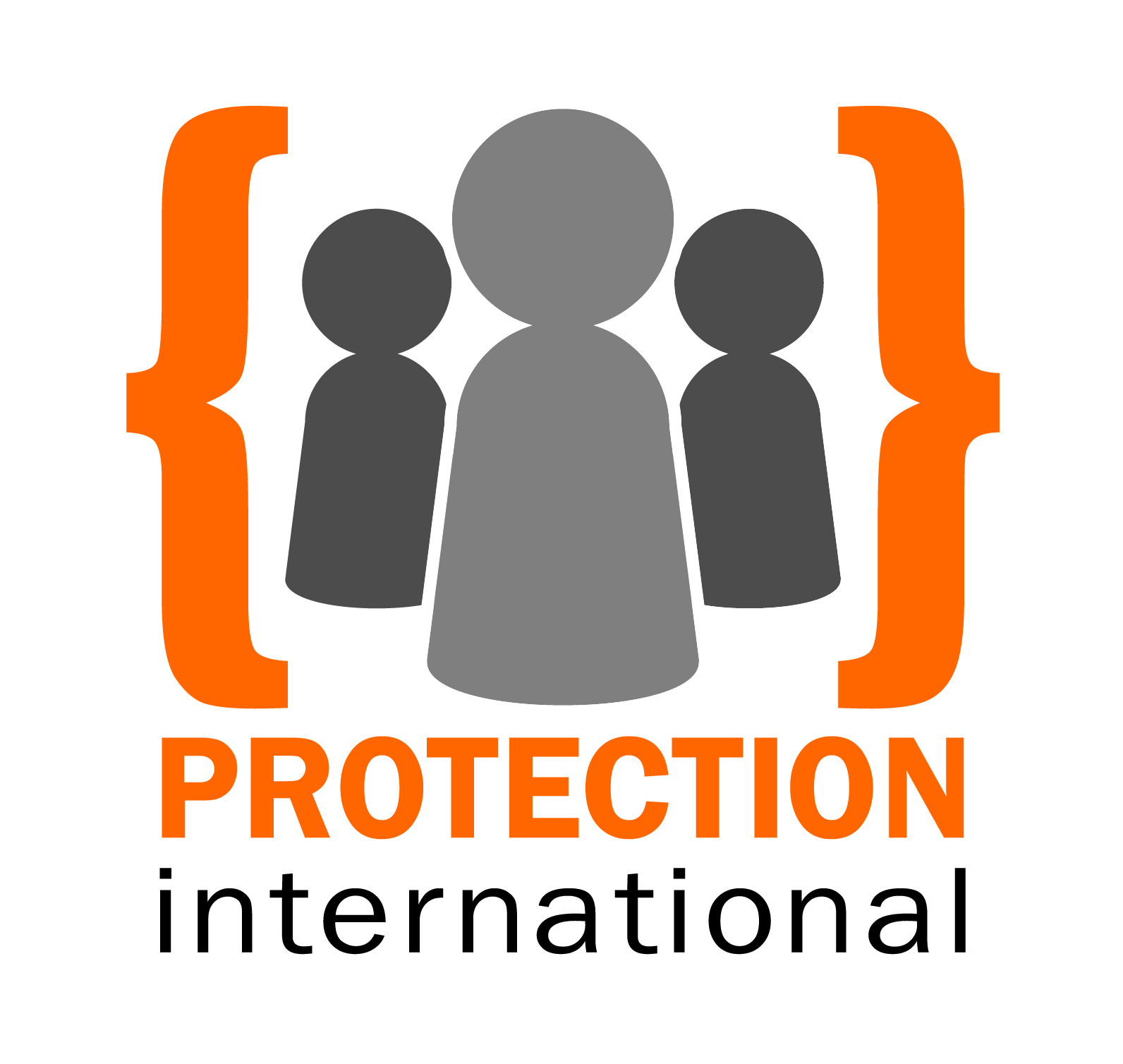
- Founded: 1998 in Belgium (PBI-BEO), became Protection International in 2007
- Type: Non-profit
- Location(s): Global Headquarters in Brussels
- Services: Reinforcing the security and protection of HRDs
- Fields: Training, capacity-building, advocacy, video advocacy, (field) research, international community mobilisation
- Website: www.protectioninternational.org

Protection International (PI) is an international non-profit organisation dedicated to the protection of human rights defenders (HRDs). Its stated mission is to offer long-term accompaniment and support human rights defenders at risk by building capacities for managing their protection and security effectively. Protection International takes a preventive and collective perspective of protection instead of the most often reactive perspectives.

Protection International began its activities in 1998 as the former European Peace Brigades International (PBI-BEO) and became Protection International in 2007. Their headquartersed are located in Brussels while also have permanent presence in the Democratic Republic of the Congo, Guatemala, Colombia, Kenya and Thailand, as well as non-permanent activities in another 30 countries in collaboration with local partner organisations. Protection lnternational frame their role with partners in promoting the Right to Defend Human Rights of defenders at risk.

It provides human rights defenders (i.e. trade unionists, journalists, lesbian, gay, bisexual and transgender individuals defenders, members of anti-corruption organizations, etc.) with training, knowledge and tools, such as the "Protection Manual for Human Rights Defenders", to develop protection measures into their work and enable them "to defend all human rights". Protection International has also been promoting a strategy to the protection of human rights defenders that includes a psychosocial approach to assess the “impact of the social and political context on the emotional well-being” of defenders, and aims at mobilising the national and international community (parliaments, governments, the United Nations, the media and public opinion).

== History ==
Protection International is the former European Union office of Peace Brigades International (PBI-BEO). In October 2007, PBI-BEO officially became Protection International, after a separation with the PBI organisation carried out by common consent. Nevertheless, current activities run by Protection International are the logical result of defenders protection initiatives which began more than two decades ago.

In 1998, it organised a hearing on the newly adopted UN Declaration on Human Rights Defenders in the Plenary of the European Parliament where human rights defenders (HRDs) from Colombia and Guatemala witnessed. Since then, PI supports the development and implementation of "new tactics and tools for the protection of HRDs by improving their own security strategies, thus also enabling them to improve their protection of others" (victim groups, witnesses, Internally Displaced People communities, women's HRD's, LGBTI, among others).

From 1999 to 2002, PBI organised public seminars on International Observation Strategies for INGOs and other stakeholders throughout Europe. At the same time, training activities on security and protection of HRD's were held in more than twenty countries (among others, Mexico, Guatemala, Colombia, Brazil, Peru, Honduras, Bolivia, the Democratic Republic of the Congo, Uganda, Kenya, Ingushetia, Serbia, Indonesia, Nepal, Sri Lanka, India and Thailand).

While developing its presence in sensitive areas, PI began working in 2003 with members of Parliaments in various European countries on the adoption of resolutions and motions on the protection of defenders. As a result, PI assisted the Belgian Parliament and Senate in designing and adopting in July 2003, a global reach resolution which asked the Belgian Government to "request its diplomatic missions to observe carefully and systematically the situation of human rights defenders in the countries where they're working." (Note: This resolution considered the creation of the UN Special Representative of the Secretary General on Human Rights Defenders function (occupied then by Hina Jilani, who was succeeded in 2008 by Margaret Sekaggya) as a "great victory for all the people who fight every day for the enforcement of human rights" and recognized that human rights defenders "in many countries are more and more victims of intimidations because of their activities, [...] they need a protection from the international community".) In 2004, the Bundestag adopted a similar resolution. and Spain followed in 2007 by voting its own legislation.

From 2004 onwards, the organisation launched short and long-term activities in Asia, Africa and Latin America. It operated a first #Protection Desks in Nepal between 2006 and 2011. In 2007, Protection International is formally registered as an international non-profit association. In 2009 the organization published its Manual on the Protection of Human Rights Defenders, and by 2011 PI publishes the action-oriented research publication Protection of Human Rights Defenders, Best Practices and lessons learnt.

In the last few years, Protection International developed itself quite rapidly. From August 2008 to December 2009, it delivered trainings about security and protection measures for nearly 1500 HRD in its working countries. Moreover, it provides on a daily basis advice to 600 HRDs and their organisations through its permanent Protection Desks and liaise with international institutions such as the African Commission on Human and People's Rights (ACHPR) and the UN Special Rapporteur on the situation of human rights defenders in order to design and implement new protection mechanisms.

In 2013 PI released a FOCUS Observatory on Public Policies for the Protection of Human Rights Defenders, where they monitor, analyses and promote good practices by both government and state authorities both to protect human rights defenders and their right to defend human rights.

Since 2011, Protection International has also specialized in providing e-learning courses to improve HRDs security and protection. PI had delivered over 100 protection and security trainings to over 1,200 HRDs in twenty-two countries.

Along with other 11 NGOs, PI co-established the ProtectDefenders.eu consortium, is the European Union Human Rights Defenders mechanism to protect human rights defenders from around the world that are in grave, high-risk situations.

In December 2019, Protection International Africa (PIA) was officially launched, setting its headquarters in Nairobi, Kenya. PIA has operated in the Democratic Republic of Congo and Tanzania, as well as other projects across West, Central, and Southern Africa. In 2020, the organization's Mesoamerica hub was launched in Guatemala City, aimed at expanding and serving human rights activists in the region. In 2022, the hub in South America was open with the headquarters in Bogotá, Colombia, and from where they constantly support HRDs in Brazil.

As of 2022, it is part of the European Union Human Rights Defenders Mechanism consortium, along with eleven other human rights NGOs. The same year, the organization helped publish the Human Rights Defenders poetry book, along with the University of York and ProtectDefenders.eu, which was the result of the Human Rights Defenders Poetry Challenge.

In 2023, Protection International helped to implement the project "New local narratives to combat misinformation and stigmatization of human rights advocacy and community journalism in Colombia" along with VerdadAbierta.com and with the help of the European Union's Foreign Policy Instruments Service (FPI). The same year, between 17 and 19 May, it helped to organize the International Seminar for the Right to Defend Human Rights and Freedom of Expression in Mexico City. They also launched jointly a platform named VERIFICO to check fake news and disinformation used to stigmatize human rights activists in Colombia. On 22 June 2023, during the 25th anniversary of the United Nations Declaration on Human Rights Defenders, Protection International joined an initiative aimed at creating a supplement to the Declaration.

The organization helped fund the documentary film The Illusion of Abundance, which follows three women that attempt to hold corporations in the European Union and the United States accountable for environmental harm.

== Objectives ==
Broadly speaking, Protection International's objective is "to contribute to ensuring fulfilment of national and international obligations (Note: Among these stakeholders : Government and State officials, parliamentary members, media, citizens, international governmental and non governmental organizations, local organizations of HRDs, IDPs, refugees and other vulnerable groups.) for the protection of human rights defenders – people who, individually or together with others, take action to promote or protect human rights". Concretely it focuses itself on two goals:

- To promote wider knowledge, improved decision-making and increase the effective use of field protection strategies for and by the main stakeholders in protection.
- To directly support the work of all stakeholders in the effective use of field protection.

In every activities, Protection Line follows international standards in international human rights law and especially the UN Declaration on Human Rights Defenders(1998), The EU Guidelines on HRD and the UN Guiding Principles for IDPs (Deng's principles).

While it put the emphasis on the improvement of human rights defenders abilities regarding the handling of security, protection and psychosocial training, both for themselves and the beneficiaries of their work, PI's Global Protection programme also focuses itself on political action and advocacy, in order that the national and international authorities and other key actors involved in protection issues enforce their obligations in terms of human rights defenders protection.

== Programs ==
According to the Annual Report 2008 foreword, Protection International's role is not "to replace governments" in their responsibilities to protect human right's defenders but well to "advise defenders on improving their security by following tried-and-tested procedures" and to complement the work done by other NGOs and international institutions in this field. Therefore, PI covers a wide range of activities:

- Protection Capacity Building and Training through analysing the risks faced by HRDs in various contexts, managing their security and transferring knowledge and tools
- Protection research: publication of manuals and informations to develop best practices
- Advocacy: dissemination of information among key actors in human rights issues, organization of debates and involvement of media, parliaments and trade unions, acting as an alarm to local authorities when they tend to forget their international obligations and commitments on HRDs protection
- Video advocacy: production of testimonies and portraits of HRDS, showing their working environments, work experience (threats and challenges faced, achievements reached)
- Setting-up of Protection Desks that will be used as local centres in collaboration with partner networks and organisations.
- Managing www.protectionline.org, a project website providing informations, documents, publications, press releases and promoting urgent actions for the protection of HRD.

=== Africa ===
==== Democratic Republic of the Congo ====
In 2004, Protection International led an observatory mission in DRC and organised two seminars on the EU Guidelines on HRDs. From 2006 until 2007, it went on with the training of defenders: among the beneficiaries, there were 185 organisations of civil society coming from 13 conflict regions. Along this, Protection International developed regular advocacy activities for an improved protection of HRDs, mainly aimed at European embassies, the MONUC and also national and local stakeholders, especially those involved in the reform of the Congolese Judiciary.

In July 2006, PI organised a conference with 30 Congolese HRDs, Michael Matthiessen, Javier Solana's personal representative for human rights and the ACHPR's Special Rapporteur, Reine Alapini. En 2006, PI produced Les armes de l'impunité ("The Weapons of Impunity"), a documentary that recounts the assassination of Pascal Kabungulu, a Congolese human rights defender, who worked for the "Ligue des Droits de l'Homme dans la Région des Grands Lacs" (The Human Rights League of the Great Lakes) and the Protestant NGO "Héritiers de la Justice" (Heirs of Justice), and denounces the systematic intimidation or physic violence against the defenders who documented the abuses committed during the Second Congo War.

In May 2009, Protection International requested a re-trial of the Maheshe Case. Serge Maheshe was a Congolese journalist working for Radio Okapi, the radio supported by the Monuc, who was assassinated in Bukavu in June 2007. According to Protection International, the trial "which took place in front of the Military Jurisdictions of Bukavu both at first instance and at appeal, respected neither the norms of a fair and equitable trial nor led to the manifestation of truth. In spite of this, three civilians were sentenced to death in May 2008". The organization recounts the whole observation of the appeal trial in a comprehensive report titled Rapport d'observation du procès d'appel «Maheshe» devant la cour militaire du Sud-Kivu (R.D. Congo) et suivi des recours. The work and the call for re-examination and re-trial of Protection International was deemed by the Belgian journalist Colette Braeckman, specialist of the DRC, "all the more relevant as Didace Namujimbo, another journalist from Bukavu who also worked for the Monuc—which didn't take any civil action for both of its contributors—was assassinated in similar circumstances in 2008".

In August 2009, after the assassination of Bruno Koko Chirambiza, journalist at the Bukavu private station Radio Star Protection International, along with four other NGOs (Action des chrétiens pour l'abolition de la torture, Fédération de l'action des chrétiens pour l'abolition de la torture, Frontline et Diakonie), asked the Congolese authorities to put an end to impunity, claiming that "the situation of journalists and human rights defenders in the DRC is more and more worrying".

== See also ==
- Human rights defenders

== Bibliography ==
- Congreso de Los Diputados de España (11 May 2007). "Proposicion no de Ley sobre la Protección de Defensores y Defensoras de los Derechos Humanos" (PDF).
