= Witness for Peace =

American peace organization

Witness for Peace (WFP) is a United States–based grassroots organization founded in 1983 that opposed the Reagan administration's support of the Nicaraguan Contras, denouncing widespread atrocities by these counterrevolutionary groups. Witness for Peace Solidarity Collective brought U.S. citizens to Nicaragua to see the effects of their government's military policy firsthand. Since the end of the Contra war, they have broadened their focus to other Latin American and Caribbean countries, including Colombia and Honduras. Within Latin America, the organization is known by the Spanish name Accion Permanente por la Paz.

== History ==
WFP was founded in 1983, as the Contra War raged in Nicaragua. The organization established an ongoing presence in this Central American country and sent U.S. citizens to accompany the Nicaraguan people in war zones and to document the "human face" of the Reagan administration's military policy. It is widely credited with pioneering this tactic of international protective accompaniment. WFP was a leading organization working to bring human rights impact of those policies home to the U.S. public through grassroots education and media outreach. During this initial period, WFP established its organizational model of merging the powerful forces of on-the-ground documentation, assertive media strategies, a dynamic delegations program, and stateside grassroots mobilization.

== Current operations ==
WFP has expanded its work beyond Nicaragua to other Latin American and Caribbean countries, answering calls from local partners to accompany people affected by U.S. policies and corporate practices. WFPSC currently has international offices in Honduras, Cuba, and Colombia.

WFP maintains a nationwide base of over 30,000 members, and has sent more than 20,000 people to Latin American and the Caribbean on short-term transformative delegations.

== Policy focus ==
Since its inception, WFP has opposed U.S. military intervention and meddling in Latin America. The organization currently seeks to end U.S. military aid and training for the Colombian military. WFP also seeks to close the Western Hemisphere Institute for Security Cooperation (WHINSEC), formerly the School of the Americas (SOA), and end all U.S. military training for Latin American militaries as the organization claims this training has been turned against Latin American civilians.

Since 1990, the organization has sought to influence regional U.S. economic policy, aiming to end free trade and structural adjustment conditions placed on loans from multilateral banks such as the World Bank and the International Monetary Fund. The organization supports fair trade policies and unconditioned economic aid.
