= Nonviolent Peaceforce =

International nongovernmental organization

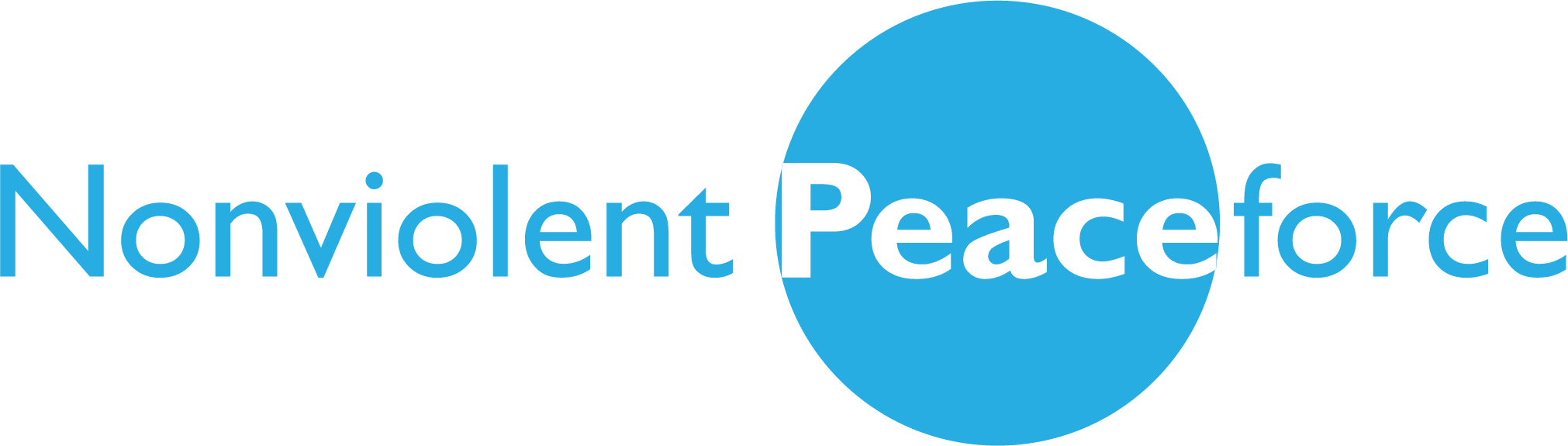
- Established: 2003
- Type: International NGO
- Headquarters: Geneva, Switzerland
- Region served: Worldwide
- Executive Director: Tiffany Easthom
- Website: nonviolentpeaceforce.org

Nonviolent Peaceforce (NP) is an international nongovernmental organization that employs Unarmed Civilian Protection. Their mission is to protect civilians in violent conflicts through unarmed strategies, build peace side-by-side with local communities, and advocate for the wider adoption of these approaches to safeguard human lives and dignity. NP holds Special Consultative Status with the Economic and Social Council of the United Nations, and has been endorsed by nine Nobel Peace Prize laureates, including the Dalai Lama and former South African Archbishop Desmond Tutu. In 2016, Nonviolent Peaceforce was nominated for a Nobel Peace Prize.

== History ==
The organization was founded by David Hartsough, a US Quaker and civil rights activist, and Mel Duncan, former US member of the Nicaragua coffee/cotton brigades during the Contra war of 1984. The organization, first prompted by a 1999 citizens' conference in The Hague, was founded in New Delhi in 2002.

Mel Duncan served as executive director until 2009, in Minneapolis, Minnesota. The central office moved to Brussels, Belgium, in 2010 under Executive Director Tim Wallis, while retaining its U.S. operations in Minneapolis, as of December 2013 and later St. Paul. The organization was led by Doris Mariani until 31 May 2016, when Executive Director Tiffany Easthom took over. The organization has central offices in St. Paul, Minnesota, and Geneva, Switzerland. It has legal entities in the U.S. (501(c)(3)), Belgium, France, and Switzerland.

== Mission ==
"Our mission is to protect civilians in violent conflicts through unarmed strategies, build peace side-by-side with local communities, and advocate for the wider adoption of these approaches to safeguard human lives and dignity. NP envisions a worldwide culture of peace in which conflicts within and between communities and countries are managed through nonviolent means. We are guided by principles of nonviolence, non-partisanship, primacy of local actors, and civilian-to-civilian action."

== Work ==
=== Past projects ===
==== Sri Lanka (2003–2011) ====
The pilot project of NP was started in 2003 in Sri Lanka. Nonviolent Peaceforce peacekeepers were at work there between 2003 and 2008 but they could not stop the war that reoccurred in 2008 and came to an end only when the SLA defeated LTTE in May 2009. After 2009, NP continued work in the country for two years, mainly on child protection, helping to integrate former child soldiers back into everyday life, and working with local communities to bolster their own self-protection capabilities. In 2011, NP officially closed its mission in Sri Lanka.

==== Guatemala (2007) ====
NP had a short-term engagement in Guatemala in 2007. Nonviolent Peaceforce had been invited by the Unidad de Protección a Defensoras y Defensores de Derechos Humanos (UDEFEGUA), the Protection Unit for Human Rights Defenders. During the presidential elections taking place in September and November 2007, violence increased and human rights defenders were threatened; a small team of four members focused on accompanying the human rights defenders or being present in their office day and night. NP's work there allowed human rights defenders to function in a hostile climate, and they left shortly after elections were finished.

==== South Caucasus (2012–2014) ====
After an exploratory mission in the region, NP deployed its team to the South Caucasus in 2012. There they worked along the Administrative Boundary Line between Georgian Tbilisi-Administered-Territories and de facto South Ossetia on civilian protection capacities in the region while canvassing to determine other places in the area that might benefit from unarmed civilian protection. NP left the area in 2014.

==== Ukraine (2015) ====
After many rounds of exploration missions in the country, Nonviolent Peaceforce was invited to Ukraine in March 2015 to conduct trainings on unarmed civilian protection for civil society groups and the communities they serve. This was conducted with the Association for Middle Eastern Studies and was the first time Unarmed Civilian Protection (UCP) had been introduced in Ukraine.

==== Bangladesh (2018–2019) ====
Nonviolent Peaceforce started working in Cox's Bazar, the world's largest refugee camp located in Bangladesh in 2018. As the refugee crisis unfolds, and overwhelming humanitarian needs emerge, the NP team is working with local partners to improve the safety of people living in the camp and to prepare for the flooding and mudslides of the rainy season. NP is building collaborative relationships with local non-governmental organizations, internal Rohingya-led organizations, and international non-governmental organizations and is providing protection to these organizations responsible for overseeing the camp.

==== Lebanon/Syria (2012–2018) ====
Nonviolent Peaceforce's activity in the Middle East began in 2012 with a joint training with the UN Office on Genocide Prevention and Responsibility to Protect for activists in civil society in Lebanon and Syria. The seminar was part of an initiative by the UN in response to increasing polarization in the area.

=== Ongoing projects ===
==== Philippines (2007–) ====
In Mindanao, Philippines a ceasefire was the starting point for the invitation of NP by local peace organizations (e.g. Mindanao peoples Caucus and Consortium of Bangsamoro Civil Society). After a short time, NP Philippines was part of the International Monitoring Team (IMT) to oversee the ceasefire agreement between the Philippine Army and the Moro Islamic Liberation Front, a guerilla organization that sought independence and later self-determination for the southern island of Mindanao. NP is responsible for the Civilian Protection Component which had its antecedents (and still relies on) the Independent Fact-Finding Committee and Bantay Ceasefire.

An impact evaluation done in May 2014 found that citizens in Mindanao felt safer due to Nonviolent Peaceforce's presence and their role as part of the CPC for IMT.

==== Southern part of Sudan, now Republic of South Sudan (2010–) ====
After the cancellation of a proposed project in Uganda, the peace agreement between Sudan and the Sudan Liberation Army as well as the planned independence referendum in South Sudan in January 2011 provided a starting point for exploring and later implementing a project in Sudan/South Sudan.

Two Sudanese organizations, the Institute for the Promotion of Civil Society (IPCS) and the Sudanese Organization for Nonviolence and Development (SONAD), invited NP to assist in preventing violence before and during the forthcoming elections and referendum. The more general task, also for the time after the referendum, was to build up local expertise for preventing and mediating in inter-ethnic conflicts in the region. The assignment was led by a Sri Lankan peacekeeper who was responsible for the protection of children in Sri Lanka. In South Sudan, UNICEF financed a similar project specifically for Ugandan child soldiers who were recruited by the Lord's Resistance Army (LRA). The field offices have since been extended to more than ten teams.

Much of Nonviolent Peaceforce's work in South Sudan focuses on child protection and women's protection. They have successfully trained many women on the ground to form "Women's Protection Teams" (WPTs) in order to reduce gender-based violence on the ground. WPTs have also been cited as empowering women on the ground in South Sudan while simultaneously emphasizing the importance of protecting women and children.

==== Myanmar (2012–) ====
In 2012, Nonviolent Peaceforce received an official invitation from the Government of Myanmar. One of the main tasks NP has there is to monitor ceasefires and to set up mechanisms by which civilians can monitor them. They hold trainings across the country for these purposes. NP is also supporting women's organizations on the ground, aiding them in taking a more prominent role in guiding decision-making at the local level.

==== Iraq (2017–) ====
Nonviolent Peaceforce began work in Iraq in February 2017, establishing an office in Erbil, in the Kurdistan Region of Iraq (KRI) and deploying staff to facilitate the start-up of a country programme. NP initially focused on the provision of frontline protection services to internally displaced persons (IDP) along the displacement corridors during the military offensives to retake ISIS-controlled areas. Since the end of major combat operations against ISIS, NP has refocused efforts on vulnerable IDPs in camps, returnees in contested and high-risk areas, tensions along the disputed Federal Iraq and KRI border, and arbitrary detentions.

==== Thailand (2015–) ====
NP's work in Thailand began in 2015, when NP teamed up with Rotary Clubs of St. Paul, Minnesota, U.S. and Khuanlang-Hatyai, Thailand for three workshops on civilian engagement in peace processes. From 2016 to the present, most of NP's work has been in Southern Thailand—in Patani, Yala and Narathiwat Provinces—through collaboration with local partners. NP hosts training and lecture series on UCP and intercultural competencies geared towards the civil society organizations, women's groups, university students, and the broader community. Additionally, NP supports research initiatives; NP Philippines has facilitated small grant research on UCP opportunities and developing civilian protection guidelines. NP promotes WPS and connecting women civil society organizations in Southern Thailand with the broader southeast Asia community. For example, NP hosted a learning exchange between women civil society organizations in Myanmar, Mindanao (Philippines), Pattani (Thailand) and a university network in Indonesia.

==== United States (2020–) ====
In cities around the country, protesters and civilians have come together to de-escalate force by federal agents and armed groups, protect neighborhoods and local businesses, call for accountability in municipal budgeting and policing, and re-envision community safety. Yet, communities often grapple with what it means to maintain their commitments to less reliance on law enforcement response to safety concerns that can be resolved without use of force or threat of force.

In this context, NP will continue to explore collaborations with community partners to open dialogue, maintain space for civic engagement and protest, as well as equip students, community members, and safety professionals alike with actionable frameworks and skills in both violence prevention and nonviolent resolution of conflict.

The 2021 Somali Independence Day celebration in the Seward neighborhood of Minneapolis, MN had security and traffic control overseen by Nonviolent Peaceforce staff instead of armed local police.

==== Sudan (2021–) ====
In NP's country program, it will deepen the implementation of Unarmed Civilian Protection (UCP) in Darfuri communities. The first team NP there has been training and coaching local leaders in peacebuilding and civilian protection. NP is also building relationships with conflict-affected communities to identify needs and priorities for the work. The team is conducting orientation workshops about UCP for women, youth or marginalized communities that explore how UCP can strengthen existing community self-protection efforts. NP's goal is to enhance safety and security of high-risk communities in Darfur by supporting and strengthening local peace initiatives such as locally brokered peace agreements, serving as an intermediary between groups in a dispute, and supporting communities to actively engage in regional and national peace processes.

==== Ukraine (2022–) ====
NP works in frontline areas in south and north of Ukraine, providing unarmed protection to civilians, including local volunteer collectives. To date, NP Ukraine has provided protection in highly insecure territories where international presence is limited or non-existent, advocating for protection needs in underserved and frontline communities, and supporting the local population through providing personal protective equipment (like protective vests), fuel, and volunteer stipends.

== Awards ==
Together with its founder Mel Duncan, the organization in 2007 received the International Pfeffer Peace Award from the Fellowship of Reconciliation. The Luxembourg Peace Prize was awarded to the organization in 2018.

== See also ==
- List of anti-war organizations
- Peacebuilding
- Third Party Non-violent Intervention
- Civilian-based defense
- List of non-UN peacekeeping missions
