= Singapore (disambiguation) =

Singapore is an island city-state in Southeast Asia.

Singapore, Singapur, Singapura, Sin-ka-pho, Sim-gia-bo, Xinjiapo, Singhapura, Singhpur, Singhpura, Singpur, Sinhapura and Simhapura (all from Sanskrit सिंहपुर (IAST: Siṃhapura)) may also refer to:

== Places ==
=== Singapore ===
- City of Singapore (historical entity), a former city in the central part of the Singapore island
- Colony of Singapore, a colony of the British Empire on the island of Singapore which received internal self-governance in the 1950s by the State of Singapore Act and joined Malaysia for a short time as a state before gaining independence from it in the 1960s
- Kingdom of Singapura, a 14th-century Malay kingdom centered in modern-day Singapore
- Pulau Ujong or Singapore Island, the mainland island of Singapore

=== India ===
- Singapur, Adilabad district, a census town in Adilabad district, Andhra Pradesh, India
- Singpur, a settlement in Gujarat, India
- Singhpora-Pattan, a town in Jammu and Kashmir, India
- Singapura, a settlement in Raichur district, Karnataka, India
- Singapur, in Mancherial district in Telangana, India
- Singpur, a settlement in Madhya Pradesh, India
- Singpur, a settlement in Maharashtra, India
- Singpur, a settlement in Orissa, India
- Singhpur, Rajasthan, a village in Rajasthan, India
- Singapura, a settlement in Rajasthan, India
- Singhpur, Raebareli, a village in Uttar Pradesh, India
- Singhpur, Punjab, a village in Jalandhar district of Punjab, India
- Singhpuria Misl, one of the original Sikh Misls in Punjab
- Singhpur railway station, railway station on Bilaspur–Katni line under Bilaspur railway division of South East Central Railway Zone of Indian Railways

=== Other places ===
- Singpur, a settlement in Barisal Division, Bangladesh
- Singaparna, a settlement in West Java, Indonesia
- Singhpura, Pakistan, a town in Punjab, Pakistan
- Singapore (South Africa), a settlement in Limpopo province, South Africa
- Singapore, Michigan, a ghost town in the United States
- Sinhapura, a legendary city located in India, Malaysia or Thailand, mentioned in Sinhalese Buddhist texts
- Singapore Island, one of the many artificial islands making up The World archipelago in the United Arab Emirates

== Film ==
- Singapore (1947 film), an American film starring Ava Gardner
- Singapore (1960 film), a Bollywood film starring Shammi Kapoor
- Singaporenalli Raja Kulla, a Kannada film starring Vishnuvardhan and Dwarakish

== Music ==
- Singapur (album), by Terminaator, 1998
- "Singapore" (song), by 2 Plus 1, 1980
- "Singapore", a song by Tom Waits from Rain Dogs
- "Singapore", a song by Girls Aloud from The Sound of Girls Aloud: The Greatest Hits
- "Singapore", a song by OneRepublic from Artificial Paradise

== Other uses ==
- Singapore Airlines, the national airline of Singapore, based at Singapore’s Changi Airport
- Singapura cat, a breed of cat
- Singapore Sling, a gin sling drink
- Singapore (horse), a Thoroughbred racehorse
- Sincapore, one of several vessels using a 19th century variant of the name

== See also ==
- Central Area, Singapore, an area in the Central Region of Singapore (also called the "City Area" or informally "the City")
- "On a Little Street in Singapore", a jazz song written by Billy Hill and Peter DeRose
- Road to Singapore (1940), an American film
- Short Singapore, a series of British military flying boats
- Virtual Singapore, a 3D digital replica of Singapore
- Singaporean (disambiguation)
- Simhapuri (disambiguation)
- Sing Buri (disambiguation)
- Simhapura, capital of the legendary Indian king Simhabahu
- Leopolis (disambiguation), also means "lion city"
- Singaporean language
- Sihor, a city with the same etymology
- Spore (disambiguation)
