= Gurholi =

Village in Maharashtra

- village
- Location in Maharashtra, India
- Coordinates: 18°24′19″N 74°5′39″E
- Country: India
- State: Maharashtra
- District: Pune

Population
  - Total: 2,500
- Demonym: Gurolikar

Languages
  - Official: Marathi
- Time zone: UTC+5:30 (IST)
- PIN: 412104
- Telephone code: 02115, 912115
- Vehicle registration: MH 12
- Nearest city: Pune, Saswad
- Literacy: approx. 80%
- Lok Sabha constituency: Baramati
- Vidhan Sabha constituency: Purandar

Gurholi is a village in Purandar Taluka, India, with an agrarian economy, where fruits such as figs, custard apples, and pomegranates are produced. The village is surrounded by three mountains, and has temples among the mountains.

Gurholi is 21 kilometers from Jejuri, 18 kilometers from Saswad, and 16 kilometers from Uruli Kanchan.

== Geography ==
Gurholi is located at 18°24′19″N 74°5′39″E. It has an average elevation of 700 metres (2303 feet). It is bordered by Walti and Alandi mhatobachi town on the north, Sonawari town on the west Vanpuri and Pargaon towns on the south, Waghapur and Singapur town on the west. It is situated at a distance of 160 km from the Maharashtra State Capital of Mumbai by road. Gurholi is at a distance of 30 km from District main City Pune and 70 km from Baramati. Gurholi is at a distance of 18 km from Taluka main city Saswad and 10 km from Jejuri and 16 from Uruli Kanchan. Gurholi is situated on Deccan plateau.

It has good connectivity with nearby cities like Saswad, Uruli and Jejuri. It is the village which lies in the Middle region of the Pune district of Maharashtra state. It is 3 km from State highway no SH-61. The local language spoken in Guroli is Marathi.

Guroli has divided into the following residential areas:

- Guroli Gavthan
- PanhalWadi
- Indiranagar
- Patil Wasti
- Maske Wasti
- Shivnagar
- Kharade Wasti
- Vikas Wadi
- Lalwadi
- Jadhav Wadi
- Rajebacha Mala

== Transport ==
Buses run from Saswad S.T. stand to Gurholi. Buses running on routes from Saswad are Yawat, Uruli Kanchan, Darekar (Tamhanwadi) wadi and from Uruli to Saswad). There is much service on the Saswad - Urulikanchan Road. There is a ST bus from Gurholi to Swargate. Although these services have been temporarily suspended.

== Educational facility ==
- Jilha Parihsad Prathmik school.(standard 1 to 4)
- New English School Gurholi.(Standard 5 to 10).

Both schools are under Pune University and Maharashtra Board.

== Climate ==
Climate data for Gurholi
Month	Jan	Feb	Mar	Apr	May	Jun	Jul	Aug	Sep	Oct	Nov	Dec	Year
Mean daily maximum °C (°F)	30.0 (86.0)	34.0 (93.2)	37.0 (98.6)	39.0 (102.2)	40.0 (104.0)	35.0 (95.0)	30.0 (86.0)	27.0 (80.6)	30.0 (86.0)	28.0 (82.4)	27.0 (80.6)	26.0 (78.8)	33.0 (91.4)
Mean daily minimum °C (°F)	22.0 (71.6)	23.0 (73.4)	24.0 (75.2)	26.0 (78.8)	26.0 (78.8)	23.0 (73.4)	22.0 (71.6)	21.0 (69.8)	21.0 (69.8)	20.0 (68.0)	20.0 (68.0)	20.5 (68.9)	21.0 (69.8)
Average precipitation mm (inches)	00 (0)	00 (0)	00 (0)	00 (0)	00 (0)	00 (0)	00 (0)	00 (0)	00 (0)	00 (0)	00 (0)	00 (0)	00 (0)
Average precipitation days	00	00	00	00	00	00	00	00	00	00	00	00	0
Mean monthly sunshine hours	00	00	00	00	00	00	00	00	00	00	00	00	00

Gurholi has a dry climate. The city experiences three distinct seasons: summer, monsoon and winter. Typical summer months are from February to May, with maximum temperatures ranging from 30 to 40 °C (86 to 104 °F). The warmest months in Gurholi are May. The monsoon lasts from June to end of September, with moderate rainfall. Winter months are October to January.

== Demography ==
Religions in Gurholi
Religion	Percent
Hindu	90.0%
Buddhist	08.0%
Muslim	02.0%

Gurholi is a medium size village located in Purandhar of Pune district, Maharashtra with total 426 families residing. The Gurholi village has population of 1941 of which 968 are males while 973 are females as per Population Census 2011.

In Gurholi village population of children with age 0-6 is 189 which makes up 9.74% of total population of village. Average Sex Ratio of Gurholi village is 1005 which is higher than Maharashtra state average of 929. The Child Sex Ratio for the Gurholi as per census is 817, lower than the Maharashtra average of 894.

Gurholi village has lower literacy rate compared to Maharashtra. In 2011, literacy rate of Gurholi village was 79.28% compared to 82.34% of Maharashtra. In Gurholi Male literacy stands at 87.96% while female literacy rate was 70.83%.
