= Spore (disambiguation) =

A spore is an asexual biological reproductive mechanism.

Spore may also refer to:

== Video games ==
- Spore (1987 video game), a game for the Commodore 64 and ZX Spectrum
- Spore (1991 video game), a video game for MS-DOS
- Spore (2008 video game), a video game by Maxis

== Music ==
- The Spore, a 2005 album by Opiate for the Masses
- Spore (band), an American rock band
- "Spore", a 2015 song by Scottish musician Momus from his album Turpsycore

== Publication ==
- Spore (agricultural publication), a magazine published by CTA

== Technology ==
- Security Protocols Open Repository

== Other uses ==
- S'pore, common popular abbreviation for Singapore
- Spore (Phrygia), a town of ancient Phrygia, now in Turkey
- Spore, West Pomeranian Voivodeship, a village in Poland
- Galaxy of Fear: Spore, a book by John Whitman

== See also ==
- Diaspore (botany), a plant disseminule
- Endospore, a hardy bacterial non-reproductive survival structure
- Spore-like cells, a specific class of stem cells
- Spore print, a diagnostic character for identifying mushrooms
- Resting spore, created by fungi
- Milky spore, a bacterium of the white grubs of Japanese beetles
- Bacterial morphological plasticity, bacteria changing into spores
- Singapore (disambiguation)
