= List of shipwrecks in May 1824 =

The list of shipwrecks in May 1824 includes some ships sunk, foundered, grounded, or otherwise lost during May 1824.

== 1 May ==
List of shipwrecks: 1 May 1824
Ship	State	Description
Alpha	United Kingdom	The sealer was wrecked on Flat Rock, Torbay, Newfoundland, British North America. Her crew were rescued.
Francis	United Kingdom	The ship was driven ashore and wrecked at La Orotava, Tenerife, Canary Islands. Her crew were rescued.
Henry	United Kingdom	The ship was abandoned in the Atlantic Ocean. Her crew were rescued by Dædalus (United Kingdom). Henry was on a voyage from Portsmouth, Hampshire to Quebec City, Lower Canada, British North America.
Mantura	United Kingdom	The ship ran aground on the Black Middings, in the North Sea off the coast of County Durham and was severely damaged. She was refloated and taken in to North Shields for repairs.
Policy	United Kingdom	The whaler was lost on Otaheite.
Prince William	United Kingdom	The brig foundered in the Atlantic Ocean. Her crew were rescued by Venus (United Kingdom).

== 3 May ==
List of shipwrecks: 3 May 1824
Ship	State	Description
Joseph & Mary	United Kingdom	The ship collided with Neptune (United Kingdom) and sank in the English Channel off Dungeness, Kent with the loss of two of her crew. Survivors were rescued by Neptune. Joseph & Mary was on a voyage from Jersey, Channel Islands to Milton Regis, Kent.
Sincapore	United Kingdom	The ship was driven ashore and wrecked in Algoa Bay.
Snow Drop	United Kingdom	The Humber Keel was reported to have foundered in the North Sea off Skegness, Lincolnshire with the loss of all on board. She was on a voyage from Hull, Yorkshire to Great Yarmouth, Norfolk. Snow Drop was taken in to Great Yarmouth on 5 May in a waterlogged condition.
Two Brothers	United Kingdom	The ship was wrecked on the Corton Sand, in the North Sea off the coast of Suffolk. Her crew were rescued.

== 4 May ==
List of shipwrecks: 4 May 1824
Ship	State	Description
Harriet	United Kingdom	The ship was abandoned in the Atlantic Ocean. All on board were rescued by Canada and Elizabeth (both United Kingdom). Harriet was on a voyage from Liverpool, Lancashire to Miramichi, New Brunswick, British North America.

== 5 May ==
List of shipwrecks: 5 May 1824
Ship	State	Description
Hope	United Kingdom	The ship was abandoned in the Atlantic Ocean. Her ten crew were rescued by Ranger and William (both United Kingdom). She was on a voyage from Teignmouth, Devon to Newfoundland, British North America.
Nelly	United Kingdom	The ship was wrecked on the Beeves Rocks in the River Shannon. She was on a voyage from Glasgow, Renfrewshire to County Clare.

== 6 May ==
List of shipwrecks: 6 May 1824
Ship	State	Description
Experiment	United Kingdom	The ship was abandoned in the Atlantic Ocean off the coast of Newfoundland, British North America. Her crew were rescued by Lascar (United Kingdom). Her crew were rescued.
Jessy & Charlotte	United Kingdom	The ship was wrecked on Saaremaa, Russia. Her crew were rescued. She was on a voyage from Newcastle upon Tyne, Northumberland to Saint Petersburg, Russia.
Providence	United Kingdom	The sloop foundered in the North Sea off North Somercotes, Lincolnshire. Her crew were rescued. She was on a voyage from Newcastle upon Tyne, Northumberland to York.
Sector	United Kingdom	The ship was wrecked on the Anegada Shoals, Virgin Islands. Her crew were rescued. She was on a voyage from Trinidad to Saint Thomas, Virgin Islands.

== 7 May ==
List of shipwrecks: 7 May 1824
Ship	State	Description
Aimable Eulalie	France	The ship was wrecked on the Anegada Shoals, Virgin Islands. She was on a voyage from Guadeloupe to Havre de Grâce, Seine-Inférieure.

== 8 May ==
List of shipwrecks: 8 May 1824
Ship	State	Description
Berkeley Castle	United Kingdom	The ship was lost near Milford Haven, Pembrokeshire. Her crew were rescued. She was on a voyage from Bangor, Caernarfonshire to Berkeley, Gloucestershire.
Lion	France	The ship was wrecked near Algiers, Algeria. She was on a voyage from Marseille, Bouches-du-Rhône to Havre de Grâce, Seine-Inférieure.
Matthew and Thomas	United Kingdom	The ship foundered in the Atlantic Ocean. William Dawson(United Kingdom) rescued all aboard.
Susannah	United Kingdom	The ship foundered in the Irish Sea off Strumble Head, Pembrokeshire. Her crew were rescued. She was on a voyage from Swansea, Glamorgan to Liverpool, Lancashire.

== 9 May ==
List of shipwrecks: 9 May 1824
Ship	State	Description
Cacique	France	The ship was lost on this date. Her crew were rescued. She was on a voyage from Bordeaux, Gironde to Veracruz, Mexico.
Dowson	United Kingdom	The ship was lost in the Saint Lawrence River. British Queen rescued the crew.
Pactolus	United States	The ship was driven ashore at Cádiz, Spain. She was later refloated.

== 10 May ==
List of shipwrecks: 10 May 1824
Ship	State	Description
Margery	United Kingdom	The ship foundered in the Atlantic Ocean. Her crew were rescued by Fancy (United Kingdom. She was on a voyage from London to Montreal, Lower Canada, British North America.

== 15 May ==
List of shipwrecks: 15 May 1824
Ship	State	Description
Liberality	United Kingdom	The brig was abandoned in the Atlantic Ocean. Her crew were rescued by Charlotte (United Kingdom).
Pilgrim	United Kingdom	The ship departed from Campeche, Mexico for Bristol, Gloucestershire. Initially, there was no further trace; she was presumed to have foundered in the Atlantic Ocean with the loss of all hands. However, the ship had been captured by pirates. (See Shannon, below.)
Shannon	United Kingdom	The ship departed from Campeche for Cork. Initially, there was no further trace; she was presumed to have foundered in the Atlantic Ocean with the loss of all hands. Casson ( Pirates) off Campeche, Mexico. The pirates murdered the crew and set Shannon on fire in the Laguna de Términos, destroying her. On 24 June HMS Parthian captured a pirate schooner with clothing and documents belonging to Pilgrim and Shannon.
Unity	United Kingdom	The sloop was driven ashore and wrecked between Overstrand and Sidestrand, Norfolk. Her five crew were rescued.

== 22 May ==
List of shipwrecks: 22 May 1824
Ship	State	Description
Colombian	United States	The ship was lost in the Gaspar Strait. Her crew were rescued. She was on a voyage from China to Philadelphia, Pennsylvania.

== 23 May ==
List of shipwrecks: 23 May 1824
Ship	State	Description
Cynthia	United Kingdom	The ship was driven ashore at "Candias", Brazil.
Eleanor	(United Kingdom of Great Britain and Ireland) Bahamas	The schooner was wrecked on the Brothers Keys, 12 nautical miles (22 km) off Ragged Island, Bahamas with the loss of seventeen of the 22 people on board. She was in a voyage from Nuevitas, Cuba to Baracoa, Cuba.
St. Bruno	France	The ship was wrecked on the west coast of Faial Island, Azores, Portugal. She was on a voyage from Senegal to Havre de Grâce, Seine-Inférieure.

== 24 May ==
List of shipwrecks: 24 May 1824
Ship	State	Description
Fanny	United Kingdom	The ship ran aground at Tortola and was severely damaged. She was on a voyage from Lisbon, Portugal to Maranhão, Brazil.

== 26 May ==
List of shipwrecks: 26 May 1824
Ship	State	Description
Briton	United Kingdom	The ship was driven ashore at Riga, Russia. Her crew were rescued. She was later refloated.
General Kempt	United Kingdom	The ship was wrecked on Grand Manan with the loss of a crew member. She was on a voyage from Liverpool, Lancashire to Saint John, New Brunswick, British North America.
Margaret	United Kingdom	The ship was driven ashore at Messina, Sicily. She was on a voyage from Livorno, Grand Duchy of Tuscany to London.

== 29 May ==
List of shipwrecks: 29 May 1824
Ship	State	Description
Intrepid	United Kingdom	The ship was wrecked at Antigua. She was on a voyage from Liverpool, Lancashire to Saint-Domingue.

== Unknown date ==
List of shipwrecks: Unknown date in May 1824
Ship	State	Description
Bellona	United Kingdom	The ship was driven ashore and severely damaged at Bideford, Devon in early May. She was on a voyage from Bideford to Prince Edward Island, British North America. Bellond was taken in to Bideford for repairs.
Caledonia	United States	The brig was driven ashore and wrecked in the Los Roques archipelago, Gran Colombia before 15 April. She was on a voyage from Philadelphia, Pennsylvania to La Guayra, Gran Colombia.
Ceres	United Kingdom	The ship was driven ashore on the coast of British North America. She was later refloated and taken in to Quebec City, Lower Canada.
Crown	United Kingdom	The ship was driven ashore on Hare Island, Lower Canada, British North America before 17 May.
Cumberland	United Kingdom	The ship was abandoned in the Atlantic Ocean on or before 11 May. She was on a voyage from Liverpool, Lancashire to Quebec City, Lower Canada, British North America.
Cynthia	United Kingdom	The ship was driven ashore at Cape St. Augustine, Brazil.
Duncomber	United Kingdom	The ship was wrecked on Scaterie Island, Nova Scotia, British North America before 2 June. Her crew were rescued.
El Carmen	Pirates	The schooner was captured and burnt by HMS Hussar (Royal Navy) before 29 May.
Endeavour	United Kingdom	The ship was driven ashore on the coast of British North America. She was later refloated and taken in to Quebec City.
Ewretta	United Kingdom	The ship was abandoned in the Atlantic Ocean. Her crew were rescued by Franklin (United Kingdom.
Friends	United Kingdom	The ship was driven ashore on Green Island, British North America. She was later refloated and taken in to Quebec City.
Gilbert	United Kingdom	The ship was lost on the coast of Nova Scotia, British North America. Her crew were rescued.
Hannah	United Kingdom	The ship was lost in the Saint Lawrence River. Her crew were rescued.
Governor	United Kingdom	The ship ran aground on the White Island Shoal, off the coast of British North America.
Harriet	United Kingdom	The ship was lost on a voyage from New Orleans, Louisiana, United States to Tampico Mexico.
Hit or Miss	(United Kingdom of Great Britain and Ireland) British North America	The schooner was wrecked at St. Peter's, Nova Scotia. She was on a voyage from Quebec City, Lower Canada to Conception Bay.
Hope	United Kingdom	The brig was abandoned in the Atlantic Ocean. Her eight crew were rescued by William (United Kingdom).
Hope	United Kingdom	The ship was driven ashore at Wigton, Cumberland before 7 May and was abandoned by her crew. She was on a voyage from Liverpool, Lancashire to Newfoundland, British North America. Hope was later refloated
Hope	United Kingdom	The sealer was sunk by ice off the coast of Newfoundland.
Houston	United Kingdom	The ship was abandoned in the Atlantic Ocean.
Icarus and Speedwell	Pirates	The felucca was captured and burnt by HMS Hussar (Royal Navy) before 29 May.
James Murdock	United States	The ship was driven ashore near "Ramegat". She was on a voyage from Cuba to an American port.
Resolution	United Kingdom	The ship was lost in the Saint Lawrence River. Her crew survived.
Venus	United Kingdom	The ship was driven ashore on the coast of British North America. She was later refloated and taken in to Quebec City.
