= Rahibai Soma Popere =

Indian farmer and conservationist (born 1964)

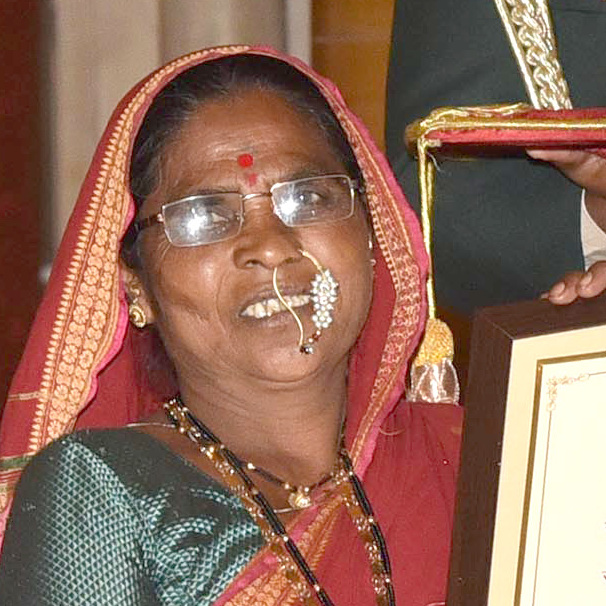
- in 2019
- Born: 1964 (age 61–62); Ahmednagar district
- Other name: Seed Mother
- Education: None
- Occupations: Farmer, agriculturist, conservationist
- Known for: Conservation of indigenous plant varieties
- Awards: BBC 100 Women, 2018; Nari Shakti Puraskar, 2019; Padma Shri (2020)

Rahibai Soma Popere (pronounced [raːhiːbaːiː somaː popɛrɛ]), born in 1964, is an Indian farmer and conservationist. She helps other farmers return to native varieties of crops, preparing hyacinth beans for self-help groups. She is among three Indians on the BBC list of "100 Women 2018". Scientist Raghunath Mashelkar gave her the epithet "Seed Mother".

== Early life ==
Popere is from Kombhalne village located in Akole block of Ahmednagar district in the state of Maharashtra. She has no formal education. She has worked on farms all her life and has an extraordinary understanding of crop diversity. she belong to Mahadev Koli community of Maharashtra.

== Career ==
Rahibai Soma Popere farm land, where she grows 17 different crops. She was visited by the BAIF Development Research Foundation in 2017, who found the gardens she supported had enough produce to meet the dietary requirements of a family for a whole year.

She developed a series of hyacinth beans for self-help groups and families in nearby villages. She was described by Raghunath Mashelkar, the erstwhile Director General of the Council of Scientific and Industrial Research as 'Seed Mother'. She is an active member of the self-help group Kalsubai parisar Biyanse Sarvdhan centre (translation: Committee for seed conservation in the Kalsubai region). She has created her own methods to harvest water on farms; turning wasteland into space she can use productively. She trains farmers and students on ways to select seeds, keep fertile soils and manage pests. She is skilled in four-step paddy cultivation. She has learned to rear poultry in her yard with the support of the Maharashtra Institute of Technology Transfer for Rural Areas (MITTRA).

=== Awards ===
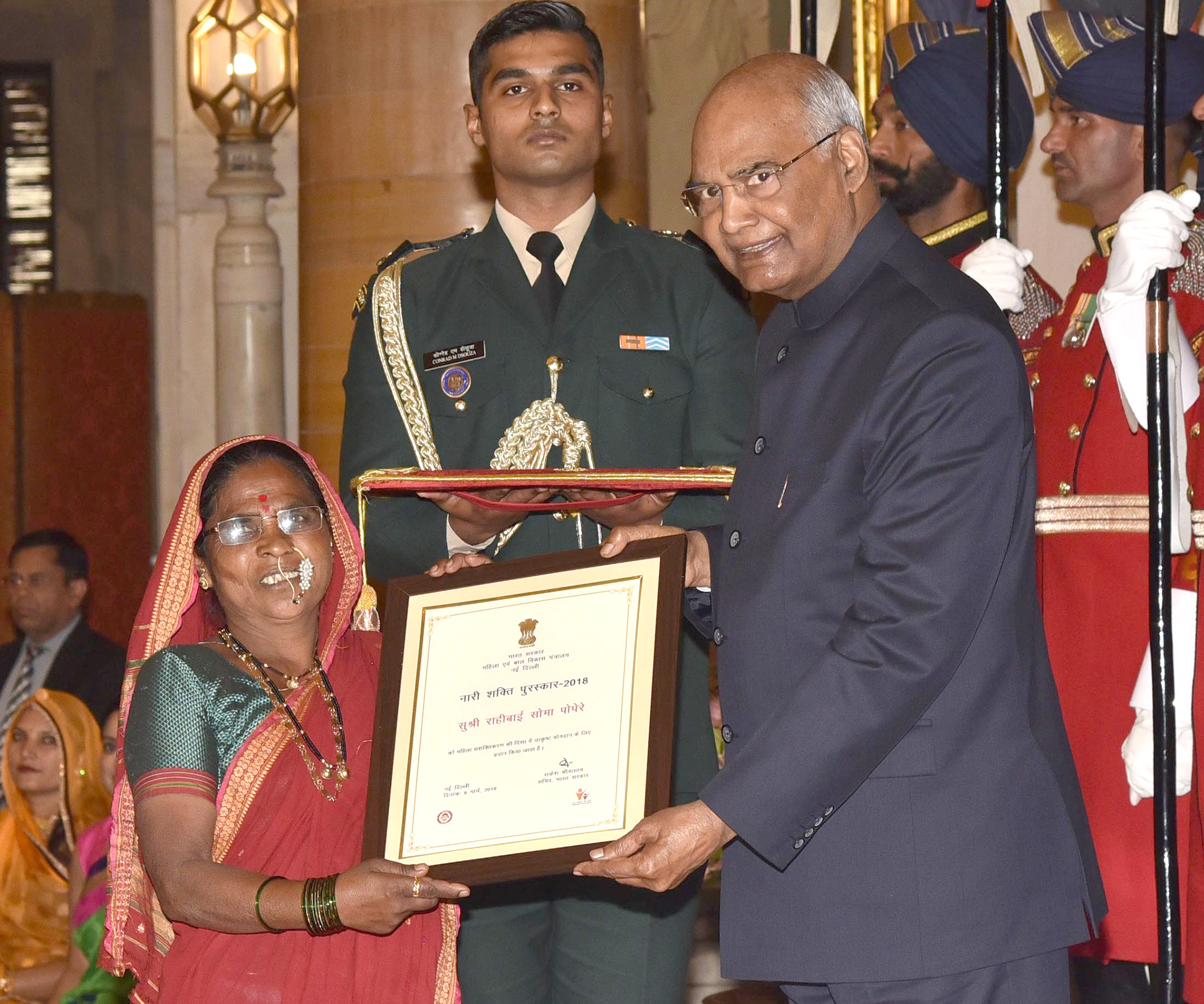
Ram Nath Kovind presenting the Nari Shakti Puraskar to her in 2018

- BBC 100 Women 2018
- The Best Seed Saver award
- BAIF Development Research Foundation Best Farmer Award
- Nari Shakti Puraskar, 2018, instituted by the Ministry of Women and Child Development, Government of India.
- Padma Shri, 2020

Ram Nath Kovind presenting Padma Shri to Rahibai Popere Additionally, in January 2015, she received appreciation from Prem Mathur, Honorary Research Fellow at Bioversity International and from R. R. Hanchinal, chairperson of a government body for the protection of plant varieties and farmers' rights in India.
