= Larry Rosenberg =

American Buddhist teacher (born 1932)

Larry Rosenberg (born December 15, 1932) is an American Buddhist teacher who founded the Cambridge Insight Meditation Center in Cambridge, Massachusetts, in 1985. He is also a resident teacher there. Rosenberg was a professor of psychology at the University of Chicago and Harvard Medical School. In addition to teaching at the Insight Meditation Center in Cambridge, he is also a senior teacher at the Insight Meditation Society in Barre, Massachusetts.

Rosenberg was born to Russian-Jewish immigrants and grew up in Coney Island in a working-class family. His father, who had Marxist leanings, came from 14 generations of rabbis.

Rosenberg got his BS at Brooklyn College and his Ph.D. in social psychology from the University of Chicago, where he also subsequently taught. He later became an assistant professor in the Department of Psychiatry at Harvard. Disappointed with his experience in academia, he turned to intensive Buddhist practice. A major turning point that influenced this decision was his introduction to the teachings of Jiddu Krishnamurti and Vimala Thakar. He received Zen training with Korean Master Seung Sahn and Japanese Master Katagiri Roshi for eight years before coming to Vipassana. Anagarika Munindra was his first Vipassana teacher.

His book Breath by Breath is a clear description of the practice of anapanasati (mindful breath meditation). His emphasis on the breath as an object of meditation was, in part, inspired by his encounter with the Thai meditation teacher Buddhadasa. Anapanasati and also forms the basis of his teachings at the Cambridge Insight Meditation Center.

== Books ==
- L. Rosenberg with David Guy, Breath by Breath: The Liberating Practice of Insight Meditation, Shambhala Publications, 2004. ISBN 1-59030-136-6.
- L. Rosenberg and D. Guy, Living In the Light of Death: On the Art of Being Truly Alive, Shambhala Publications, 2001. ISBN 1-57062-820-3
- L. Rosenberg with Laura Zimmerman, Three Steps to Awakening: A Practice for Bringing Mindfulness to Life, Shambhala Publications, 2013. ISBN 1-59030-516-7
- L. Rosenberg with Madeline Drexler, The World Exists to Set Us Free: Straight-up Dharma for Living a Life of Awareness, Boulder, Colorado: Shambhala, 2025. ISBN 978-1-64547-394-7
