= Simhapuri (disambiguation) =

Simhapuri is another name of Nellore, a city in Andhra Pradesh, India.

Simhapuri may also refer to:

- Simhapuri Express, an express train run by Indian Railways between Nellore and Secunderabad
- Vikrama Simhapuri University, a university in Nellore, India
- Simhapuri Simham, a 1983 Indian Telugu-language film starring Chiranjeevi

== See also ==
- Singapore (disambiguation)
- Simhapura, capital of the legendary Indian king Simhabahu
