= Leopolis =

Leopolis (from Greek roots meaning lion city) may refer to:

- The Latin name for Lviv, Ukraine
  - Leopolis Jazz Fest, held in Lviv
- Leopolis, Missouri, USA; a ghost town
- Leopolis, Wisconsin, USA; an unincorporated community
- Leópolis, Paraná, Brazil; a municipality
- Leópolis, the Portuguese and Spanish name of Lviv

== See also ==
- Siṃhapura, the Sanskrit origin of Singapore, also means lion city
- Shicheng, a Chinese underwater city. Its name means lion city
