= Singaporean (disambiguation) =

Singaporeans (singular: Singaporean) are the citizens and nationals of the sovereign island city-state of Singapore.

Singaporean may also refer to:

- Demographics of Singapore
- Culture of Singapore
- Singaporean cuisine
- Singapore (as an adjective)

== See also ==
- Singapore (disambiguation)
