= Talks on the Gita =

Book authored by Vinobha Bhave

Talks on the Gita is the book authored by Vinoba Bhave during his stay in jail in 1932.

== History ==
Talks on the Gita was delivered by Vinoba Bhave in 1932 during his stay in jail. The book summarises different chapters of Srimad Bhagwad Gita in simple terms. The book was also translated into Indian and foreign languages.
