= Sing Buri (disambiguation) =

Sing Buri (or Singburi) may refer to these places in Thailand:

- the town Sing Buri
- Sing Buri Province
- Sing Buri district

== See also ==
- Singapore (disambiguation)
