= Spore (Phrygia) =

Town in ancient Phrygia

Coordinates: 39°14′35″N 29°52′09″E

Spore was a town of ancient Phrygia, inhabited in Roman and Byzantine times.

Its site is tentatively located near Pınarbaşı in Asiatic Turkey.
