= Manibhai Desai =

Indian social activist

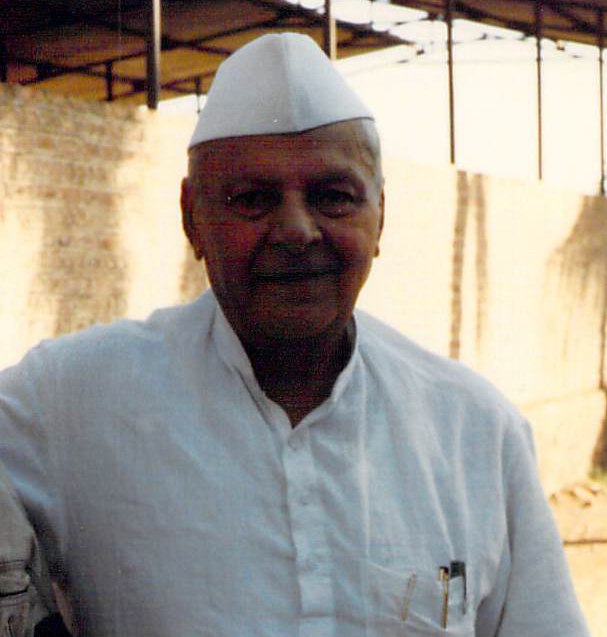
- Desai in 1990 at Uruli Kanchan
- Born: 27 April 1920; Kosmada, Surat District, Bombay presidency (now in State of Gujarat)
- Died: 14 November 1993 (aged 73); Pune, India
- Occupation: Social activist
- Awards: Padma Shri; Ramon Magsaysay Award

Manibhai Bhimbhai Desai (27 April 1920 – 14 November 1993) was an Indian social activist, associate of Mahatma Gandhi, and a pioneer of rural development.

== Early life ==
Manibhai Desai was born to Ramiben and Bhimbhai Desai, on April 27, 1920, in the village of Kosmada, Surat District, Bombay presidency (now in State of Gujarat), British India. His father, Bhimbhai, was a well-to-do farmer and respected leader among the farmers of the 10 or 15 villages in the area. The couple had five boys and one daughter. When Bhimbhai died in 1927, the eldest son took charge of the ancestral farm while the next two sons pursued careers in the textile industry, one becoming a gold medal spinner and the other an expert weaver and the general manager of one of India's largest textile units. At the time of his father's death Manibhai was in first grade at the elementary school in his native village. For the five years he attended that school (1927-1931) he ranked first in his class; he was also good in sports and a leader in the Boy Scouts. India in these years was being shaken by Mahatma Gandhi's civil disobedience against British rule. Desai credited an incident that happened when he was ten that influenced his future life. A young man from the village, Narottambhai Patel, joined Gandhi on his 1930 Salt March from Ahmadabad to Dandi where the demonstrators raided the salt stocks as a protest against the imposition of a salt tax. It was Patel's duty on his return to the village, to see that a pinch of salt, which had become a symbol of the struggle for independence, was distributed to each household. He chose young Manibhai to carry out the task. Deeply moved by the sight of villagers bowing down as they ate the salt, Manibhai felt at age 10 the call of Mahatma Gandhi. Later Manibhai attended high school in Surat. Since his family wanted him to pursue a career in Engineering, young Manibhai selected Physics and Mathematics for his undergraduate studies. However, in his final year of Manibhai's study, Gandhi started the Quit India movement against the British rule that Manibhai joined and was even imprisoned by the British.

== Career ==
After graduation Manibhai joined Mahatma Gandhi in the independence struggle. Mahatma Gandhi stayed in the village of Uruli Kanchan near the city of Pune in 1946. At that time Gandhi had lost trust in western medicine and wanted to explore Nature therapy. For this purpose he nominated Manibhai as the manager of the newly established Nature therapy Ashram at Urali. The young Manibhai gave a pledge to Mahatma Gandhi to devote his life to uplifting of Uruli. His first major activity there was to manage the Nature cure Ashram which continues to this day and is well known throughout India. The Nature cure therapy at the ashram followed guidelines issued by Gandhiji. They included regulation of diet, fast, sun-bath, fomentations, steam-bath, mud- bandage, massage and non-injurious indigenous herbs. Manibhai followed this by opening a high school in Uruli. Although Gandhian principles were central to Manibhai's work, he believed the rural poor can benefit from scientific advances During his work at the Nature cure ashram, Manibhai self-taught himself aspects of horticulture and cattle breeding. To take this to next stage, he founded the NGO Bharatiya Agro-Industries Foundation (BAIF) in 1967. BAIF has been a pioneer in cross breeding of high yielding European cattle such as Holstein Freisian and Jersey with the sturdy Indian breeds such as Gir from Gujarat. During this period Manibhai visited numerous countries around the world such as Denmark, Great Britain, United States, Canada and Israel to learn about cattle breeding, farming techniques and to raise funds. Indian politicians at the highest level used to visit Urali to see for themselves the cow breeding activities. Later Manibhai expanded the scope of activities for BAIF to include animal health, nutrition, afforestation wasteland development, and tribal development.

Although Manibhai did not pursue high political office, he served as the Sarpanch Council chjief) of Uruli Kanchan Gram panchayat (village council) for many years. He also served on the board of Yeshwant sahakari sakhar karkhana (Yeshwant cooperative sugar mill) at nearby village of Theur for many years.

== Awards and honours ==
In 1968, the Indian government honoured Manibhai with the Padmashree award. In 1982, Manibhai accepted the Ramon Magsaysay Award for Public Service. In 1983, he received the Jamnalal Bajaj Award for Gandhian values, community values and social development.

== Death and legacy ==
Manibhai died on 14 November 1993 at Pune. The institutes he established have continued and prospered.

- BAIF with Canadian funding set up a new headquarters and a management training center in 1996 at Warje in the outskirts of Pune. The center has been named Dr. Manibhai Desai Nagar.

"ManiBhai is a revered figure for people in Village of Dulba, District Patiala, Punjab.His birthday every year is marked by celebrations and by paying respect and thanking him for his work in rural areas.
