= Uruli =

Bowl, traditional cookware used South India

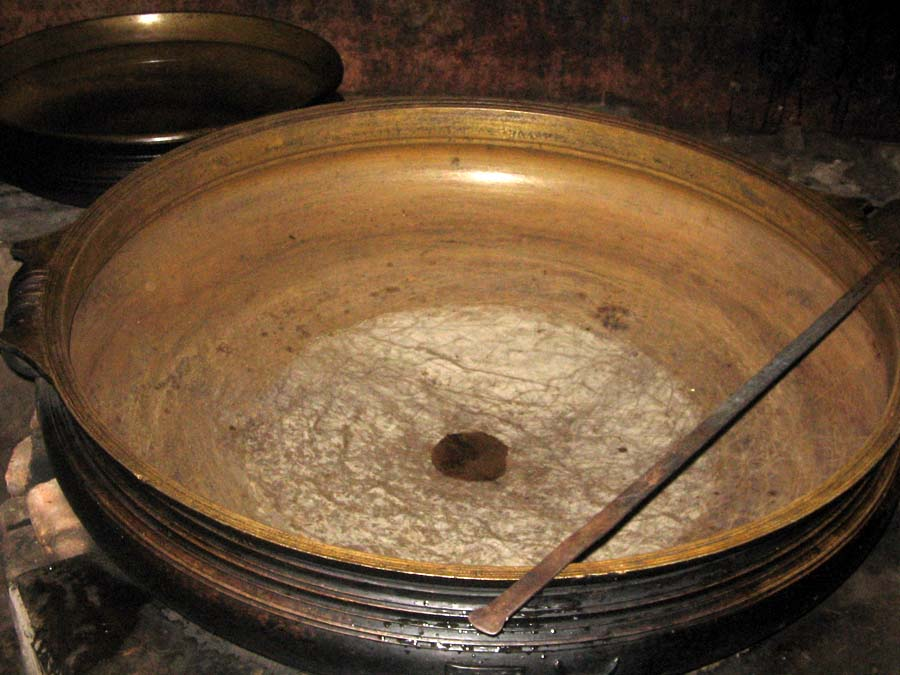
Big uruli made of bronze

Uruli is a traditional cookware used in Kerala, and more broadly in South India. It is commonly made of clay, copper, brass or bronze. Urulis were used in home for cooking and in ayurveda to make traditional medicine. A more modern use of urulis is as a decorative bowl to float flowers which is a part of South Indian tradition. It has a high capacity to retain heat, and an ability to preserve the flavour of food cooked in it.

The uruli can be found in many traditional Malayali homes, which show them in several sizes, like the small ones that have a more decorative function or also the very large “varpu'” which are used for cooking in big occasions that require a big amount of food. With its shallow circular shape this vessel is also used to display flower decor in traditional households and for the kani for the Malayalam New Year Vishu, also being used in resorts and hotels as decoration.

== Photo gallery ==
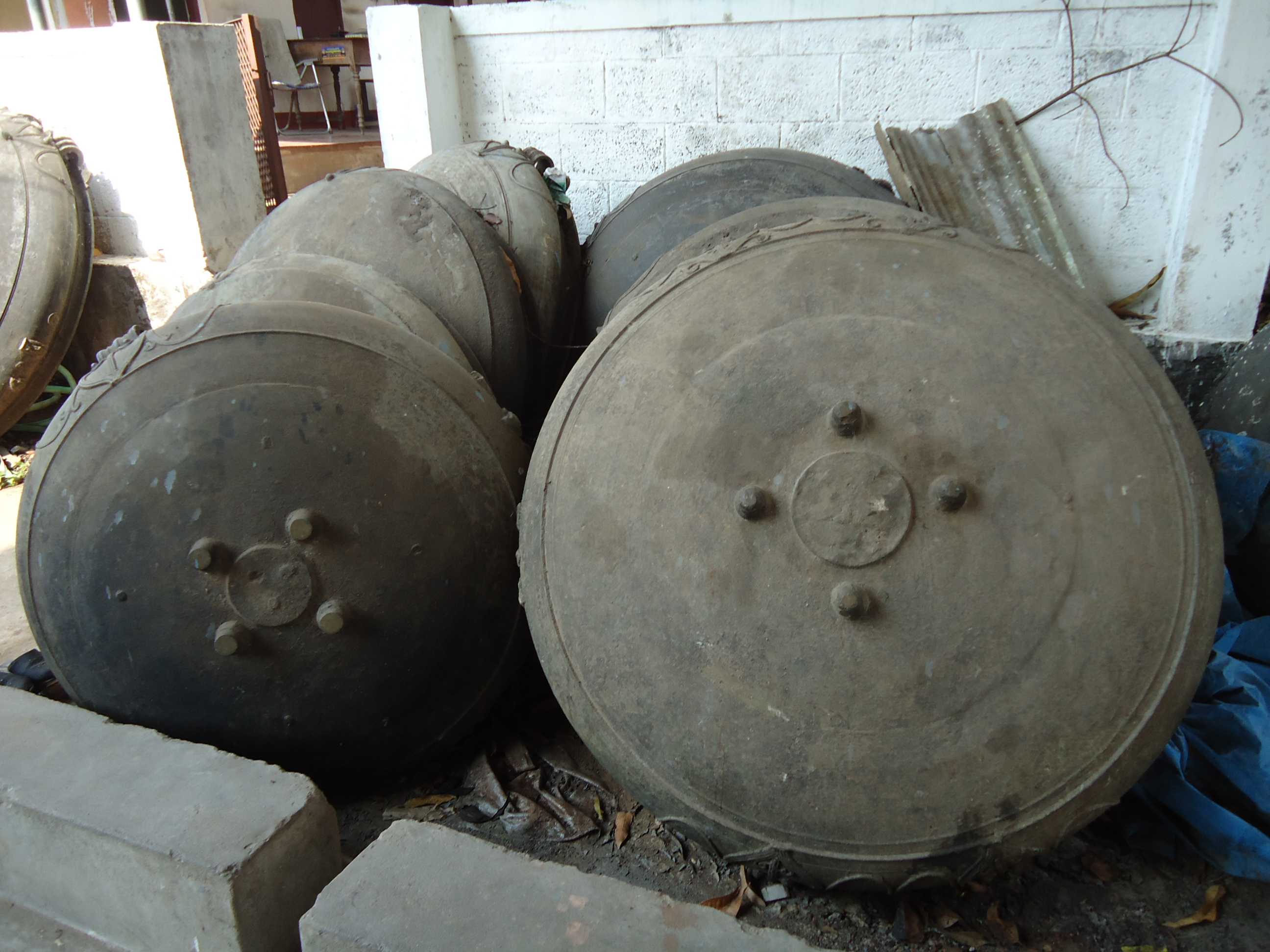

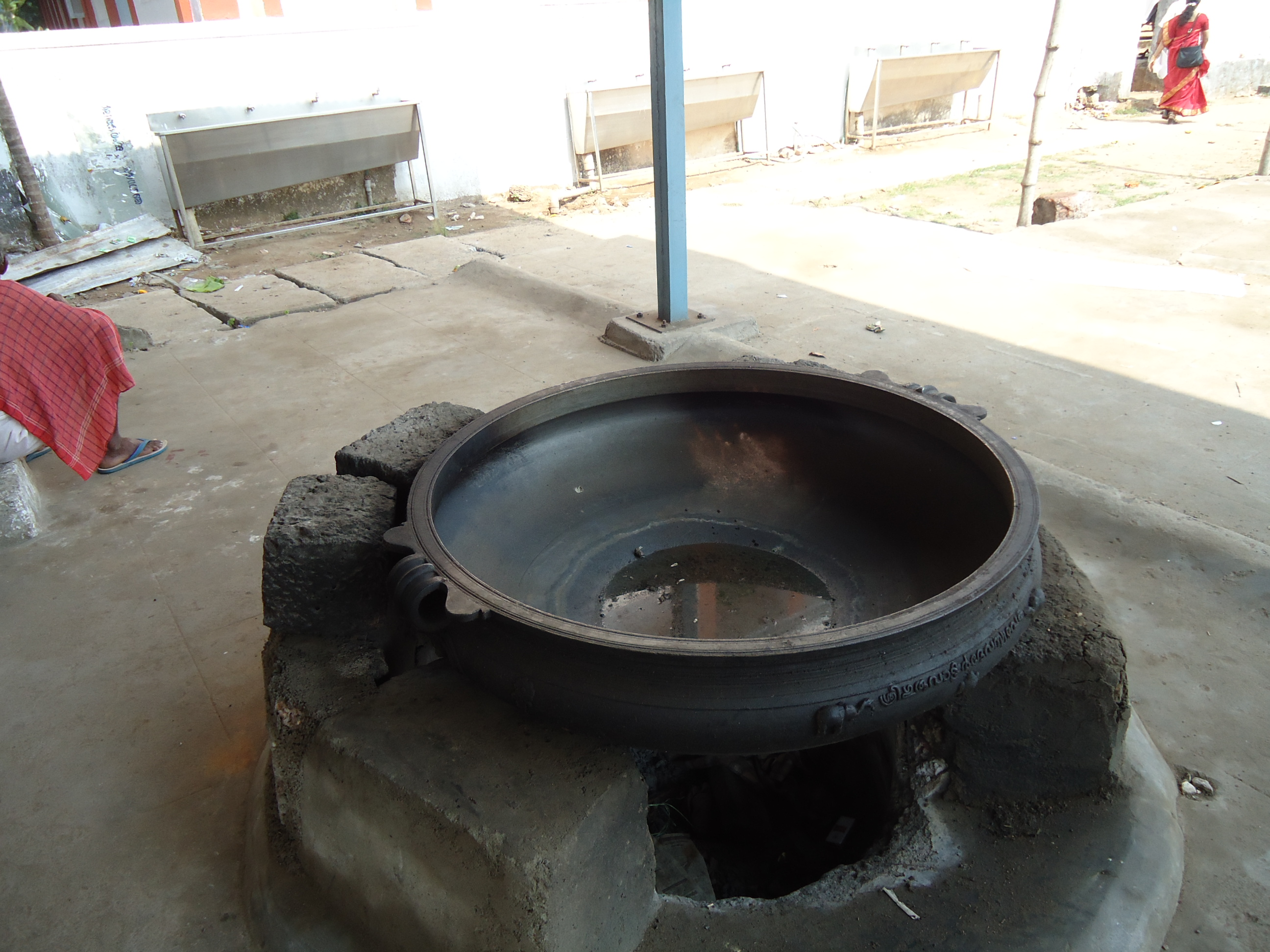

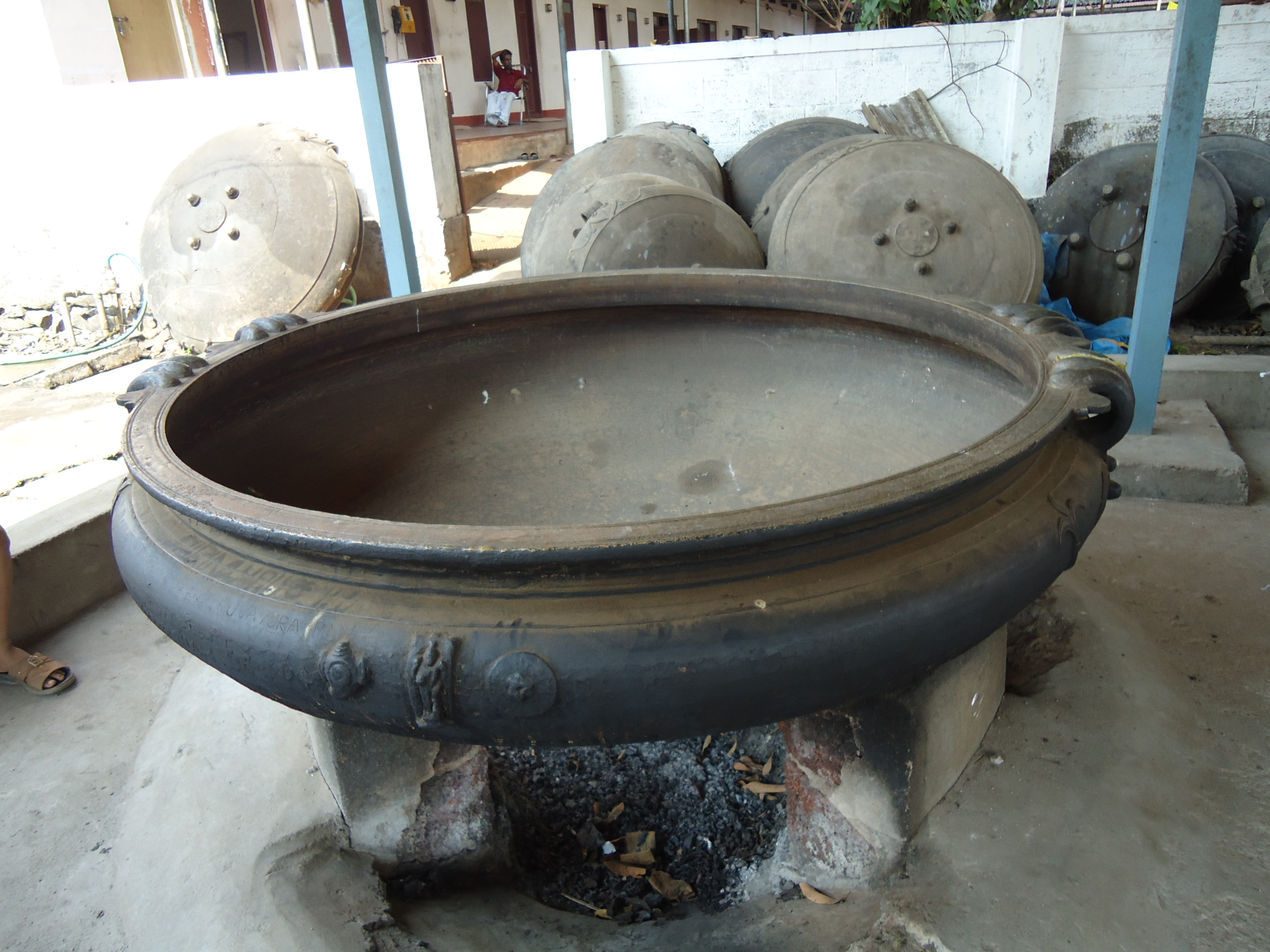

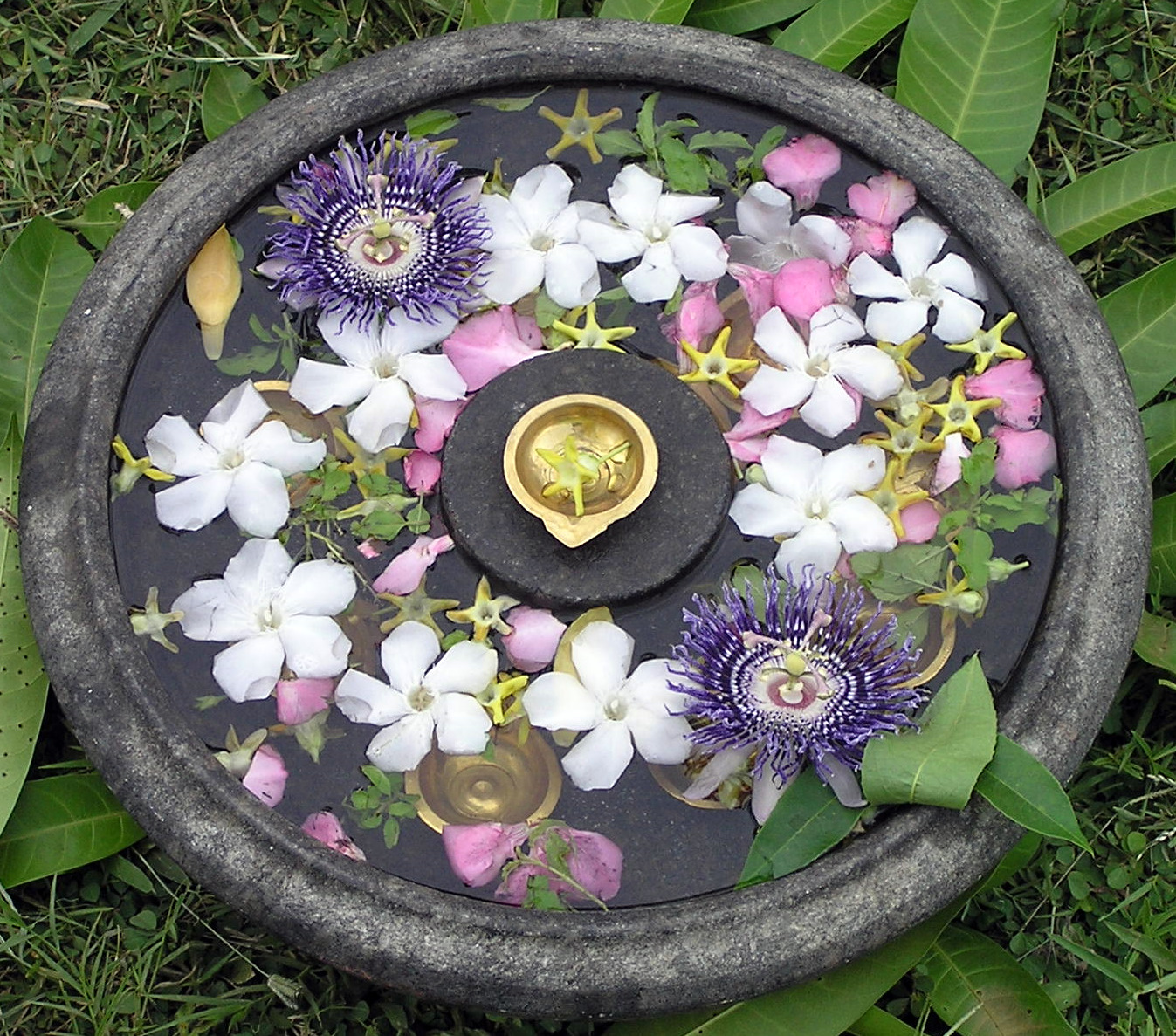

== See also ==
- Cuisine of Kerala
- Kerala
- List of cooking vessels
