= Singhpur, Rajasthan =

Singhpur
- Interactive map of Singhpur
- Coordinates: 25.04546°N 75.13474°E
- Country: India
- Division: Udaipur
- District: Chittorgarh
- Tehsil/ Taluka: Kapasan
- Elevation: 460 m (1,510 ft)

Population (2011)
  - Total: 4,696
- Time zone: UTC+5:30 (IST)
- Postal code: 312207
- Area code: 01476

Singhpur is a village in Chittogarh District of the Indian state of Rajasthan. It is located on the Chittorgarh-Udaipur highway. It have senior secondary school, girls secondary school and 3 private schools; as well as a post office, hospital, bank and police station.

It comes under Singhpur Panchayath. It belongs to Udaipur Division . It is located 20 km towards west from District headquarters Chittorgarh. 318 km from State capital Jaipur

Singhpur Pin code is 312207 and postal head office is Singhpur (Chittorgarh).
