= Singapore (South Africa) =

Settlement in South Africa

Coordinates: 24.562°S 29.315°E

Singapore is a small settlement in Waterberg District Municipality, Limpopo province, South Africa.
