= Wälti =

Wälti or Walti is a surname. Notable people with the surname include:

- Jackson Wälti (born 1999), American soccer player
- Lia Wälti (born 1993), Swiss footballer
- Martin Walti (born 1982), Swiss freestyle skier
- Rosmarie Wydler-Wälti (born 1950), Swiss environmentalist
