= Spore (1991 video game) =

- Developer(s): Mike Snyder
- Publisher(s): Flogsoli Productions
- Platform(s): MS-DOS
- Release: NA: 1991
- Genre(s): Breakout clone, text adventure
- Mode(s): Single-player

Breakout gameplay

Spore is an MS-DOS video game developed by Mike Snyder and published by Flogsoli Productions that fused Breakout with a text adventure, and included spreadsheet puzzles.

== Plot ==
The game takes place in the future about a group of intergalactic settlers who colonized a world they named Spore. The settlers and all life on Spore were mysteriously wiped out, and Earth received an S.O.S. from the planet twelve days after the disaster. The player is a lone explorer who sets out to uncover the mystery of the vanishing creatures.
