= BAIF Development Research Foundation =

Indian non-governmental organisation

- भारतीय अॅग्रो इंडस्ट्रीज फाउंडेशन
- Formation: 1967; 59 years ago
- Type: NGO
- Purpose: Rural development
- Headquarters: Pune, India
- Region served: India
- Field: Rural development
- Chairperson: Hrishikesh Mafatlal
- President and Managing Trustee: Bharat Kakade
- Website: https://baif.org.in/

The BAIF Development Research Foundation is a NGO based in Urali Kanchan near Pune in Maharashtra, India, that pioneers agricultural development. It was founded in 1967 by Manibhai Desai as the Bharatiya Agro Industries Foundation. Under Manibhai, BAIF pioneered cross breeding of high yielding European cattle such as Holstein Freisian and Jersey with the sturdy Indian breeds such as Gir from Gujarat. Later BAIF expanded the scope of activities to include animal health, nutrition, afforestation wasteland development, and tribal development.

In 1997, the organization received the Adivasi Seva Sanstha award from the State Government of Maharashtra.

== History ==
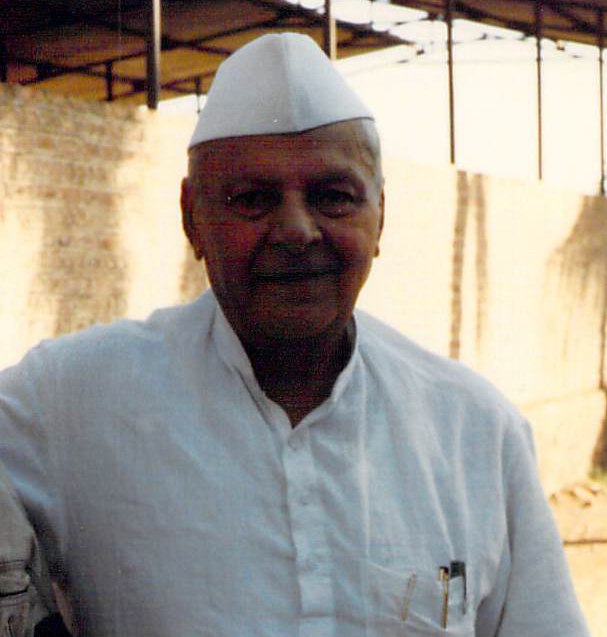
Dr. Manibhai Desai, the founder of BAIF in December 1990

Mahatma Gandhi stayed in the Urali Kanchan village near the city of Pune in 1946. At that time Gandhi had lost trust in western medicine and wanted to explore Nature therapy. For this purpose he nominated Manibhai as the manager of the newly established Nature therapy Ashram at Urali. The young Manibhai gave a pledge to Mahatma Gandhi to devote his life to uplifting of Uruli. Although Gandhian principles were central to Manibhai's work, he believed the rural poor can benefit from scientific advances During his work at the Nature cure ashram, Manibhai self-taught himself aspects of horticulture and cattle breeding. To take this work further, Bharatya Agro-Industries Foundation, was organised and registered in 1967 under the Indian Public Charitable Trust Act of 1950. The purpose of the foundation was to help rural communities to improve their socio-economic status by increasing food production along modern lines by making improvements to agriculture, horticulture, animal husbandry and other allied activities. Manibhai was appointed managing trustee and director of the foundation. Yashwantrao Chavan, then a senior cabinet minister in the Indian government and Vasantrao Naik, then chief minister of Maharashtra were chairman and deputy chairman of the organization respectively.

In early years the Foundation received aid from Western countries such as Denmark, United Kingdom, New Zealand, and Australia as well as the Indian dairy cooperation. The British charity Oxfam donated farming equipment whereas the British milk marketing board donated semen from premium sires for artificial insemination program.

In the 1980s BAIF pioneered the "WADI" agroforestry model for creating fruit orchards in tribal areas of Gujarat with limited rainfall and marginal landholding. This program was later implemented in 21 other states.

Manibhai died in 1993. BAIF named Narayan Hegde as Manibhai's successor. Hegde ran the organization until 2009 when he was succeeded by his long-time deputy Girish Sohani.

In the year 2021, Bharat Kakade who had previously served the organisation in different capacities, took charge as President and Managing Trustre of BAIF.

In September 2024, Tata Chemicals and BAIF signed a Memorandum of Understanding (MoU) to develop bio-based agricultural solutions.

== Activities ==
The developmental activities of BAIF include animal husbandry, sustainable agriculture, horticulture, water resources management, and various rural non-farm activities for generating employment for landless families and Indian tribal communities. BAIF also tried digital marketing of its agricultural products by a tie-up with an internet marketing firm but that was a failure.

=== Animal husbandry ===
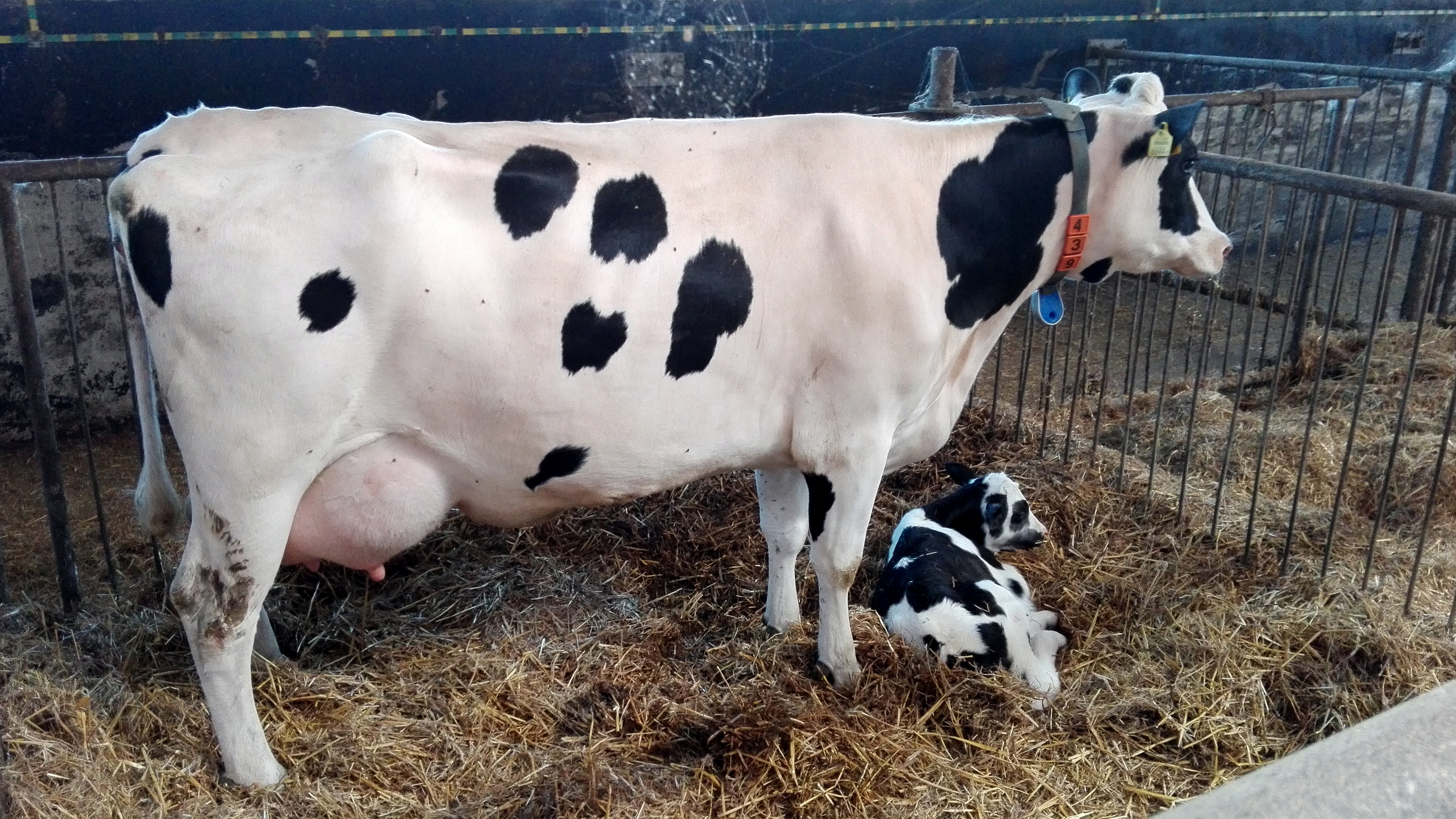
A Holstein Frisiian cow with a calf, a preferred type for crossbreeding purposes

For the last five decades starting in the late 1960s, the main thrust of BAIF activities has been animal husbandry. This has principally involved artificial insemination (AI) of indigenous Indian cattle breeds with semen from bulls of high milk yielding European cattle breeds such as Jersey and Holstein Friesian. The organization maintains its main research facilities at Uruli Kanchan with a large group of scientists, veterinarians and technical staff. Urali Kanchan also serves as the major semen production station in India. In 2015, the Urali facility produced over seven million doses of semen. Over the decades, BAIF has established AI centres in 16 Indian states such as Maharashtra, Madhya Pradesh, Karnataka etc. The organization offers door-to-door breeding services to farmers by employing and training local youth as Artificial Insemination Technicians (AIT). By 2018 the organization had helped nearly six million farmers with improved animal husbandry. The cattle improvement programme has enabled farmers to generate higher income by selling surplus milk and animals. The organization also has programs to improve the quality of water buffalo breeds to obtain better milk yields. Murrah has been the preferred indigenous breed for this program. In arid and semi-arid areas of India such as Rajasthan, BAIF has initiated programs to improve the quality of goat breeds for milk as well as for mutton. The organization also conducts surveys with farmers on best practices for cattle management.|

=== Horticulture and the Wadi program ===
In the 1980s BAIF pioneered the "WADI" agroforestry model for creating fruit orchards in tribal areas of Gujarat with limited rainfall and marginal landholding. The success of the program led to it being implemented in the neighboring state of Maharashtra followed later by introduction to 21 other states of India. This model involves establishment of multi-purpose trees around the field periphery along with fruit and/or nut trees in the field. The wide spacing of trees allows continued cultivation of annual crops. The tree planting also involves soil and water conservation measures such as trenches and bunds on the plot. BAIF and allied organizations offer support to the farmers for five years which involves free planting and construction materials, technical assistance, financial compensation for establishment and aftercare in the first three years of the fruit trees, and marketing assistance through farmer cooperatives.

=== Micro-insurance ===
BAIF introduced the idea of self-help groups (SHG) to make insurance facilities available for rural communities. An SHG usually has 109-20 members and works as a financial intermediary. BAIF operates many SHG where conventional insurance facilities are difficult to obtain.

== Sources of funding ==
From the very beginning, Manibhai relied on government support as well as support from International governments as well as NGOs to fund the activities of BAIF. This is still the main source of funding for BAIF. Organizations that have funded BAIF activities include KfW, the German German state-owned investment and development bank, the Indian National Bank for Agriculture and Rural Development or NABARD, and private charities such as the Bill & Melinda Gates Foundation. In addition, the organization also receives significant income from farmers for the cattle semen and insemination services.

== VAPCOL ==
VAPCOL(Vasundhara Agri-Horti Producer Co. Ltd.) is a for profit organisation promoted by BAIF for improving the agricultural Value chain for the farmers in taking their produce to the consumer. It was registered in 2004 as a farmer producer company (FPO)under the Indian company law. Unlike cooperatives in India, VAPCOL is able to operate across different states. VAPCOL has a membership of 55 producer organisations and a membership of 41,000 farmers. It was started by BAIF to help farmers under the Wadi scheme to be able to process and take their produce to the market. It is regarded as second tier farmer organization for procurement, grading, marketing, selling, the export of farm produce. Products marketed by VAPCOL include primary farm products such as cashew, mango, amla, flowers, milk, tomatoes and vegetables as well pickles, pulp, jam and juice. The products are sold under the brand name, Vrindavan. VAPCOL has its own independent website, Facebook page and sales through distribution network as well as online sales. The company has branches in Nasik, Vansda (Gujarat), Udaipur (Rajasthan) and Raipur (Chhattisgarh).

== Challenges and opportunities ==
Some critics of BAIF argue that the emphasis on imported breeds of cattle has been instrumental in the decimation of Indian breeds. P. Sanath in the Hindu argues that cross-breeds give higher yields, but require more feed and are not suited to Indian conditions. BAIF believes that Innovation in agrarian technology still remains under-financed, and therefore provides an opportunity to the organization to continue its research and development activities and provide services to rural communities across the country.

=== Turf encroachment ===
Even as a professionally competent NGO, BAIF has encountered resistance to its services. In one instance, when BAIF expanded its AI services with financial support from the Rajasthan Department of Rural Development, it faced opposition in some districts from the Rajsthan Department of Animal Husbandry (DoAH). To avoid duplication of services, BAIF had to leave areas where the DoAH had subsequently developed insemination facilities. There is also resistance from lower-level government employees in their perception that NGOs are eroding employment security in the government by offering cheaper contractual services.

=== A1/A2 controversy ===
After more than fifty years of crossbreeding programme all over India, drawbacks of crossbreeding with European breeds such as susceptibility to diseases, high rate of infertility, poor tolerance to heat, high feeding cost, etc. were pointed out by critics in the last decade. In response BAIF started to offer AI with quality native breeds in interior villages with poor access to veterinary services. The unverified claims of A1 milk causing multiple health issues also affected consumer acceptance of milk from crossbred cows. These reports have led to many political and religious groups taking up intensive campaign for prevention of crossbreeding in cattle. The campaign has led BAIF to assess the implication of these campaigns on milk production and income of dairy farmers if raising of high yielding crossbred cows is discouraged. This was compounded by the Indian government's launch of the Rashtriya Gokul Mission scheme in 2014.One of the aim of the scheme was to improve the genetics of local cattle using indigenous breeds, while preventing crossbreeding to discourage the production of A1 type milk. BAIF scientists have countered the claims by showing that only pure-bred Holstein Friesian cows from United States produce A1 milk whereas water buffalo, Jersey cows, and the crossbred ones produce A2 milk.
