= Waghapur =

- Census town
- Location in Maharashtra, India
- Coordinates: 20.411°N 78.1133°E
- Country: India
- State: Maharashtra
- District: Yavatmal

Population (2001)
  - Total: 8,405

Languages
  - Official: Marathi
- Time zone: UTC+5:30 (IST)

Waghapur is a census town in Yavatmal district in the Indian state of Maharashtra.

== Demographics ==
As of 2001 India census, Waghapur had a population of 8405. Males constitute 54% of the population and females 46%. Waghapur has an average literacy rate of 69%, higher than the national average of 59.5%: male literacy is 63%, and female literacy is 76%. In Waghapur, 10% of the population is under 6 years of age.

Year	Male	Female	Total Population	Change	Religion (%)							
Year	Male	Female	Total Population	Change	Hindu	Muslim	Christian	Sikhs	Buddhist	Jain	Other religions and persuasions	Religion not stated
2001	4443	3864	8307	-	74.227	0.758	0.614	0.060	22.716	1.083	0.542	0.000
2011	6510	6174	12684	0.527	72.154	0.307	0.710	0.032	24.661	1.443	0.000	0.694
