= Vimala Thakar =

Indian social activist and spiritual teacher (1921–2009)

Vimala Thakar (born 15 April 1921 Ramnavmi day at Bilaspur and died on 11 March 2009 at Falgun Poornima at Mt. Abu) was an Indian social activist and spiritual teacher. Born into a middle-class family living at Akola city in Maharashtra state in India, she was interested in spiritual matters from an early age. She pursued this interest with meditation and spiritual practices throughout her youth. She post graduated in Eastern and Western philosophy, Dr. Sarvapalli Radhakrishnan was one of her professors.

Later she became active in the Bhoodan (Land Gift) Program. This program, led by Vinoba Bhave, persuaded landlords to give land to poor farmers. Through the 1950s, several million acres of farmland were so redistributed. She travelled India to its length and breadth.

In 1958, Thakar attended talks given by, and met with, the philosopher Jiddu Krishnamurti. This meeting was to change her life. She left the Land-Gift movement to dedicate herself to what she called "the internal problem"—the spiritual liberation of the individual. She dedicated herself to teaching meditation and philosophy, traveling between India, the U.S. and Europe. In 1979, she rekindled her passion for social activism, traveling through India and founding centers to educate villagers in agro-centered industries, sanitation, local self-government, and active democratic citizenship. Her teachings came to emphasize balancing 'inner' spiritual development with 'outer' social development, an evolution reflected in her 1984 book "Spirituality and Social Action: A Holistic Approach." After 1991, she curtailed her travel outside India.

She died on 11 March 2009, on the day of Holi, the festival of colour in India. She was living at Mount Abu, Rajasthan, India during her last years.

== Philosophical views ==
Vimala Thakar’s philosophy was influenced by the spiritual teachings of Jiddu Krishnamurti and the nonviolent social change philosophy of Mahatma Gandhi and Vinoba Bhave. She sought to reconcile the often separated worlds of spirituality and social action, arguing that in fact each is indispensable to the other: “In this era, to become a spiritual inquirer without social consciousness is a luxury that we can ill afford, and to be a social activist without a scientific understanding of the inner workings of the mind is the worst folly. Neither approach in isolation has had any significant success. There is no question now that an inquirer will have to make an effort to be socially conscious or that an activist will have to be persuaded of the moral crisis in the human psyche, the significance of being attentive to the inner life. The challenge awaiting us is to go much deeper as human beings, to abandon superficial prejudices and preferences, to expand understanding to a global scale, integrating the totality of living, and to become aware of the wholeness of which we are a manifestation.”

She has also pointed out that intense self-education and transformation are naturally, in themselves, valid and very significant forms of social action. She recognized that some of us have a more inward, meditative orientation. She addressed these issues in depth at times, including with the book Vimalaji on Intensive Self-Education.

== Publications ==
1. Glimpses of Raja Yoga: An Introduction to Patanjali's Yoga Sutras (Yoga Wisdom Classics), (Rodmell Press, 2005)
2. Insights into the Bhagavad Gita (New Delhi: Motilal Banarsidass, 2005)
3. Why Meditation? Five Talks Delivered at the Blaisdell Institute Claremont University, California, 1974 (New Delhi: Motilal Banarsidass, 2005)
4. Blossoms of Friendship (Rodmell Press, 2003; New Delhi: Motilal Banarsidass Publishers, 2004)
5. Totality in Essence Talks in Ceylon, 1971 (2002), with Sogyal Rinpoche, Mind Our Greatest Gift (Mananam Series) (1995)
6. Vimalaji and Her Perspective of Life (Vimal Prakashahan Trust, 1998)
7. From Intellect to Intelligence (Holland: Vimala Thakar Foundation, 1976)
8. On an Eternal Voyage, (Bombay: R. Raman, at Inland Printers, 2nd ed., 1972)
9. Voyage Into Oneself (Holland: Vimala Thakar Foundation, 1970)
1. The books by Vimala Thakar in Gujarati, Hindi, English and Marathi languages are available at, Vimal Prakashan Trust-"Vimal Saurabh", vaniawadi St no-9, Rajkot-360002, Gujarat India. Contact No: +91 99255 29096, +91 9825416769
2. "The Eloquence of Living" (Berkeley, CA 94701: Vimala Programs. 1981)233 pgs.
