= Leopolis, Missouri =

Extinct human settlement

Coordinates: 39.871963°N 93.421323°W

Leopolis is an extinct town in Livingston County, in the U.S. state of Missouri.

Leopolis was settled by a colony of Catholics, and most likely was named after a seminary of the same name near the original town site. A post office called Leopolis was established in 1892, and remained in operation until 1901.
