= Singapur, Mancherial district =

Singapur
- Census Town
- Location in Telangana, India Singapur (India)
- Coordinates: 18.86391°N 79.49183°E
- Country: India
- State: Telangana
- District: Mancherial
  - Rank: 11.42
- Elevation: 576 m (1,890 ft)

Population (2011)
  - Total: 20,061

Languages
  - Official: Telugu
- Time zone: UTC+5:30 (IST)

Singapur is a census town in Mancherial district in the Indian state of Telangana.

== Geography ==
Singapur is located at 18.86391°N 79.49183°E.

== Demographics ==
As of 2001 India census, Singapur had a population of 23,458. Males constitute 51% of the population and females 49%. Singapur has an average literacy rate of 55%, lower than the national average of 59.5%: male literacy is 62%, and female literacy is 48%. In Singapur, 11% of the population is under 6 years of age.
