= Sincapore (ship) =

Several vessels in the 19th century were named Sincapore, a contemporary variant of the name Singapore:

- Sincapore, was a brig that wrecked at Algoa Bay in 1823. Lloyd's List reported a letter from the Cape of Good Hope dated 2 April 1823. The brig Singapore, of Bengal, had arrived the day before. HMS Leven had found her near Delagoa Bay in the hands of the Portuguese government. Only one of her crew was still alive; the master and all the rest had died of disease. The government had landed her cargo. Captain Owen prevailed on the government to reload the cargo. He then put a crew on board Singapore and sent her into the Cape. There was another vessel at Delagoa Bay, the schooner Orange Grove, which too had lost all but her master and supercargo, and whose cargo too the government had landed. Orange Grove sailed to the Cape in company with Singapore. Captain Owen, in his account of his explorations, refers to Singapore throughout as Sincapore.
- Sincapore (1826 ship) was launched in New Brunswick and wrecked at Table Bay in 1830.
- Sincapore was a steam-ship operating in Asian waters in 1854.
