= Uruli Kanchan =

Village in Maharashtra

- village
- Location in Maharashtra, India Uruli Kanchan (India)
- Coordinates: 18°28′N 74°07′E
- Country: India
- State: Maharashtra
- District: Pune

Government
  - Type: Gram Panchayat

Languages
  - Official: Marathi
- Time zone: UTC+5:30 (IST)
- PIN: 412202
- Telephone code: 02026926230/98
- Nearest city: Pune

Uruli Kanchan is a village 33 km east from the city of Pune in the district of Pune, Maharashtra, India. The village has been famous for the last sixty years for the Naturopathy Center (Nisarg Upchar Ashram) started by Mahatma Gandhi and his disciple Manibhai Desai. The village is also the location of the BAIF Development Research Foundation, an NGO started by Manibhai Desai in the 1960s. BAIF is well known throughout India for its program of breeding high yielding livestock and promoting sustainable rural development.

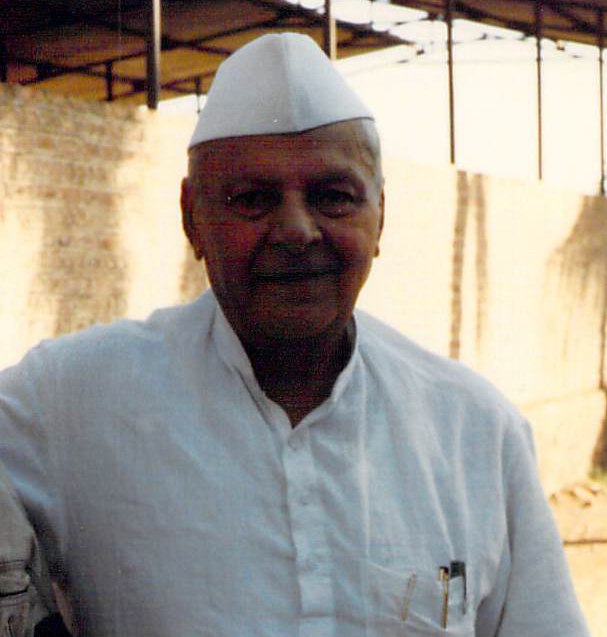
Dr. Manibhai Desai in December 1990

== History ==
Uruli was first mentioned in a copper plate issued by Shilahara king Aparajita in 993 AD. The plate refers to Pune region as Punaka vishaya and included Theur, Uruli, Chorachi Alandi, Bhosari etc. According to Sankhelia, Uruli was called Araluva in these plates but he calls the inscription to be from the Rashtrakuta era rather than the later Shilahara.

Under British colonial rule, Great Indian Peninsula Railway started train services between Mumbai and Solapur in December 1858 with Uruli Kanchan as one of the Stations on the route. The Train Station at that time served as a transit point for pilgrims traveling to Jejuri from Uruli using a dirt road. The train was also used for transporting Pomegranate to the markets of Poona and Bombay. The annual Sant Tukaram Maharaj Palkhi procession has been taking a halt for lunch in Uruli en route to Pandharpur in the Hindu Shaka month of Jeshtha for centuries.

The British colonial government set up a relief camp for people affected by the great famine of 1897 in Uruli. The work mainly involved cutting stone from a local quarry. A Grampanchayat or Village Council was established in 1936 with Mr, Pranlal Shah as the first Sarpanch or leader of the council.

Mahatma Gandhi came to Uruli Kanchan on 22 March 1946, & stayed here for 7 days with his young disciple, Manibhai Desai. Manibhai, as has been mentioned before, was instrumental in totally transforming the village over many decades. His first major activity here was to open a Nature cure Ashram which continues to this day and is well known throughout India. This was followed by opening of Schools in Uruli. In 1967, he founded the Bharatiya Agro-Industries Foundation (BAIF). BAIF has been a pioneer in introducing the Indo-European hybrid cattle breed to India.

== Geography ==
Uruli Kanchan lies 33 km east of the City of Pune. A few kilometers north of the village flows the Mula-Mutha River. A few kilometers south of the village is the Sinhagad - Bhuleshwar mountain range. A road going South connects Uruli with the pilgrim Center of Jejuri on the other side of the mountain range. The area around Uruli receives on average 600 mm of rain per annum. The medium black soil around Uruli is very fertile and irrigation from the mutha canal allows for growing of cash crops.

== Demographics ==
According to the census of India of 2011, the population of the village was 30,305 with 15,687 males and 14,618 females. The number of households in the village was 6,693. The village is dominated by a number of Maratha clans on political and economic level. The village also has a significant population of Marwadi and Sindhi people. Both communities dominate trade in the village. The Sindhi families settled into Uruli when they migrated to India from Sindh after Indian independence in 1947. Due to the excellent transport links to Pune, the village also has a sizeable population that commutes to work in Pune Metropolitan Region. The presence of the school, college and BAIF means there is a high proportion of professionals such as teachers, veterinary doctors, and agricultural scientists residing in the area.

With constant expansion of the Pune Metropolitan Area and the consequent demand for more housing, Uruli Kanchan and surrounding villages are slowly turning into outer suburbs of Pune. A number of Gated communities of High end Apartment blocks are getting built.

== Economy ==
The area around Uruli is irrigated by the Mutha canal and therefore the land is used for growing cash crops like sugarcane and grapes. The sugarcane is supplied mainly to the sugar mill at Anurag Sugar Factory near Yawat, a 15 km from Uruli. The village holds a weekly open air market on Sunday. The Naturopathy Ashram attracts wealthy patrons from all over India. The cattle breeding program at BAIF attracts professionals from all across India.

In recent years, the village has attracted a number of Household furniture and windows manufacturers, and distributors.

== Local Government ==
A Grampanchayat or Village Council was established in 1936 with Mr, Pranlal Shah as the first Sarpanch or leader of the council. Later Manibhai Desai served as the Sarpanch for a long period. The council has six wards (Constituencies) that elect a total of 17 members.

== Transport ==
Urali railway station is served by Central Railway's the main Mumbai - Secunderabad line and the Pune -Solapur National highway. There are also Local PMPML bus services 7 / 7A and 9 that go to and from Pune and Hadapsar respectively.

== Educational facilities ==
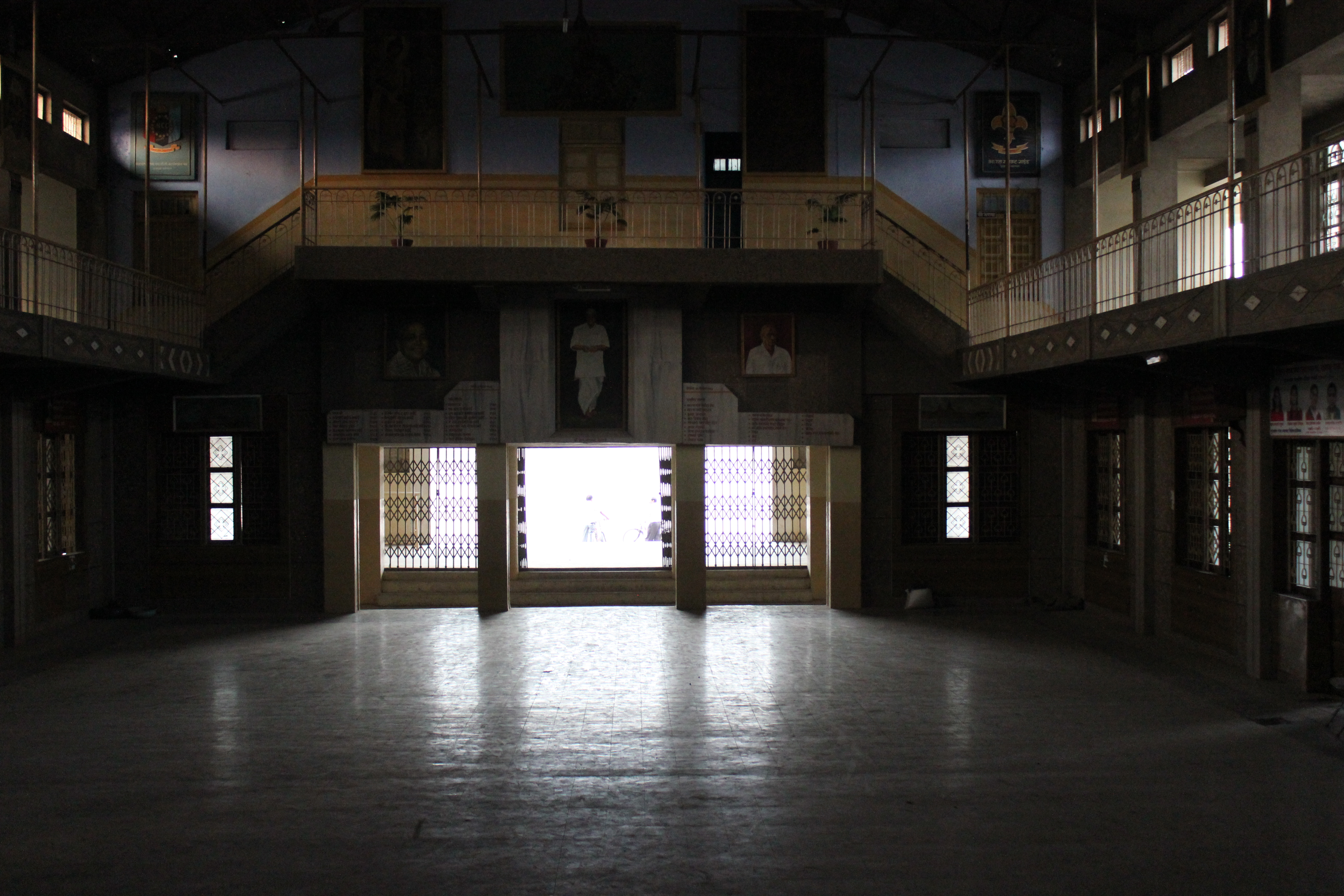
Mahatma Gandhi Vidyalaya School Hall

The oldest school in the village is a Primary School (Elementary School) which was established in 1881. The school is run by the Pune District Council (Zilla Parishad). The medium of instruction is Marathi. The school occupied the same building as the village Panchayat or the council but recently moved into a new building.

The local high school, Mahatma Gandhi Vidyalaya is recognized as a rural center of excellence. The medium of instruction in this school is Marathi. The school is co-educational and has around 3000 students. The school has offered a choice of vocational courses for high school grade students (year 8-10) in Technology and Agriculture for decades. The school also runs a hostel called Kumar Chhatralaya for around 200 male students from outside the area. There are also schools in the area where the medium of instruction is English. These include Amar Education Institute, Angel High School & Dr. Cyrus Poonawala English Medium School.

The High School shares it campus with Padmashri Manibhai Desai Mahavidyalaya or College. The College is affiliated to Pune University and offers Bachelor level courses in Arts, Commerce and Sciences.
